= Andrew Jackson and the slave trade =

1828 U.S. campaign issue

Andrew Jackson was an American slave trader and freebooter who became the seventh president of the United States. Jackson (lifespan, 1767–1845; U.S. presidency, 1829–1837) bought and sold slaves from 1788 until 1844, both for use as a plantation labor force and for short-term financial gain through slave arbitrage. Jackson was most active in the interregional slave trade, which he termed "the mercantile transactions", from the 1790s through the 1810s. Available evidence shows that speculator Jackson trafficked people between his hometown of Nashville, Tennessee, and the slave markets of the lower Mississippi River valley. Unlike the Virginia-born Founding Father planter-presidents, Jackson inherited no slaves or lands from his parents.

Jackson bought and sold outright, but slaves also served as barter for trade goods, currency for real estate transactions, and as the stakes in bets on horse races. "Cash or negroes" were the preferred payment methods of the frontier U.S. south. While Jackson had a number of business interests in Tennessee, many of Jackson's slave sales took place in the Natchez District in what is now the state of Mississippi, the Feliciana District in what is now the state of Louisiana, and in New Orleans. Jackson ran a trading stand and saloon in the vicinity of Bruinsburg, Mississippi (not far from Port Gibson), and/or at Old Greenville, two now-extinct settlements at the southern end of an Indigenous trade route known to history as the Natchez Trace. Jackson's customers included his wife's sister's extended family and their neighbors, Anglo-American settlers who owned tobacco farms and cotton plantations worked by slave labor. Jackson seems to have traded in partnership with his Donelson brothers-in-law and nephews. After 1800, Jackson often tasked his nephew-by-marriage John Hutchings with escorting their shipments to the lower country. In 1812, while arguing over a coffle that he himself had shopped around Natchez, Andrew Jackson admitted in writing that he was an experienced slave trader, stating that his cost for "Negroes sent to markett [sic]...never averaged more from here than fifteen dollars a head."

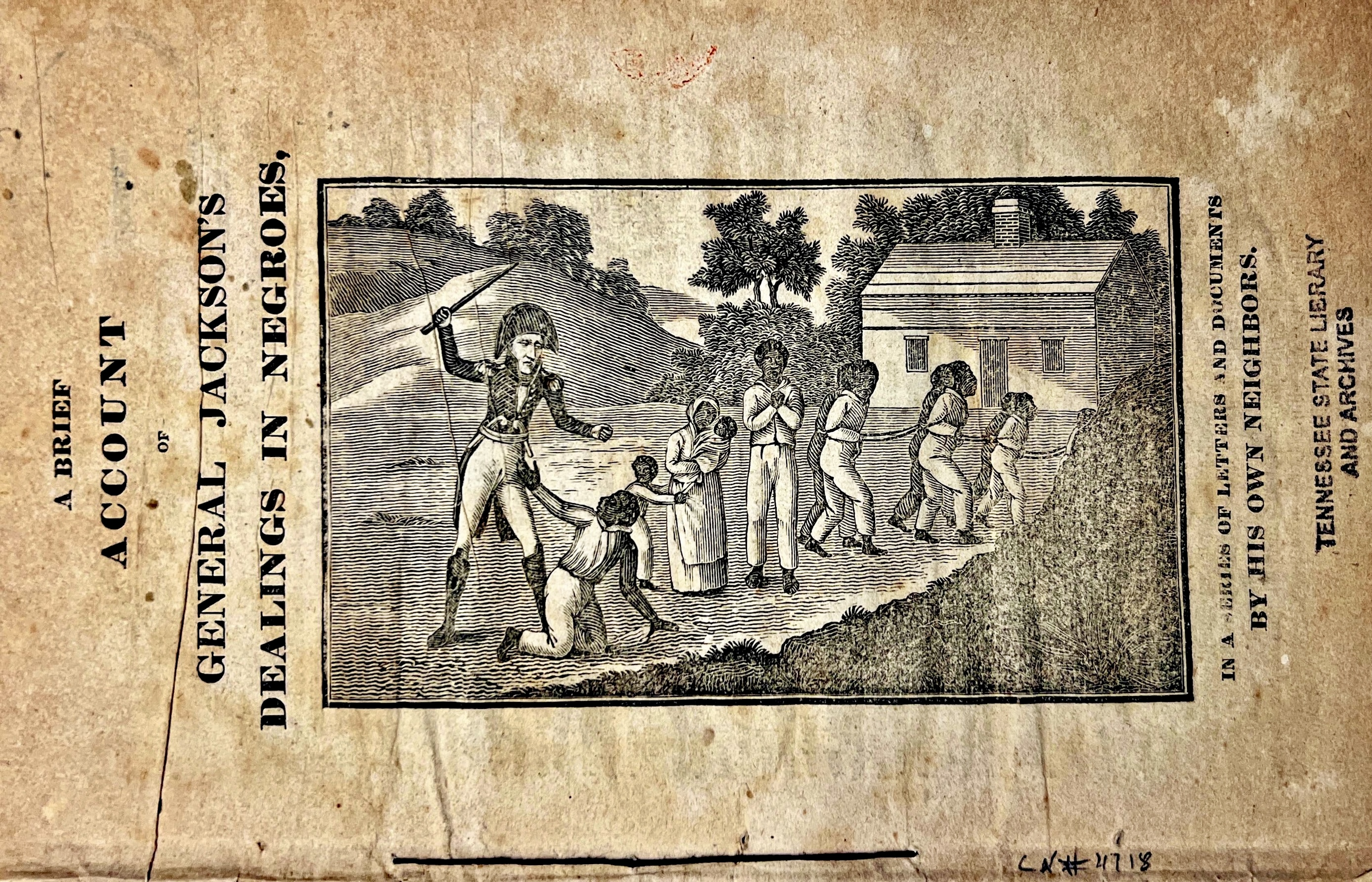
Negative campaigning in the 1828 United States presidential election: A Brief account of General Jackson's dealing in Negroes, in a series of letters and documents by his own neighbors, an appeal to the citizens of the State of New York to continue the wise administration of John Quincy Adams, containing letters by Wilkins Tannehill, Boyd McNairy, and Andrew Erwin (Tennessee State Library and Archives)

Jackson's slave trading was a major issue during the 1828 United States presidential election. Some of Jackson's accusers during the 1828 campaign had known him for decades and were themselves affiliated with the trade. His candidacy was also opposed by a number of Natchez elites who provided affidavits or copies of Jackson's slave-sale receipts to local newspapers. Jackson and his supporters denied that he was a slave trader, and the issue failed to connect with the electorate. Little is known about the people Jackson sold south. However, because of the partisan hostility of the 1828 campaign, there are surviving records naming eight individuals carried to Mississippi: Candis, age 20, and Malinda, age 14, sold at the same time to the same buyer for $1,000 for the pair; Fanny, sold for $280; a 35-year-old woman named Betty and her 15-year-old daughter Hannah, sold together for $550; and a young mother named Kessiah, and her two children, a three-year-old named Ruben and an infant named Elsey, sold as a family for $650.

Jackson was identified as a slave trader in his own lifetime by abolitionist writers including Benjamin F. Lundy and Theodore Dwight Weld. There are a number of secondhand accounts attesting to Jackson's business dealings in Mississippi and Louisiana. There is substantial evidence of slaving to be found in Jackson's surviving letters; historian Frederic Bancroft examined Jackson's correspondence in Slave-Trading in the Old South (1931).

== Historical background ==
Jackson, a native of the Carolinas and pioneer settler of Tennessee in 1788, was connected to colonial-era Mississippi by the geography of commerce. Moving goods between the east coast and the Cumberland River basin was challenging because of the necessary, difficult, and expensive passage through the Appalachian Mountains. Moving goods north to market in Kentucky or the Illinois Country was pointless because those places produced more or less the same products as Tennessee. That left the western inland waterways as the road to market, and in much of what became the territory of the United States in North America, these waters lead to the mouth of the Mississippi River at the Gulf of Mexico and from there to the rest of the Atlantic world.

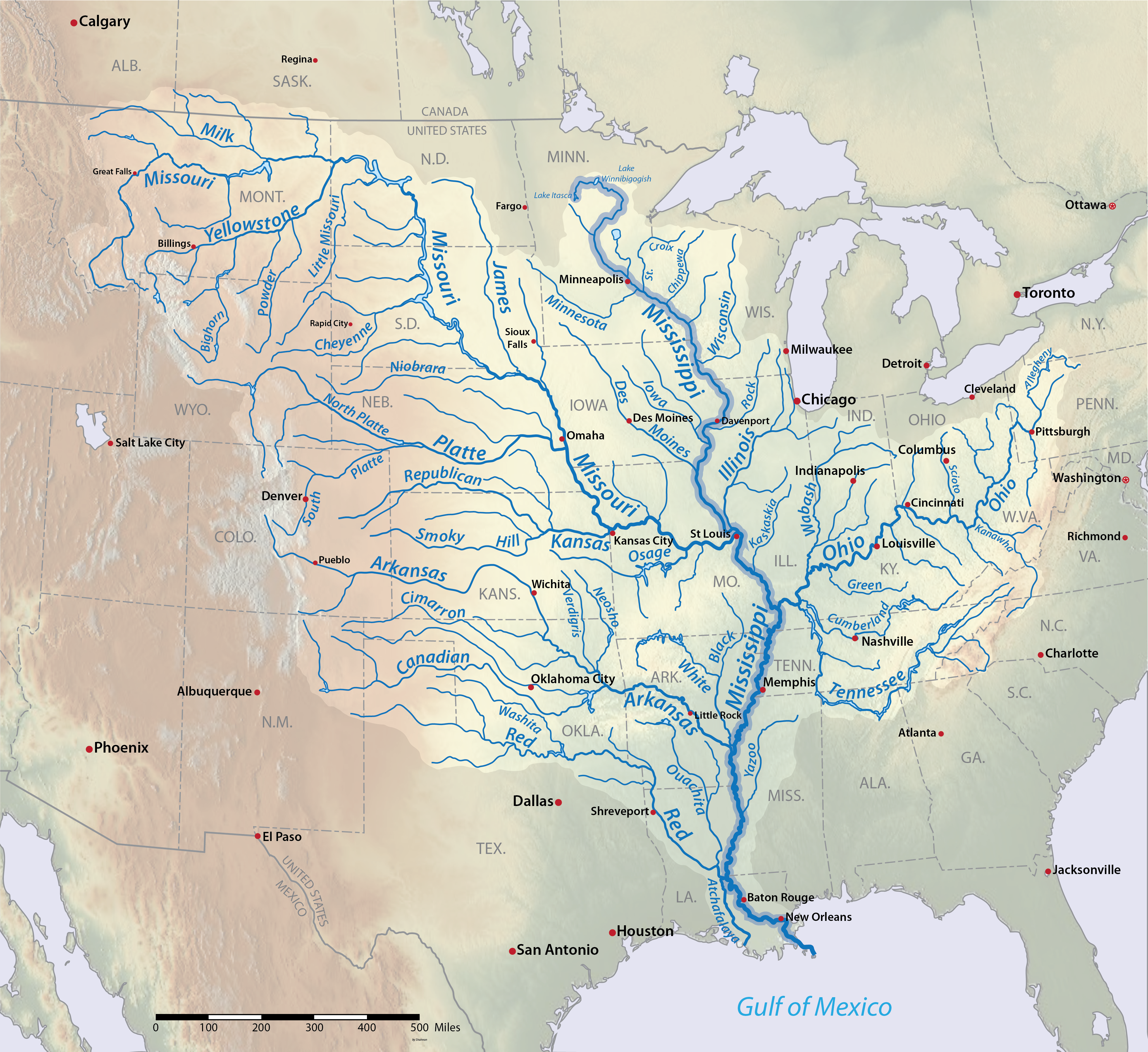
Andrew Jackson's flatboats steered from Stones River to the Cumberland River to the Ohio River to the Mississippi River, and thence to Natchez.

Before colonization and settlement, the land that came to be known as the Natchez District was the domain of Indigenous communities including the Houmas, the Koroas, the Natchez (Na·šceh), and the Tunicas. Other tribes with scattered settlements in the lower Mississippi included the Atakapa (Ishakkoy), Biloxi (Tanêksa), Caddo (Hasí꞉nay), Chitimacha, Opelousa, and Quapaw (Ogáxpa). Following the bloody Natchez revolt of 1729, counterrevolutionary violence by French colonial militias all but destroyed the region's namesake Natchez people. Most of the Natchez were killed, some were sold into slavery on Saint-Domingue, a few survivors escaped and were assimilated into Creek (Muscogee, Mvskoke) or Cherokee (Tsalagi, ᏣᎳᎩ) communities. In 1765, the Choctaw (Chahta) signed the old Natchez domain over to the British Empire, and as part of West Florida the Natchez District attracted a handful of families fleeing the Thirteen Colonies during the American Revolutionary War. (Note: These settlers have typically been deemed Loyalists but recent scholarship suggests most had more apolitical motives for the move: a desire to bypass the violence and cultural disruption that accompanied the war, and a "formulaic attempt to expedite the process of acquiring land" by pledging loyalty to the British.) In 1785, a visitor estimated the population of the Natchez District at 2,000, with approximately 900 slaves laboring for 1,100 colonists. Spain took control and opened Spanish West Florida to American colonists on August 23, 1787. The population of colonial-era Natchez was clustered along the waterways, namely the Big Black River, Bayou Pierre, Cole's Creek, Fairchild's Creek, St. Catherine's Creek, and the Homochitto River (with its right-bank tributaries Second Creek and Sandy Creek). These streams and rivers also served as the region's commercial thoroughfares; travelers and migrant trains surely cut through the pine woods and tramped over the hummocks of the cypress swamps, but the land routes were comparatively inferior passages for traders moving goods in bulk. Just about everything else between the Mississippi River and Georgia was titled to the Cherokee, Chickasaw (Chikashsha), Choctaw, and Creek people native to the region. By the last decade of the 18th century, the Natchez region had a polyglot, pluralistic, creolized culture. The region's economy was also rapidly changing, as tobacco, indigo, timber, and cattle were being supplanted by industrial-scale cotton agriculture. There are no known sources that historians can use to study the importation of slaves to Mississippi prior to the 1810s, but it is clear that the end of the Spanish tobacco subsidy and the simultaneous removal of trade barriers spurred an increase in the slave trade. Traders and slave owners moved an estimated 18,000 enslaved people over land, river, and sea into lower Louisiana between 1790 and 1810.

Victor Collot's 1796 map, with an inset illustration of Natchez and Natchez-Under-the-Hill, showing Natchez Trace landmarks including the Grand Village of the Chickasaw, said to be surrounded by old peach and apple orchards, on the way to Colbert's ferry at the Chickasaw Shoals of the Tennessee River (Cartes des sources de la Mobile et de la rivière du Yasou, comprenant une partie du cours du fleuve du Mississipi depuis la rivière à Margot jusqu'aux Natchez, Bibliothèque nationale de France IFN-53216165)

The primacy of cotton meant that "slavery became very much a central institution and defining feature" of the region. Around 1792, settlers were predominantly Anglo-American and two out of every three slaves in the Natchez District were African-born. Some African-born slaves destined for the United States were first carried to the West Indies, in particular to the British colony of Jamaica, whose planters preferred to buy Igbo people from "the Gold Coast and the Bight of Benin". The Mississippi Territory of the United States was organized in 1798. When the Natchez District transitioned from Spanish to American suzerainty and from "a frontier to a borderland, and eventually to a bordered land...slaves were the losing party in the transfer of power." Although the territorial organizing act prohibited the introduction to Mississippi of slaves from outside the U.S., this "foreign trade ban seems to have been ignored." The importation of these so-called saltwater slaves to American ports continued until 1808, when the law prohibiting transatlantic slave shipments went into effect, although slavers, euphemistically termed privateers, continued to deliver to trading centers just beyond the U.S. border, including Galveston (just down the Gulf coast from the port of New Orleans), and Amelia Island (nearly the southernmost of the Sea Islands, and just south of the Georgia border in what was then Spanish East Florida).

Available evidence shows that Jackson participated in what is called the internal slave trade, buying and selling enslaved Americans born and raised in the first 16 U.S. states. These were termed country-born negroes (as opposed to enslaved Louisiana Creole people, enslaved Saint-Domingue Creoles, Guinea negroes from the so-called Slave Coast of West Africa, or Congo-born slaves from central Africa, perhaps bearing what were called "country marks" resulting from ritual scarification). Jackson seemingly moved people from the eastern seaboard and the upland south to what is now called the Deep South, where more demand made for higher prices. Trafficking American-born slaves across the continent to colonial Natchez and New Orleans would have been somewhat unusual and enterprising; it was not until after 1815 that American slave traders regularly shipped African-American slaves from the Atlantic states to the lower south.

It is not quite 1,000 mi (1,600 km) as the crow flies from Pittsburgh, at the head of the Ohio, to Natchez on the eastern bank of the Mississippi, and Nashville stands at just about the midpoint on the route between the states that ratified the U.S. Constitution, and the outlet of a continent-spanning river system. Nashville was never a first-tier slave market, but as late as 1860 the city served as a sort of fulcrum for the domestic trade.

== Slave trading, 1789–1799 ==
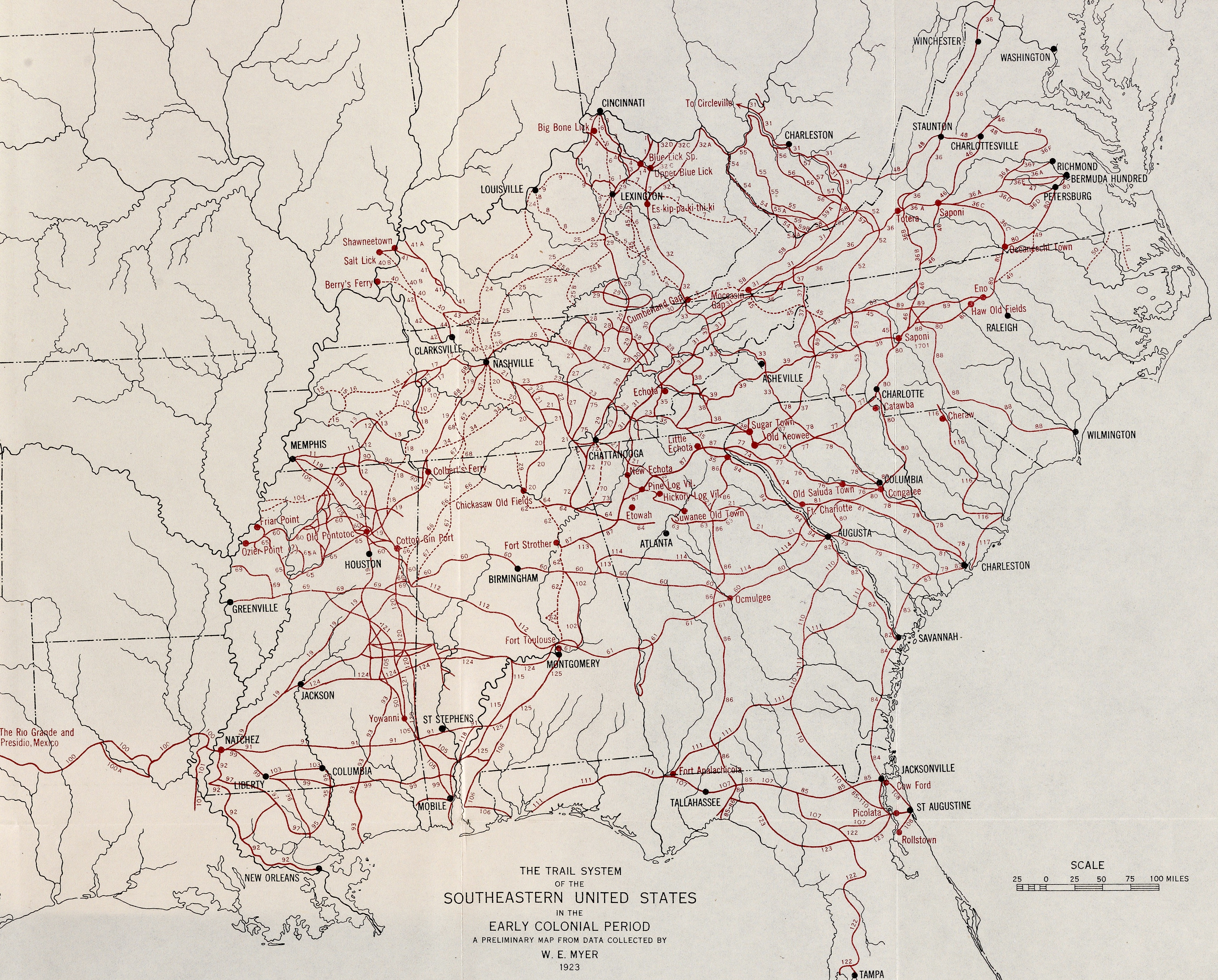
"Indian Trails of the Southeast" showing the Saluda Mountain Road section of the ancient Catawba Trail that connected the Carolinas to East Tennessee, and the Natchez Trace through Tennessee, the northwest corner of Alabama, and Mississippi (William Edward Myer, 1928, plate 15 in 42d Annual Report of the Bureau of American Ethnology via Beinecke Rare Book and Manuscript Library)

In 1781, at age 14, Andrew Jackson found himself unattached, his immigrant parents and two older brothers all having died of disease or misadventure over the course of his childhood. As such, he was already on his own when he inherited a modest sum that he then spent down in Charleston, "leaving himself nearly destitute" although "a throw of the dice in a game called rattle and snap" netted him some more money and "saved his horse from having a new owner." He moved to North Carolina where he studied law, and then, in company with work friends, he moved west to examine the prospects for a frontier lawyer in the new settlement that was being hacked out of the woodlands along the Cumberland River in the Mero District of North Carolina, shortly to become the Territory South of the River Ohio.

In the summer of 1789, Jackson rode the waters of the Mississippi south to Bruinsburg, which was located at the confluence of the Mississippi and Bayou Pierre. The name Bayou Pierre dates to the French period, but the local pronunciation of bayou "ignores the y and rhymes the word with now." In 1789 there were no riverfront settlements between L'Anse à la Graisse (later known as New Madrid, Missouri) and Bayou Pierre. The settlement had no public buildings; a church would not be built for another decade. White families resident on Bayou Pierre and the Big Black at that time lived in small nuclear-family households, and if they owned slaves the count was in the single digits. The earliest surviving description of Bruinsburg dates to March 25, 1801: "pass't Judge Bruin's at the lower side of a creek called Biopere...some Houses but no improvements worth notice". The fullest description of life on pre-territorial Bayou Pierre comes from the autobiography of Confederate general and Reconstruction-era Mississippi governor Benjamin G. Humphreys, recapitulating the memories and legends of three generations of his family: (Note: This passage has been lightly edited for readability, primarily commas and numerals, along with the excision by ellipsis of some distracting emotional racism. Catamount and panther are both common names for Puma concolor.)

In 1793 my father and mother moved from Grind Stone Ford to a tract of land on the north side of the Big Bayou Pierre known as the 'Hermitage' held by my mother by grant from the Spanish Government. At this time, what is now known as Claiborne County was an unbroken wilderness tenanted only by about five white families, a few vagabond Spaniards, strolling Choctaw Indians, the bear, the panther, the catamount, the wolf, and the deer...Corn, rice, indigo, and tobacco were the only agricultural products then introduced. Cotton gins were unknown, mills were unknown, and corn had to be converted into meal by means of coffee mills and the mortar and pestle. Nothing could be spared from the scanty subsistence of the settler for market. [Wild animals] destroyed pigs and calves, poultry, and corn fields. Sheep were unknown. In a great measure the pioneer had to rely on his trusty rifle for the 'creature comforts' of life. Peltry, tobacco monopolized by the Government, indigo, and white oak staves transported in piroques to Natchez and N. Orleans were the only articles of commerce and the pioneer's only dependence for a supply of sugar, coffee, medicines, powder, and lead. I heard my father say that he never saw the day his family suffered for want of food or raiment; but for the first 15 years of his married life he did not see $15 in money that he could call his own. My mother and a negro woman...did the 'chores' of the household, spun the thread and wove the cloth for the entire family, white and black. My father, two negro men and two women, cleared the field, built the cabins, cultivated the crops, and replenished the smoke house with wild game and fish. My older brothers and sisters fed the pigs, herded the cattle, gathered the eggs, and wormed the tobacco patch...

— The Life of Benjamin Grubb Humphreys (c. 1878)

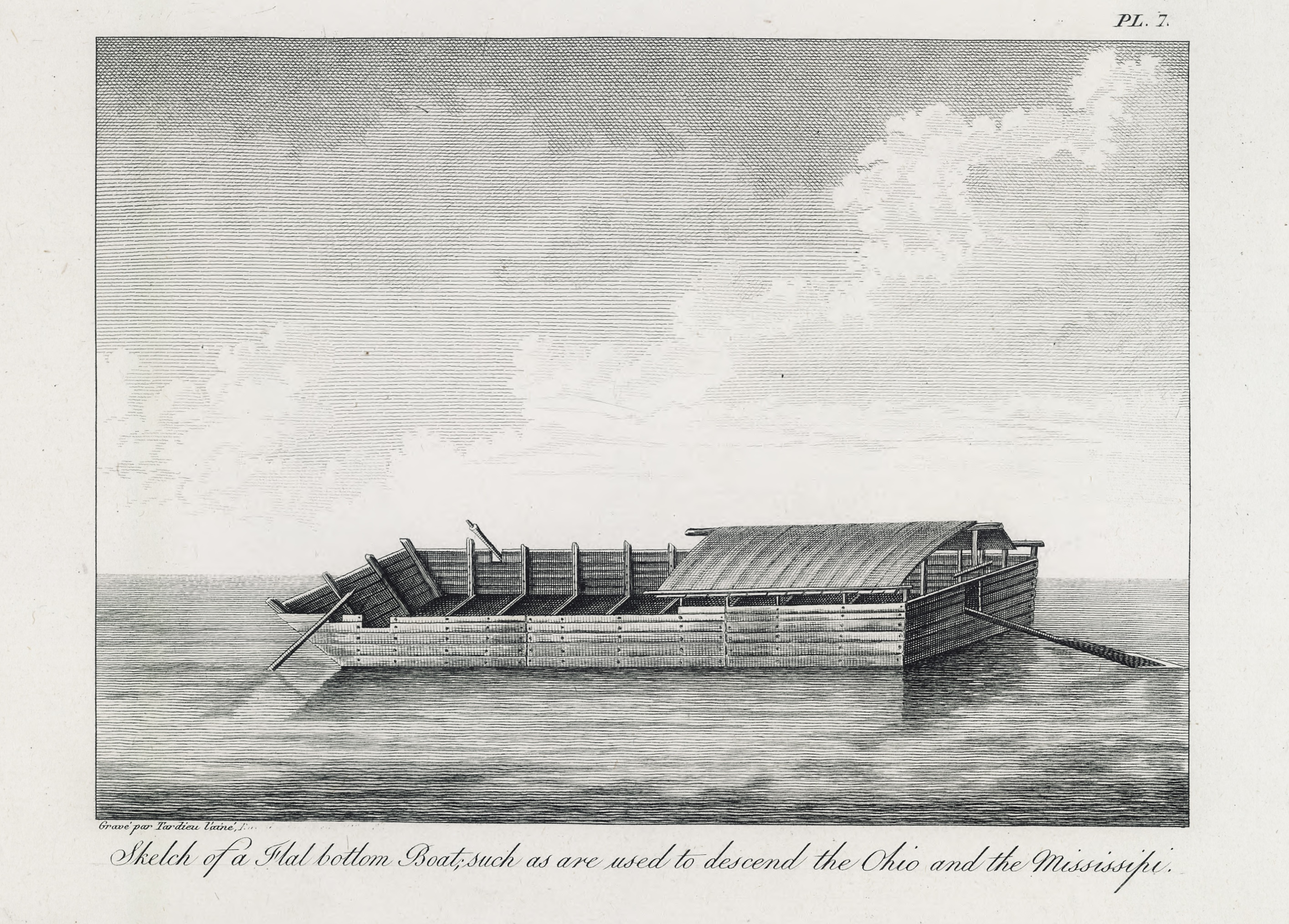
Etching, from a sketch made by Collot in 1795, depicting a flatboat, sometimes called an ark, voiture, broadhorn, Kentucky boat, New Orleans boat, or raft (Voyage dans l'Amerique Septentrionale, 1826, LCCN 01021531)

Despite Humphreys' belief that the Spanish government had "blazed out" the Natchez Trace, the entire continent had long had an "intricate network of Indian trails. Many of the first routes taken by the settlers, and subsequently made into roads, originally were Indian trails", including the road between Nashville and Knoxville, and the route through the Shenandoah Valley. In any case, on July 15, 1789, Jackson was in the Natchez District swearing allegiance to the king of Spain so that he could trade there without paying a tax intended for non-resident American traders. The gist of such a pledge was that "U.S. immigrants commonly exploited Spanish regulations awarding land gratis to foreigners who appeared sincere in their pledges of loyalty and bona fide settlement...The 'general system' of colonization...was 'that of making speculative incursions, and reaping the advantages the country afforded, under the pretence of becoming, at some future day, a Settler'." In August 1789 Mississippi planter Thomas M. Green Jr. granted power of attorney to the young lawyer. Jackson's brother-in-law John Donelson lived in the Villa Gayoso district near Cole's Creek in the 1790s. Jackson could also pursue his hobbies in Natchez: there was a quarter-mile (400 m) racetrack at Natchez-Under-the-Hill as early as 1788, and the St. Catherine course, later to come to fame as the Pharsalia Race Course, was likely in operation by 1790. The jockeys and grooms at these tracks were enslaved African Americans, and horses and slaves alike were used for stakes.

Jackson might have been a transient or itinerant trader, which was common. If he had a physical store it would likely have been log-built, or possibly the frame cabin of his "emigrant boat" deconstructed and rebuilt to the same purpose on land. According to biographer Robert V. Remini, young Jackson made the acquaintance of "a great many Natchez businessmen and through them began an extensive trading operation." Preserved letters from 1790 between Jackson and "Melling Woolley, a Natchez merchant" record goods being carried from Nashville to Natchez, including "cases of wine and rum; also a snuff box, dolls, muslin, salt, sugar, knives and iron pots." Another letter of 1790 thanks Jackson for his help with the "Little Venture of Swann Skins", which historian Harriet Chappell Owsley asserted were feathers or down stuffing for pillows and mattresses, but which other scholars believe described a shipment of slaves. Letters show that James Robertson tasked Jackson with delivering a runaway slave to the Spanish colonial governor, Manuel Gayoso de Lemos. An estimated 70,000 enslaved people were imported into the United States from overseas between 1791 and 1807, but fortunately for Jackson, business opportunities for American slave-traders abounded in 1790s Natchez, because the beginning of the Haitian Revolution in 1791 had disrupted the once-reliable supply of slaves from the Caribbean islands, easing competition. This same Saint-Domingue slave revolt killed the island's sugar trade and thus disintegrated the economic undergirding of a dual-hemisphere Napoleonic empire, opening the way for the American Louisiana Purchase.

The study of Jackson's earliest slave trading is closely tied to the study of the Robards–Donelson–Jackson relationship controversy. Jackson and Rachel Robards née Donelson ran off together sometime between the summer of 1789 and July 1790, leaving behind Rachel's allegedly abusive first husband Lewis Robards. An 1890 news article purporting to tell "the true story of the great statesman's matrimonial venture" claimed that "near Natchez...there used to stand a ruined log hut, which was pointed out to strangers as the spot where they had passed their honeymoon. This was, no doubt, the spot to which he carried her when they first ran away..." (Note: This claim from the 1890 St. Louis Post-Dispatch article was pointedly attacked by S. G. Heiskell in his "History Again Refutes Slanders of Noted Hero" article three decades later.) Rev. John Griffing Jones, a native of Jefferson County, Mississippi, and a "pioneer Methodist historian in Mississippi", had been insisting since the 1870s that Rachel Jackson Robards had had a double log house with an open hall ("two pens and a passage") on a small farm located 1.5 miles (2.4 km) southwest of Old Greenville on the Natchez Trace, opposite Belle Grove plantation.

The young couple returned to Nashville in a party of 100 or more via the Natchez Trace in July 1790, with Hugh McGary attesting at Rachel's divorce proceedings that the couple were "bedding together" on the journey. By 1792 Jackson had finances sufficient to buy Poplar Grove on Jones' Bend in Davidson County. That same year, Spanish emissary Stephen Minor recorded in his journal of a diplomatic mission to the Choctaw, "Franchimastabé answered me that he had reason to believe that what I had told him was true, so he was determined to live prepared, as he was not unaware of the desire of the Americans to take the Lands of the Indians and always to impoverish them, which they were able to do." In 1794, the year Jackson and Rachel Donelson were legally married in Tennessee, the Spanish reported that the Choctaw and Chickasaw were looking to them for food, and were collectively "in a wretched condition...[some] dying of hunger." In 1797, Chickasaw leader Ugulayacabé told the Spanish commandant at San Fernando de las Barrancas, Joseph Deville Degoutin Bellechasse, that in the "speeches and prodigalities" of the Americans—soon to take over many of Spain's colonial possessions east of the Mississippi—"the Chickasaws could perceive the behavior of 'the rattlesnake that caresses the squirrel in order to devour it.'"

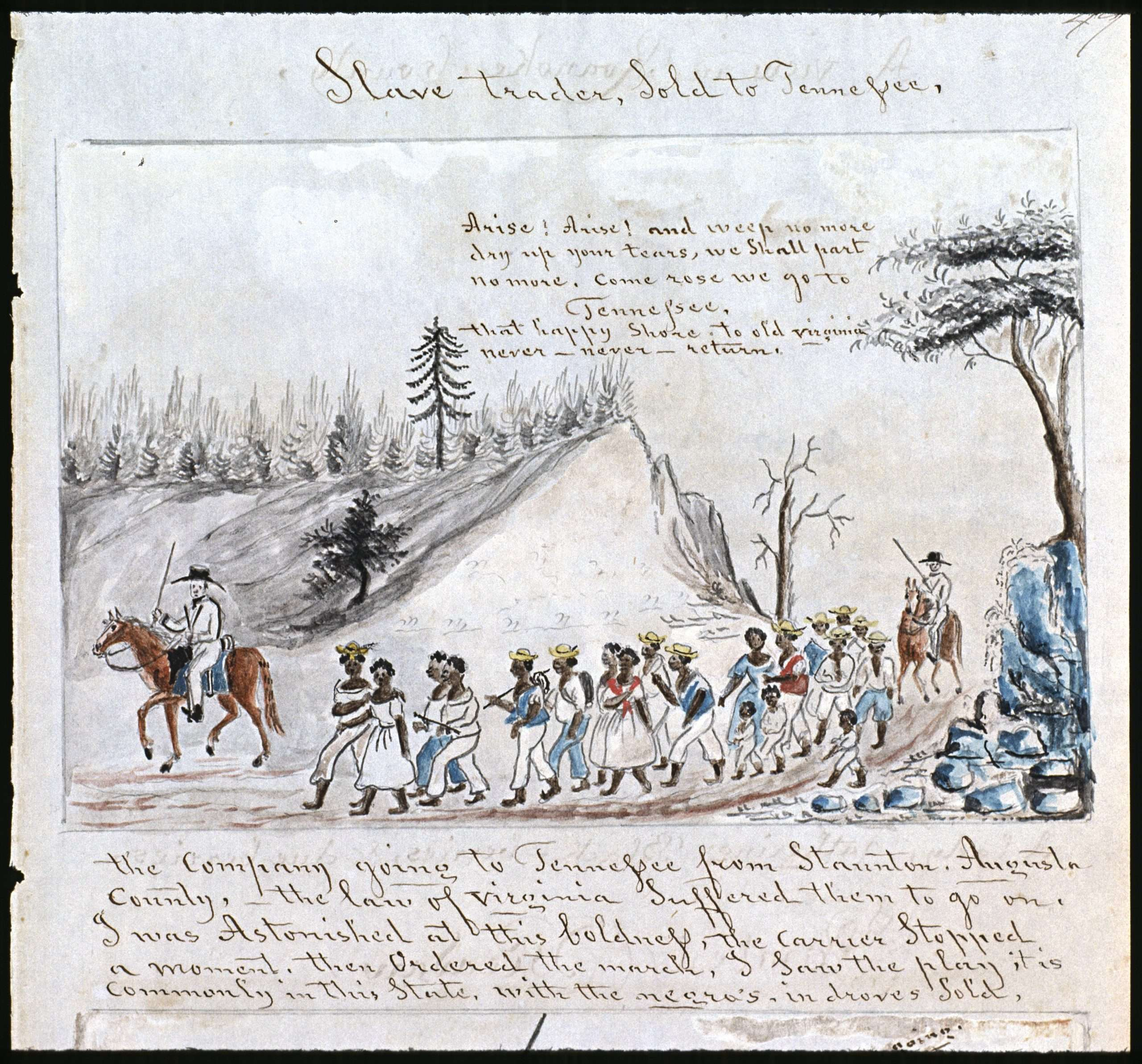
In a testimonial collected for American Slavery As It Is (1839), a Rhode Island man wrote, "I recollect seeing large gangs of slaves, generally a considerable number in each gang, being chained, passing westward over the mountains from Maryland, Virginia, &c. to the Ohio. On that river I have frequently seen flat boats loaded with them, and their keepers armed with pistols and dirks to guard them." ("Slave Trader, Sold to Tennessee", Lewis Miller, c. 1850, Abby Aldrich Rockefeller Folk Art Museum)

It is unclear where Jackson collected the enslaved people he carried south, and in what quantities of people he trafficked. Until Robertson's 1794 Nickajack Expedition tied off the bloody conflict with the Cherokee, the Cumberland district remained "as violent a world as any American ever inhabited." The Cumberland was almost an island in the land; one historian wrote that "the Cumberland Basin provides a good example of the often jagged, leapfrog pattern of settlement. The frontier was less like a tier or line than a loosely joined series of salients, tongues, and 'bubbles'. Davidson County was a bubble separated from the older Tennessee settlements by several hundred miles of wilderness." Nashville proper remained but a small settlement in this era, with a total population in 1800 of about 350 people, approximately 150 of whom were slaves. Davidson County (which in 1800 encompassed large portions of what are now Cheatham and Rutherford counties) was largely populated by Jackson's kin, including 39 in-laws or direct descendants of John Donelson. As one history put it, "The entire neighborhood was made up largely of Donelsons and their connections, each possessing plantations of a thousand or more acres." In 1790, more than half of all Black Americans lived in just two states, Virginia and Maryland (with the vast majority of the remainder dwelling in North Carolina and South Carolina, although there were at that time also substantial populations of slaves living in Delaware, Georgia, New York, New Jersey, and Pennsylvania). Delaware, Maryland, and Virginia were "already net exporters" of slaves in the 1790s, shortly joined by the District of Columbia, and North Carolina, whereas Tennessee, admitted in 1796 as the 16th U.S. state, would not become a net exporter of slaves until the 1850s.

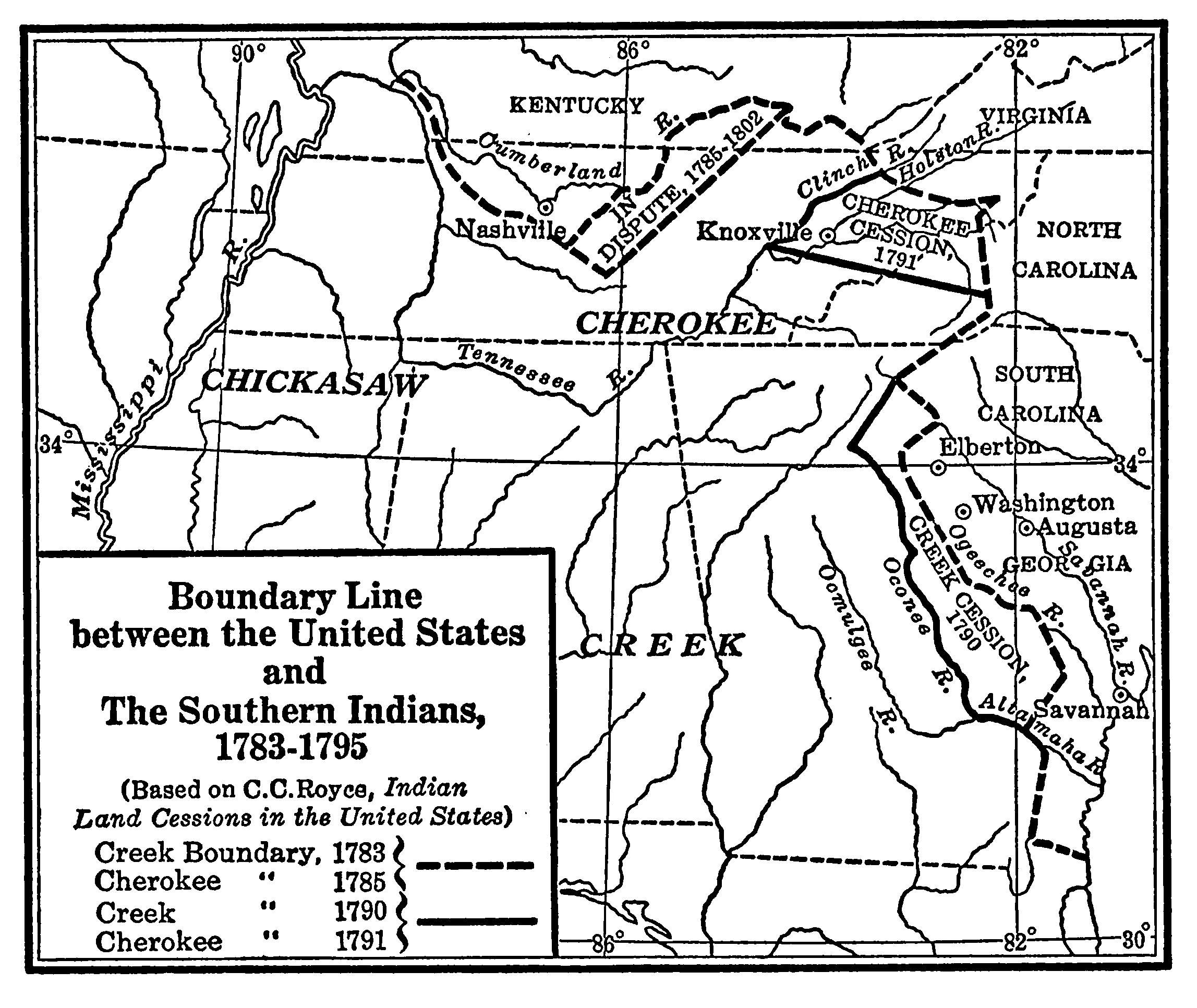
"Boundary line between the United States and the southern Indians" (Arthur P. Whitaker, The Spanish-American Frontier: 1783–1795, 1927)

Historians know not to what purpose Jackson "crossed the wilderness between Knoxville and Nashville 22 times—once alone, 'when the Indians were most numerous and hostile.'" The old "drovers' road" from the Carolinas went to Knoxville through the Saluda Gap, and Knoxville was the Tennessee starting point for the Philadelphia Wagon Road (Jackson's brief service in Fourth and Fifth United States Congresses certainly gave him occasion to visit the national capital then located in Philadelphia). Philadelphia to Pittsburgh, in western Pennsylvania, offered a connection to comparatively swift travel southwest via the Ohio River. From 1798 to 1804, Jackson had the travel obligations of a Tennessee state judge. During Nashville's earliest history, "Philadelphia being the favorite market of the Nashville merchants, they would leave here on horseback, and it would take them nearly six weeks to reach the city of 'Brotherly Love'. All purchases were then sent through by wagons." Shipping between Baltimore and Nashville involved "six-horse teams" that cost $10 for every 100 pounds of freight. The return route from Baltimore or Philadelphia to Nashville went "across the Alleghenies, through Jonesboro, Knoxville, and Kingston, and then across the Cumberland Mountains, via Sparta and Lebanon to Nashville."

In 1795, to stock the store he and his brother-in-law Samuel Donelson ran at Hunter's Hill, Jackson set off on a work trip to Philadelphia intending to buy trade goods and to sell lands that were still legally under Indian title. There Jackson "traded land preemptions for flour, sugar, piece goods, and pocket knives." Before Jackson departed, friend John Overton cautioned him, "If you purchase Negroes in any of the northern States, be careful in so doing not to subject yourself to the penal Laws of the State." (Note: Pennsylvania passed abolition by "gradual emancipation" in 1780, which meant that slavery and indentured servitude persisted in the state until the 1840s.) On November 30, 1799, Judge Jackson agreed to a slave swap between himself, Judge Overton, and a man named Carter. Jackson was to take a couple owned by Carter, writing Overton, "They will [serve] my Purpose to Sell again."

== Slave trading, 1800–1804 ==
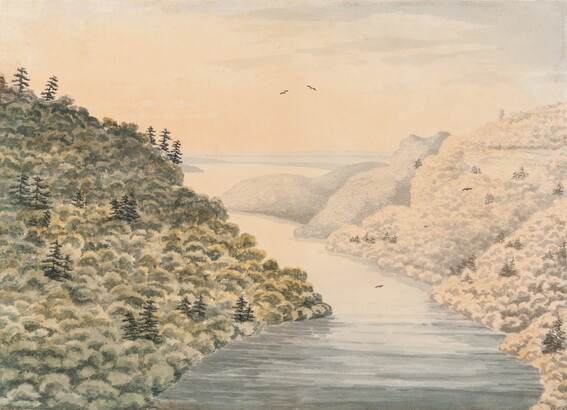
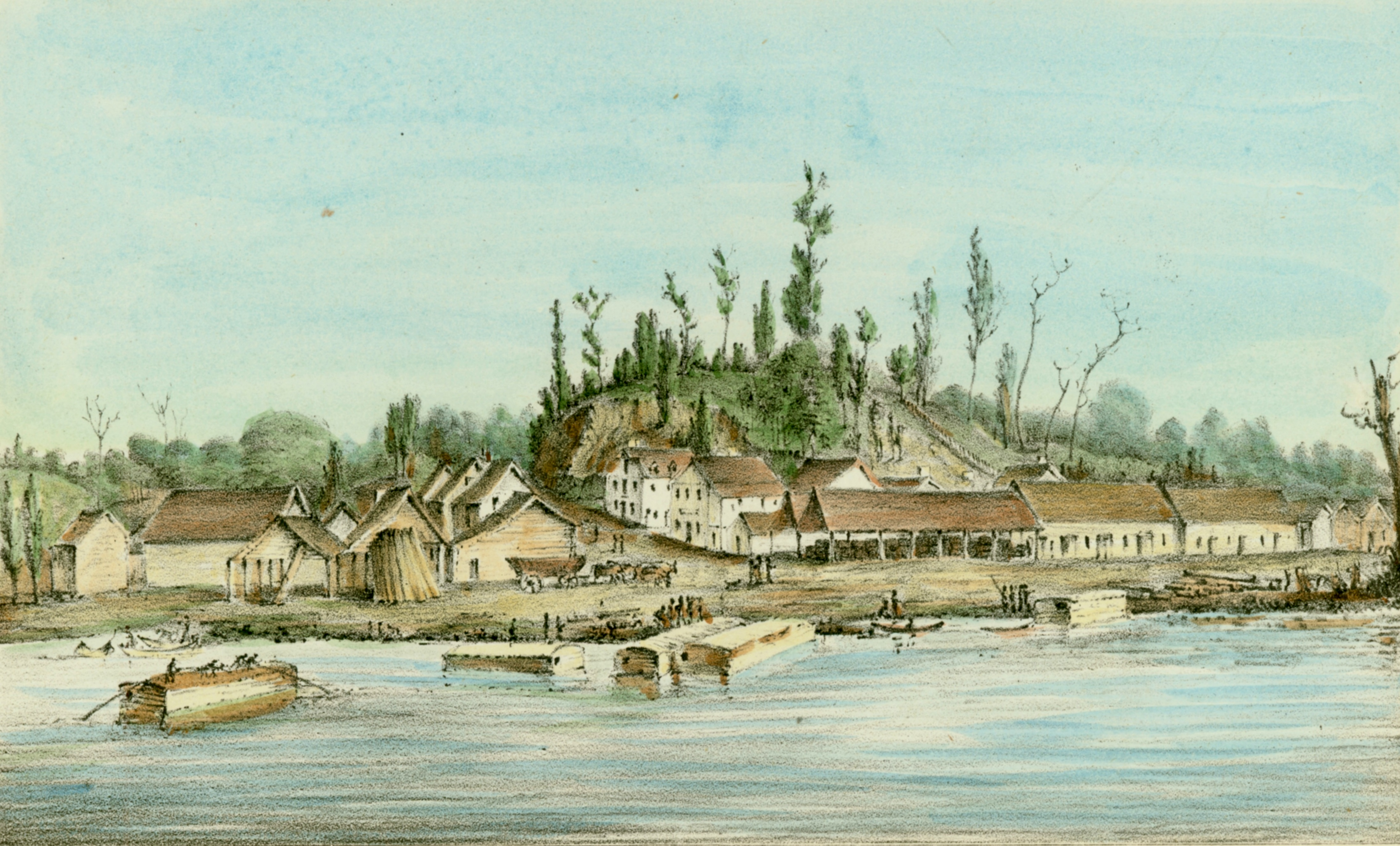
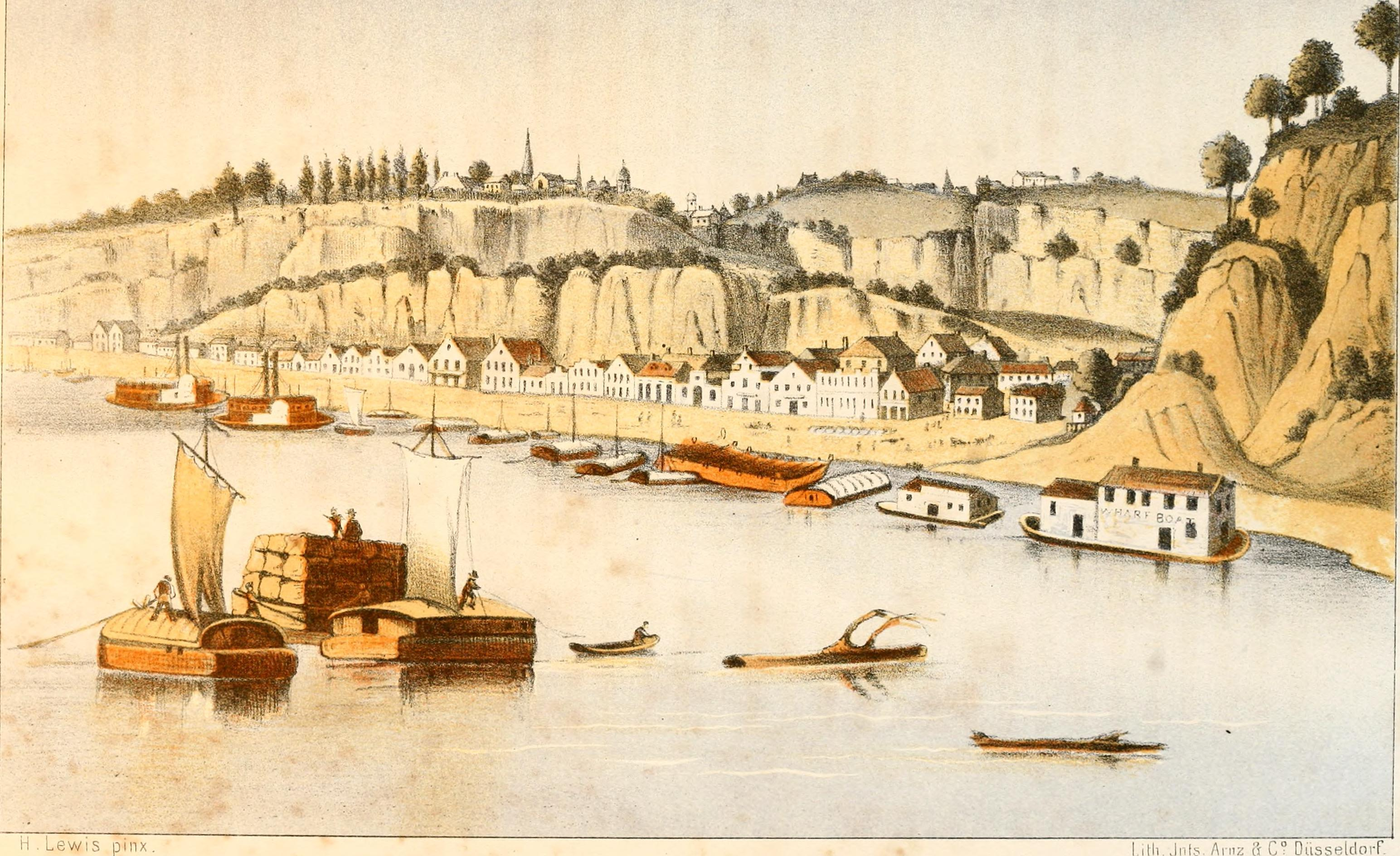
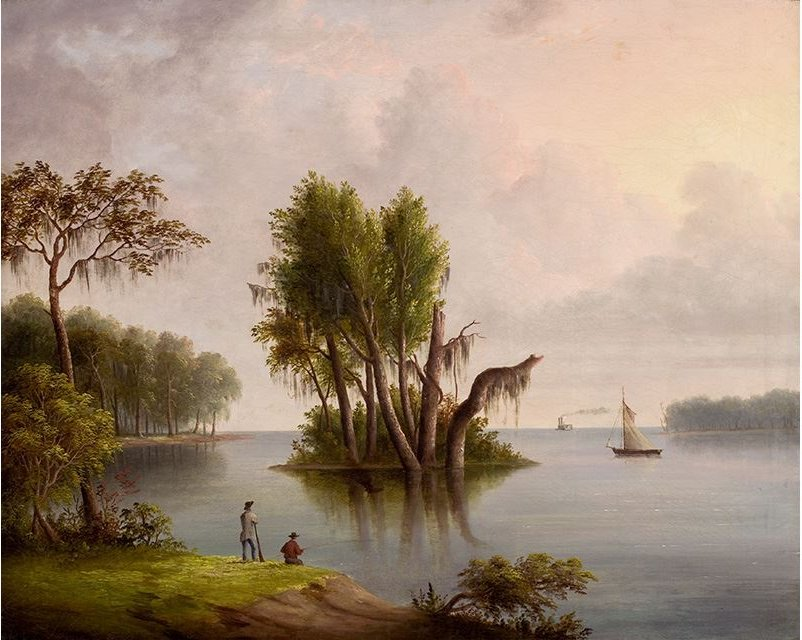
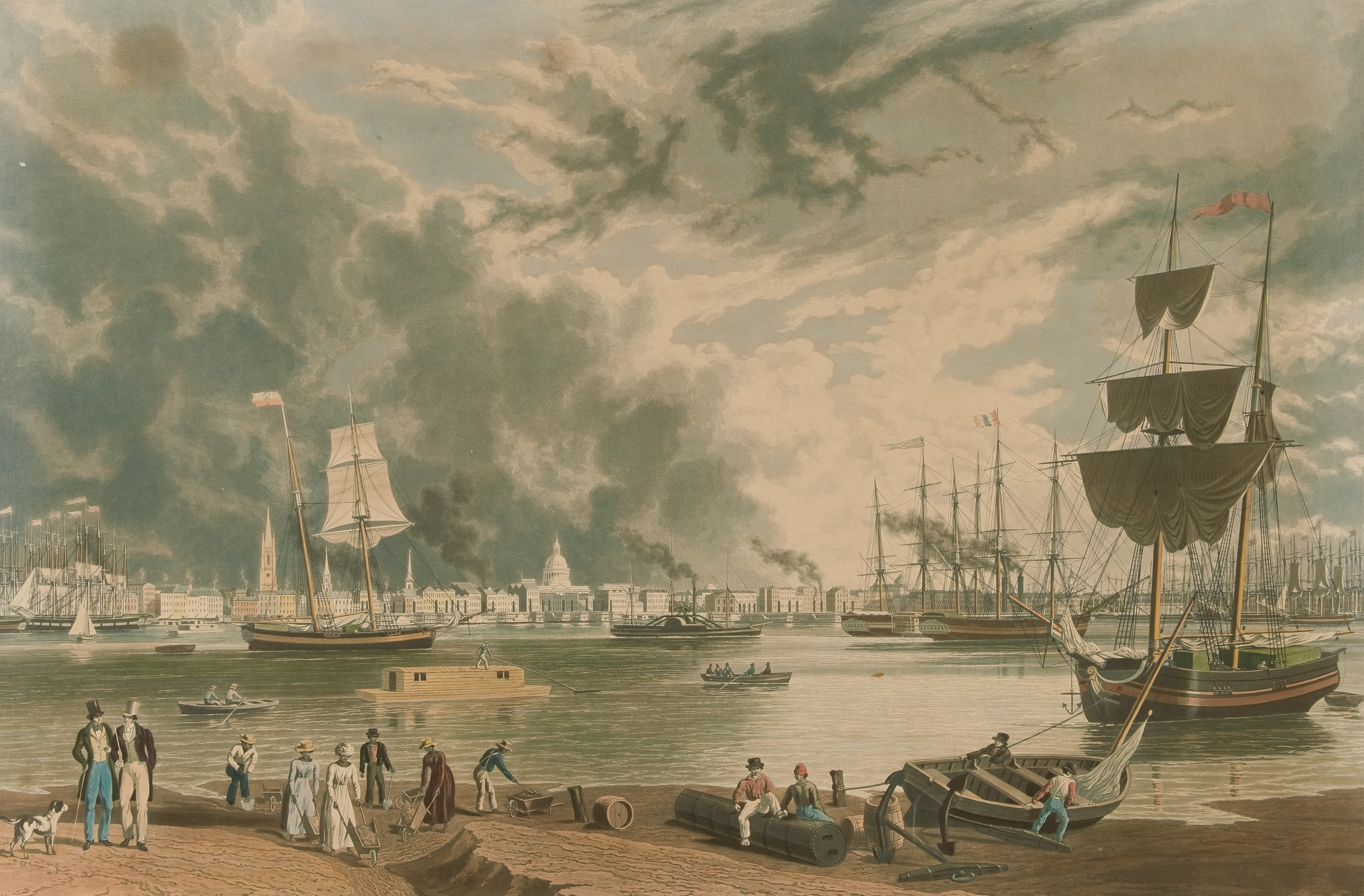
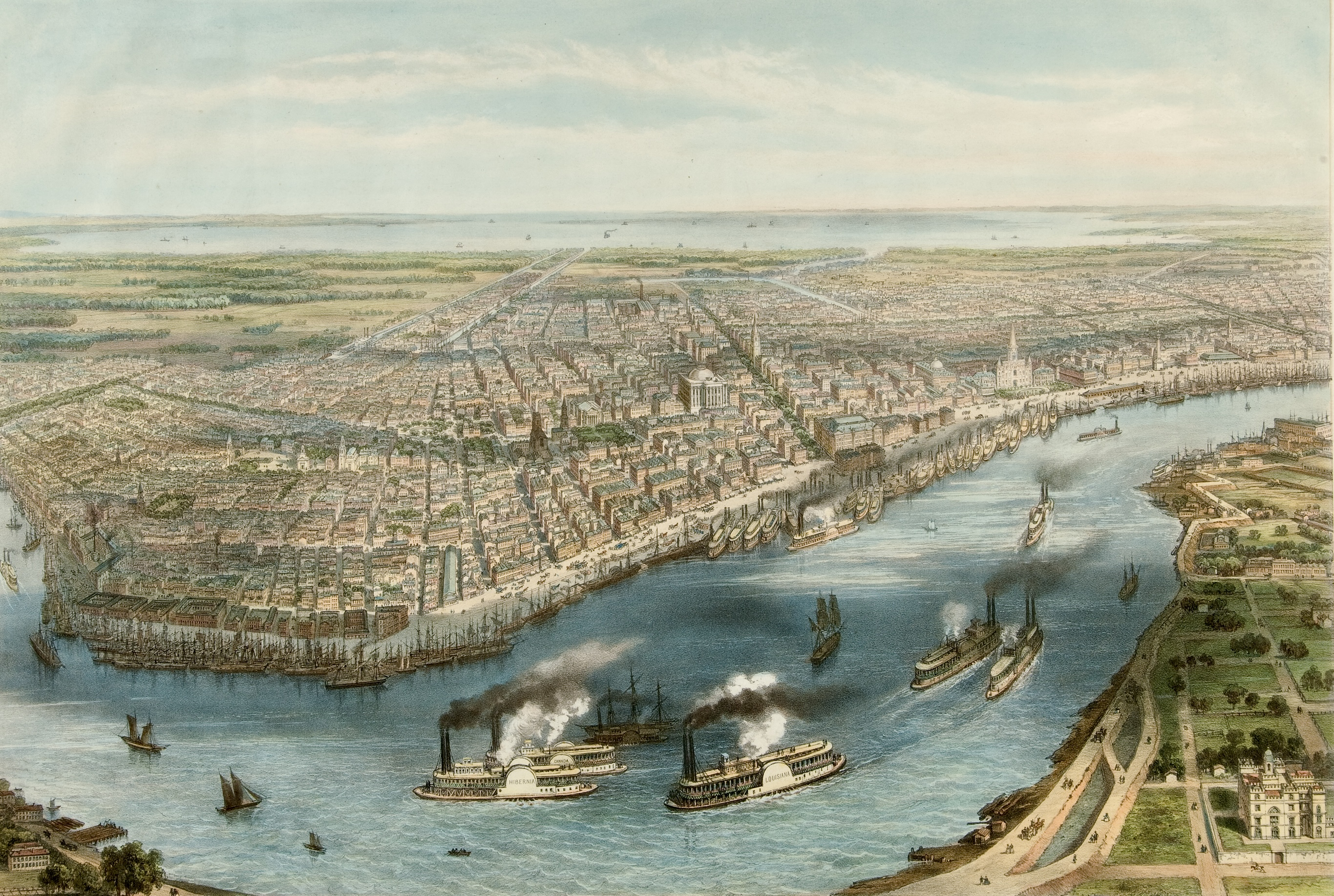
Upstream from Natchez c. 1807 by William Constable; view of Petit Gulf in the 1820s by Charles Alexandre Lesueur; Natchez landing in the 1830s by Henry Lewis; the mighty Mississippi, probably in the 1840s, painted by Robert Brammer; New Orleans levee in 1841 by William James Bennett; Vue Generale de la Nouvelle-Orleans c. 1854 by Théodore Müller

In his 2013 biography, Andrew Jackson, Southerner, historian Mark R. Cheathem wrote, "Historian Charles Sellers once argued that after 1804 'never again was Jackson to engage in any considerable speculative venture.' The facts do not bear out this claim. Jackson speculated widely in land during the 1810s in an effort to benefit himself. Given his direct involvement in land seizures during the 1810s and his subsequent correspondence about prospects in Alabama, Florida, and the Mississippi Territory, it stretches credulity to imagine that he did not calculate these moves to help his land-speculating associates turn a profit as well." Similarly, Jackson was still opportunistically trading slaves well into the 19th century, certainly until the Battle of New Orleans in 1815 made him a national figure. Jackson's brother-in-law John Caffery announced in autumn 1800 that he had taken up the business of freighting to New Orleans and would sell Tennessee produce there for a commission of five percent of the sale price. When Jackson sold Betty and her 15-year-old daughter Hannah to Abraham Green on December 27, 1800, the sale price of $550 for the pair was almost equivalent to Jackson's $600 annual salary as a Tennessee state judge. According to Frederic Bancroft's Slave-Trading in the Old South (1931), letters in the Jackson papers at the Library of Congress demonstrate his continuing interest in the market. For instance, territorial governor William C. C. Claiborne wrote to Jackson from "near Natchez" on December 9, 1801, with an update on local markets:

"The Races in this District, commenced yesterday, and will hold for three days; Mr. Hutchings has attended the Race today, and will proceed from thence, to Mr. Green's, where he has left the Negroes & Horses. Mr. H. will be at my House, next Week; in the mean time, I will try to find a purchaser for your Horses, as for Negroes, they are in great demand, and will sell well. There is hardly any Corn in this District, and so soon, as the pumpkins give out, Horses will Suffer, & hence it is, they are not at present in demand; But if Mr. H. should bring his horses to Natchez, I will try to sell them, to the best advantage."

A couple of weeks later, an update from Claiborne:

"I had the pleasure to deliver in person your Letters to Mr. Hutchins; he is now at my House, & is in good health & Spirits. The Negro Woman he has sold for 500 dolls. in Cash, and I believe he has, or will in a few days sell the Boy, for his own price, to Colo. West. The Horses are not yet disposed of, but I hope he will meet a purchaser, in a day or two. I shall on Tomorrow, set off for Fort Adams, & Mr. Hutchings has promised to accompany me; previous to our return, I hope, we shall be enabled to sell the Horses. I can assure you, with great truth, that Mr. Hutchings is a prudent, amiable young man, & is very attentive to your Interest."

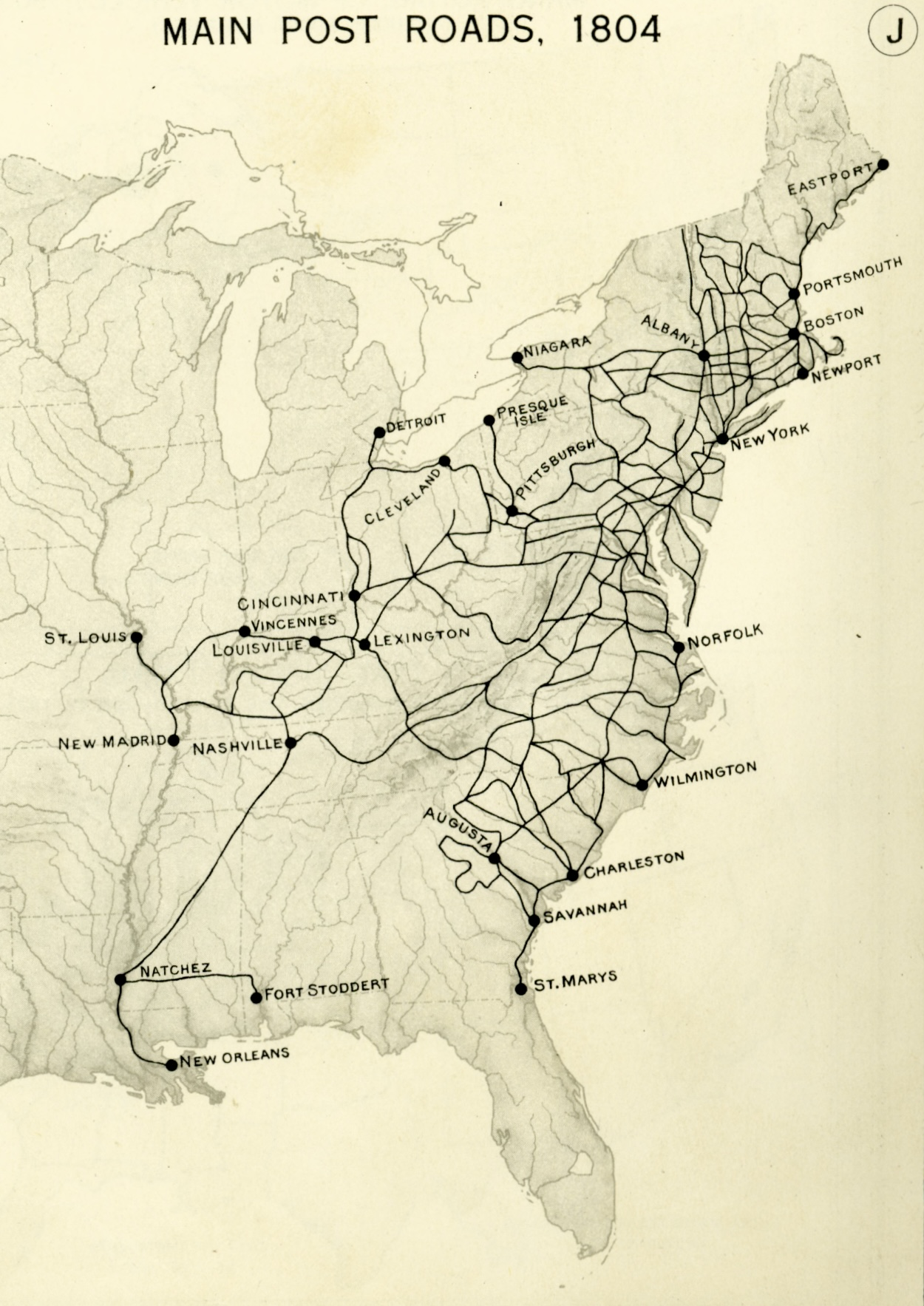
The U.S. government survey of the Trace was a geopolitical use case for the Pythagorean theorem; for the 30 years after the Louisiana Purchase, American politics were largely consumed with acquiring the remainder of the land between the Atlantic and the Mississippi River ("United States main post roads c. 1804", mapped by Charles O. Paullin, 1932)

John Hutchings was Andrew Jackson's nephew-by-marriage. Rachel Donelson's older sister Catherine married Thomas Hutchings; John Hutchings was their firstborn son. Hutchings was "Jackson's partner in the Lebanon, Gallatin, and Hunter's Hill stores." On Christmas 1801 Hutchings wrote Jackson with his own update on the sale items described by Claiborne, declaring, "I shall meet with no dificulty to sell the negres...you may rest asurd that money is my hole thought." On January 9, 1802, Claiborne wrote Jackson, "On our way from the Fort, Mr. Hutchins Sold two of his Horses, and a Negro Boy to advantage." The tandem vending of horse flesh and human flesh was common. As Bancroft explained in 1931, in many antebellum Southern marketplaces, "the same man dealt in horses, mules, and slaves." Similarly, Calvin Schermerhorn, writing about the ocean-going "coastwise" slave trade, stated, "On nearly all American coastal voyages on which slaves were transported in the 1810s and early 1820s, the accent fell on shipping nonhuman cargoes", meaning that the "main" cargo was coal or rum or cowhides or cotton or porcelain, but shippers moving goods between any two points where slavery was legal were as likely as not to have a few slaves aboard as well, bound for resale wherever inventory was low and prices were high.

In 1803 Jackson took custody of an enslaved Black man named Bird; Jackson had served as guarantor for a $500 credit line extended to a free White man named Mark Mitchell; when Mitchell could not pay his debt, Jackson repossessed Bird to resell to raise some or all of the money owed. In 1804, as Jackson's Tennessee stores busily traded steel for bearskins, he wrote a long letter arguing with a trading partner about their arrangement:

"...that Mr. H would carry on negroes to exchange for groceries, and wishing you to make a sale of them before he came if you could, that a fellow answering the description you wanted was bought, but I was fearfull he would not suit you as he had once left his master and so forth but as to stating that he had sufficient funds with him to pay all our debts cannot be correct..."

The John Gordon House was built along the Natchez Trace in Hickman County, Tennessee c. 1818. Gordon's widow resided there until her death in 1859. (LCCN ms0318)

In 1926, historian John Spencer Bassett wrote in The Correspondence of Andrew Jackson, "This letter shows Jackson's method of carrying on a controversy in his early life. It also contains the clearest available evidence that his trading firm bought and sold negroes." On February 14, 1804, Jackson, Robertson, U.S. District Court Judge John McNairy, and surveyor William T. Lewis were "subscribers" to a contract between John Gordon (later Jackson's personal spymaster in the wars of the 1810s) and William Colbert (one of the mixed-race Colbert brothers of the Chickasaw Nation), agreeing to establish and jointly operate a stand and ferry across the Duck River along the Natchez Trace. A 22-year-old named Thomas Hart Benton was hired as a clerk, or "factor", to help run the Duck River place. It has been said that Benton "speculated his way to a small fortune even before he reached his 21st birthday," but it goes unmentioned in what, exactly, he speculated. Age 21 would not have been a particularly precocious mercantile debut; Andrew Jackson was already deemed a "shrewd" trader of horses at age 15.

Jackson was up to his neck in debt that year, so, Remini summarizes, "To pay what he owed, Jackson returned full time to his business interests in 1804. He resigned the judgeship, sold his plantation at Hunter's Hill (where for a time he had operated a small store and from a narrow window sold goods to the Indians), disposed of an additional 25,000 acres (10,000 ha) he held in various parts of the state (he continued his land speculation despite the Allison disaster)...Through consolidation and liquidation he managed to pay off all his debts. It meant starting all over again financially, and it meant living in a log cabin once again." Presidential historian John R. Irelan told much the same tale in 1887, albeit with more color:

Allison failed, and Jackson had to pay the notes which he had exchanged for goods. This piece of ill-fortune greatly embarrassed him, and was one cause of his quitting the 'Bench' in 1804, a position for which he was, in most respects, totally unfit. From this time forward he did not concern himself about learned offices. He was general of the militia, and that was enough...he did not make the remotest attempt to farm on scientific principles. He simply kept up as well as he could, with the condition of affairs as made by others...He also raised fine horses. During all this time he seldom took a law case, and finally ceased to do so entirely. He studied very little, and never did at any time know or care a great deal about law. Although living quietly and happily at home with a wife whom he adored, and who, to a great extent, managed the large number of negroes he collected about him, his life at this time was reckless, dissipated, and far from exemplary in most things.

== Slave trading, 1805–1809 ==
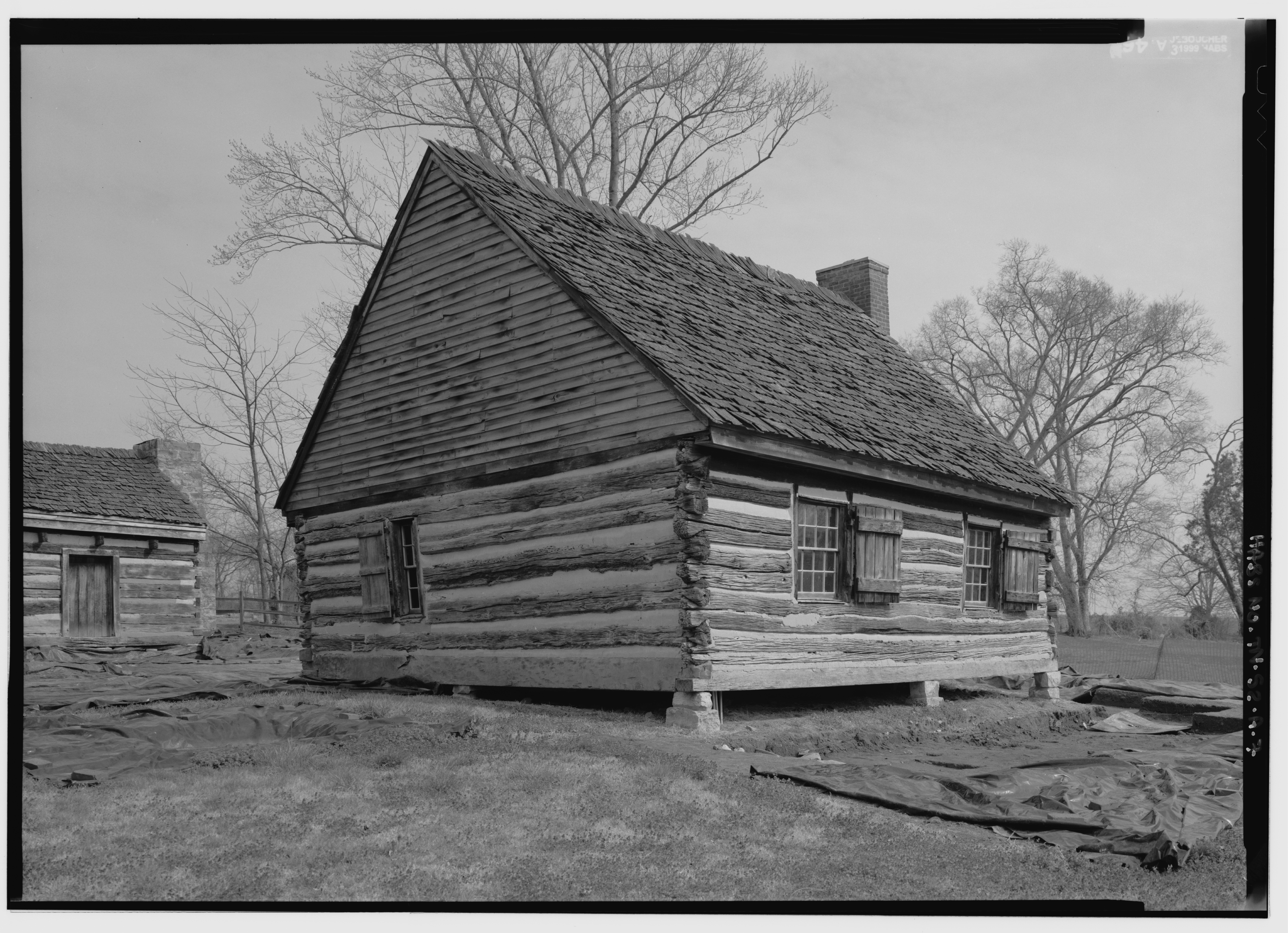
"The Log Hermitage" of 1805: Per the Ladies' Hermitage Association, "the building in the foreground was once a two-story blockhouse." Dendrochronology studies found that this building, now called West Cabin, was built 1798–1800 from tulip poplar. The building in the background, East Cabin, was built around 1805–1806 and was used as the kitchen during the Log Hermitage days. These buildings were later repurposed as slave quarters. (HABS TN-52-A-7)

In June 1805, Jackson wrote Edward Ward, the buyer of Hunter's Hill, that he could not accept slaves as a form of payment, because of timing: "I cannot believe that you are seriously impressed with the belief, that you are now authorised to discharge a part thereof in negroes—had negroes been offerred before Mr Hutchings descended the river with negroes for sale they would have been recd." Some traders worked all year to collect what were called "shipping lots" of slaves, but Jackson apparently rejected Ward's midsummer offering as inauspiciously timed.

Also, according to Gen. Jackson's Negro Speculations, Jackson bought a child from a Dr. Rollings of Gallatin in 1805 or 1806, with the intent to resell him in the "lower country", and later sued the doctor over the boy's health condition. The documents timeline in The Papers of Andrew Jackson includes three mentions of a case known as Andrew Jackson and John Hutchings v. Benjamin Rawlings. The suit seems to have been initiated in approximately September 1805, a decision was rendered in September 1808, and an appeal decision was handed down in March 1813. There is an 1828 letter from Jackson "casually" explaining that possession of this "negro boy", who had been "kept at the Clover Bottom at our store", had been uncertain in part because he was abducted as the result of "a race...the stakes...which was to be in cash or negroes as I understood." (Note: For more on the Jackson campaign's response to Erwin's charges about this case, see "Letter from William B. Lewis to John Coffee, July 27, 1828". Dyas Collection of John Coffee Papers, Series: THS II-A-2, Box: 11, Folder 3, ID: 43054. Tennessee Historical Society.) The "negro boy" in question was named Charles and had been born in approximately 1793, meaning he was about 12 years old when Jackson had purchased him for purposes of resale. According to Jackson, Charles eventually died, either from a sore on his leg that "broke out" or from a "disease engen[der]ed in the lower country." In the Correspondence, Bassett annotated this Jackson letter with the following note defending the president's reputation: "An article in the Nashville Banner and Whig of Aug. 1, 1828, had brought up this incident in support of the charge that Jackson was a negro trader. That he took slaves in settlement of accounts and sold them for money is undoubtedly true. But he was never a negro trader in the ordinary meaning of the term."

In October 1828, the final issue of the Monthly Anti-Jackson Expositor published a letter that had allegedly been written by Jackson to William P. Anderson in January 1807. Anderson, a U.S. Attorney and father of J. Patton Anderson (a future housemate of Nathan Bedford Forrest and another future Confederate general), had been one of Jackson's closest associates in the 1800s and 1810s, but by 1828 had turned into a lacerating critic. Per the Expositor, "When...[Jackson's] correspondence, such as is actually and unquestionably his own, comes to be inspected...All the rules of composition, of orthography, and of syntax, are disregarded, and a most reprehensible ignorance is made manifest...The occasion of writing it...was the receipt of the President's proclamation respecting Burr, and a letter from the Secretary of War on the same subject. And it is certainly remarkable for the cool indifference with which private receipts, a negro-trading bargain, contempt for the Secretary of War, and consultations for the suppression of a supposed wide-spreading treason are commingled together." As to the bargain, Jackson had written Anderson, "...the Negro girl, if likely, at a fair price, I will receive...if you [find it] Convenient bring the girl with you..."

In March 1807, Jackson purchased 15 slaves at a sheriff's auction of the property of his neighbor and brother-in-law Robert Hays. (By Jackson's influence as a member of the U.S. House of Representatives, Hays had been appointed in 1797 to be the first U.S. marshal of the new-formed federal judicial district of Tennessee.) Jackson then conveyed those 15 slaves back to Hays' wife Jane Donelson Hays. In 1807 Hays had recently declared bankruptcy, and during the 1828 election this action was alleged to be a conspiracy intended to defraud Hays' creditors, essentially money laundering enslaved assets.

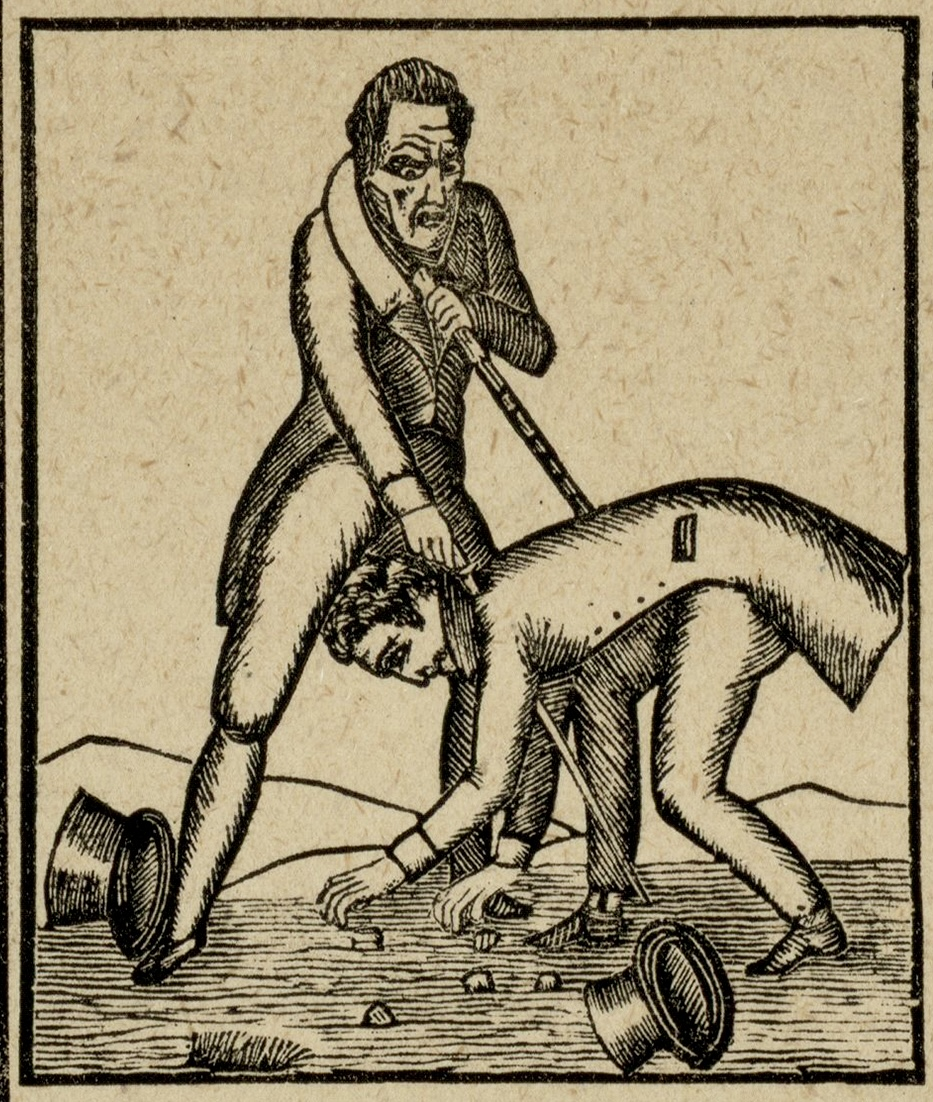
Woodcut engraving from the Coffin Handbills distributed the 1828 U.S. presidential campaign, depicting Andrew Jackson stabbing Samuel Jackson with a cane-sword in 1807, an action said to have been in self-defense, because S. Jackson had thrown a rock at A. Jackson's head; this was one of a number of documented physical fights involving Jackson

Jackson's trading activity had seemingly ramped up again in 1807, as in February there was also an exchange with Samuel Dorsey Jackson involving a "growing gaming debt" and a "Negro woman." Samuel Jackson wrote Andrew Jackson, "I would like to keep her as long as it was in your power to do without her, as we have but little help." Bassett annotated the first of two letters about this debt with the comment: "This sentence seems to mean that the negro woman was to go on the boat." A month later, on March 6, 1807, 39-year-old Andrew Jackson jumped 55-year-old Samuel Jackson on the street, such that "on May 15, 1807...a Davidson County grand jury presented to the Mero District Superior Court an indictment against Jackson for 'assault with intent to kill' Samuel Dorsey Jackson." The reported motive for the attack was an unpaid debt; former state judge Jackson was acquitted of the charge in November 1807. (Note: Samuel Dorsey Jackson (September 16, 1755 – May 2, 1836) was a Revolutionary War veteran and real estate speculator who had done high-leverage land deals with the likes of Founding Father Robert Morris and Tennessee founder John Sevier. He had "dealt with Andrew Jackson in land, slaves, and horses" since at least 1799. S. Jackson's youngest son had been just born in January 1807 and grew up to be Confederate general Alfred E. Jackson.) In 1808, an economic recession hit the United States, depressing the value of both cotton and slaves until 1814. By 1809 the transatlantic slave trade was officially closed and the interregional trade became the only legal way to procure slaves, but not without an incipient domestic resistance; one Baltimore slave buyer anxiously wrote his cousin in July 1809, "The Quakers and Abolitions have been so violent on men of our business that I'm afraid to leave the place for fear they turn my negroes out of Gaol and if they should and no person to take charge of them we should lose them of course."

The range of topics covered in the letter to Anderson, the always-contentious nature of his business relationships, and Jackson's metamorphosis from negro speculator to local warlord to U.S. president were not coincidental, but rather part of a consistent cycle of ambition, hubristic failure, and retrenchment. In the words of political scientist Michael Paul Rogin, "Jackson...won and lost land in horse races, mixed slave trading with land deals, and was plagued like other speculators by problems of tax liens, imperfect title, Indian claims, and bankruptcy. Other speculators lived with these problems and sought to resolve them pragmatically. They had turned virgin land into money; they remained in the material realm in the conflicts that resulted. Jackson, however, did not. His personality and the threat to his fortune forced him to return to the nature of things. Worldly success failed to rescue Jackson...and establish his authority in the world...Plagued by title conflicts and insecure possession, he went back to the Indians, at the beginning of it all."

== Slave trading, 1810–1812 ==
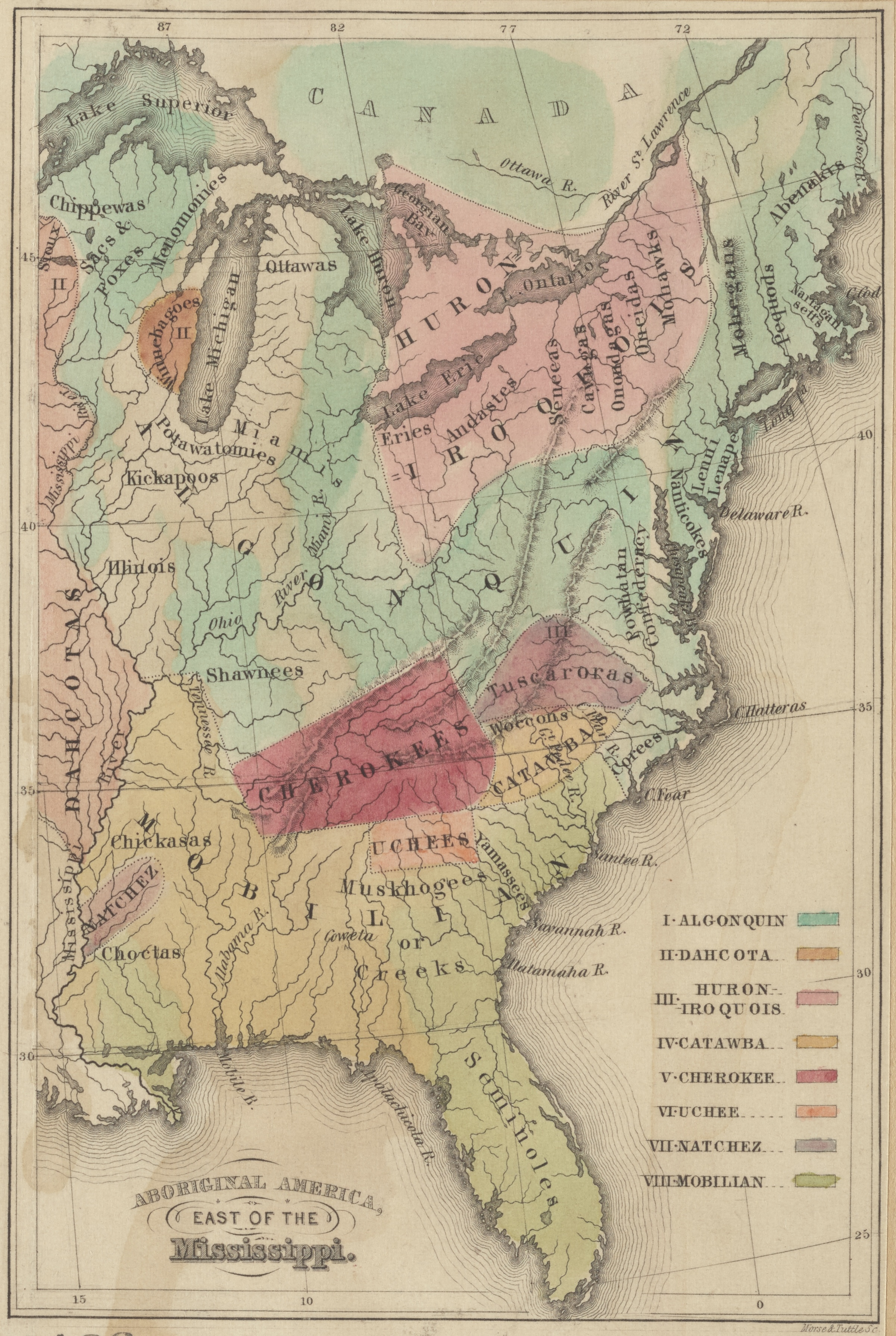
"Aboriginal America east of the Mississippi" by Moses & Tuttle, 1840, showing homelands of the Natchez, Choctaw, Chickasaw, Muscogee, Cherokee, and Seminole peoples (New York Public Library b20643866)

In November 1810, nephew Donelson Caffery wrote Jackson from Natchez with reports on his business activity, "especially slave trade." Caffery recounted that "I should not have given you such a respite from reading my letters had I not expected Cousin Jack Hutchings for some time, by whom I should have had the pleasure of hearing you but he has not yet got this far...From the goods I have sold we shall have command of a fund of about $4500." The dispensation of these funds was yet undetermined by Caffery and his partners Isaac Baker and "Mr. W. J." but Caffery wanted to use it for "for Baxter to go on to Maryland to buy Negroes...we can obtain a loan of $4000...[to] buy Negroes & send them down." Jackson himself was similarly occupied. In 1810, Jackson, Joseph Coleman (the first mayor of Nashville), and a "probable" resident of Natchez named Horace Green formed a business partnership on the existing system of transporting trade goods, slaves, etc. downriver from Tennessee to the consumers of Louisiana and Mississippi. (Note: Horace Green has not been conclusively identified, but John Spencer Bassett believed he was likely a "young relative" of Rachel Jackson. The firm name is usually rendered Green but in some cases the person appears to have signed his name Greene with an E.) Slaves owned by this firm became part of the propaganda leafleting and news coverage of Jackson's business dealings during the bitter 1828 campaign. The slaves that came into the joint ownership of Jackson, Coleman, and Green were bought from a Mecklenburg County, Virginia, tavern owner named Richard Epperson. Per historian Snow, "In essence, the men only paid a down payment of $2,500 on a total agreed price of $10,500 in cash. The rest of the principal was to be paid in two six-month installments. However, when Green...subsequently abandoned the slaves in Natchez, Jackson became entirely responsible for both the debt and the costs of transporting the slaves back to Davidson County." The letters collected by Andrew Erwin in 1828 and published under the title Gen. Jackson's Negro Speculations were largely concerned with this particular slave-trading contract, which one letter summarized as the "dispute between [Jackson] and Epperson, which was referred to the arbitration of Judge Haywood and Judge Overton", and, continuing, stated that among the enslaved people assembled was "a negro fellow [Jackson] bought for the express purpose of selling to Kenner and Henderson at New Orleans, expecting to obtain for him the enormous sum of US$2,000 (equivalent to $38,700 in 2025), provided [Jackson] could procure the certificate of D. Moore, and others, as to his being a good blacksmith."

According to a political opponent writing as "Philo-Tennesseean", other enslaved people that Jackson collected immediately prior to the outbreak of the War of 1812 were gleaned from a $4,000 (equivalent to $77,400 in 2025) horse-race bet lost by Newton Cannon, later a governor of Tennessee. Cannon paid up in cash, a horse, and 11 slaves, which collectively represented "the earnings of many years honest labor."

The Port Gibson Correspondent newspaper published an "extra" edition on September 13, 1828, addressing the subject of Jackson's work as a slave trader and giving a detailed description of Jackson's 1811 slave shipment to Natchez. The Port Gibson coverage was reprinted in Peter Force's National Journal, which was "the official organ of the John Quincy Adams administration."

"We have, with astonishment, observed the attempt in Nashville to brow-beat and bully the most respectable gentlemen from asserting publicly what is the absolute truth: that Gen. Andrew Jackson was, in the year 1811, a dealer in Negroes: and, believing it to be our duty to expose falsehoods and to aid the truth, we do now assure all men, whether the friends or the opponents of Gen. Jackson, far and near: That in the fall of the year 1811, Gen. Jackson and John Hutchings did descend the river Mississippi and land at Bruinsburg at the mouth of the Bayou Pierre in this county, with from twenty to thirty negroes: that a number of those negroes were brought to this immediate neighborhood, and afterwards encamped for weeks at Mr. Moore's in the McCaleb settlement, ten miles from this town; that on the 27th of December, 1811, Gen. Jackson sold three negroes, "a woman named Kissiah, with her two children, Reuben, about three years old, and a female child at the breast called Elsay, in and for consideration of the sum of $650."—that on the 28th of Dec. 1811, the very day after the former sale, and while at the same encampment, he sold to Mr. James McCaleb, of this county, two other negroes, named Candis and Lucinda, for the sum of $1000:—that he sold other negroes in this county during that trip;—that he sold some at or in the neighborhood of Bayou Sarah;—that after the belief became general in this country that war would be declared against Great Britain, the planters were indisposed to buy negroes, as the market for their cotton would be closed, Gen. Jackson resolved to return to Tennessee, with the remnant of his drove; that while he had his negroes encamped near Mr. James McCaleb's, and was making his preparations to pass through the Indian nation, he was informed by one of the most respectable citizens of this county, now living in it, of the law requiring passports for slaves; of the resolute character of Mr. Dinsmore, and of his punctilious execution of the duties of his office as Indian Agent: These things we do most unequivocally and unhesitatingly charge and assert. We do so on the best of authority,—the notoriety of the facts; the declarations gentlemen of whose truth no doubt can or will be entertained; from written documents, of various kinds, in the hand writing of Gen. Jackson himself: as also from the affidavit of Mr. William Miller of this county, who came down on board the boat with Gen. Jackson and his negroes; all of which we have heard and read. These things Gen. Jackson cannot, dare not, and will not, himself deny; whatever he may suffer others to do." (Note: "Mr. Moore's...ten miles from this town" has not been conclusively identified. The landmark House on Ellicott's Hill was built for merchant James Moore one block inland from the Natchez bluffs c. 1800. The postmaster of Port Gibson, Mississippi Territory in 1806 was a Dr. Moore. There was a James Moore hired to construct 14 "negro cabins" on "Bruensburg plantation" in 1825. Winthrop University in South Carolina holds some letters written by James Moore to his brother-in-law, telling about their family life, political happenings, and the slavery-based plantation economy in Natchez.) (Note: The affidavit of William Miller has not been found, and his identity is unclear, but this may be the William Miller whom Winthrop Sargent appointed in 1799 to be a justice of the peace for Adams County, Mississippi Territory, to serve alongside Philander Smith. Also, a man named William Miller wrote territorial governor Claiborne in 1803 from "Byau Piere" about horses brought in from the "Chactaw Nation." There is also the William Miller (March 15, 1761 – May 6, 1846) who was a key figure in the Whiskey Rebellion in Pennsylvania. He fled to the Northwest Territory to avoid arrest. Pardoned by George Washington in 1797, Miller moved to Spanish Louisiana where he worked as a trader and land speculator in partnership with fellow pardoned insurrectionist Alexander Fulton.)

According to "Sidney" in the Natchez Ariel, the slaves Jackson sold in late 1811 were "landed in chains at the Petit Gulf, in Claiborne county; as far as I can learn about a dozen were sold in that county...Not finding purchasers for more in Claiborne county, Gen. Jackson brought the remainder down to Washington [the territorial capital, located in Adams County] and then to Natchez, where he exhibited them for sale, and the General was notoriously considered at that day as nothing more than a negro trader. About two years after it is thought by many that he took his degrees which qualify him for the presidency—'there indeed was a rise.'" That Petit Gulf and Natchez were slave-trading centers is affirmed by the memoir of William Wells Brown, who wrote about visiting Natchez and Rodney (renamed from Petit Gulf in 1828) when he was the teenaged servant of a Missouri-based slave trader: "We landed at Rodney and the slaves were driven to the pen in the back part of the village. Several were sold at this place, during our stay of four or five days, when we proceeded on to Natchez. There we landed at night, and the gang was put in the warehouse until morning, when they were driven to the pen. As soon as the slaves are put in the pens, swarms of planters may be seen in and about them. They knew when Walker was expected, as he always had the time advertised beforehand when he would be in Rodney, Natchez, and New Orleans."

=== Andrew Jackson versus Silas Dinsmoor ===
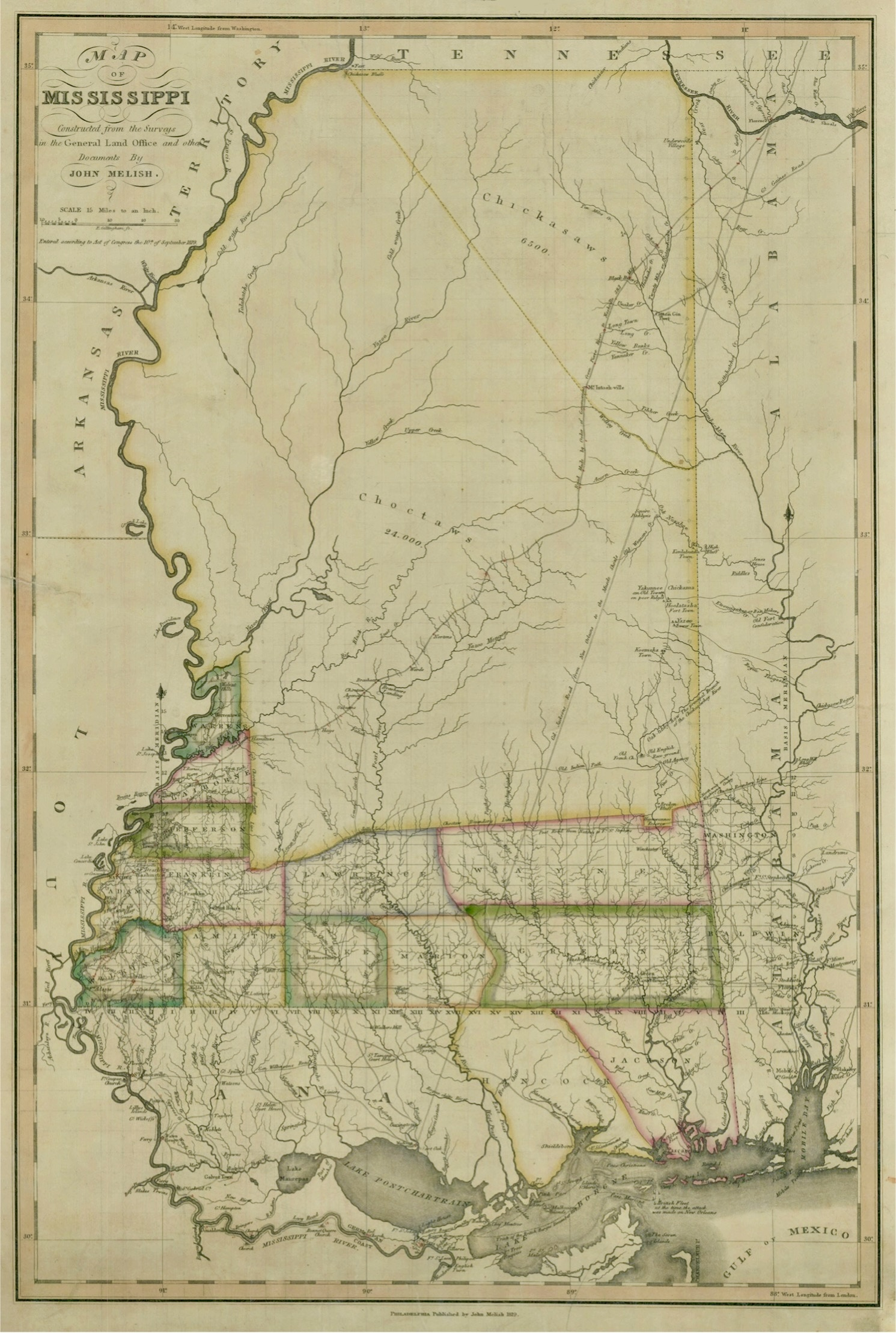
The Choctaw Agency near Brashears' Landing at the intersection of the Trace and General Carroll's Road is where Jackson was irate at the prospect of having his passport(s) checked while he transporting a group of slaves back to the Hermitage (John Melish, 1819, NAID 78116869)

While returning to Nashville with his unsold stock, Jackson got into a dispute with a United States Indian agent named Silas Dinsmoor. (Note: Dismoor's name is often spelled Dismore, even in otherwise reliable sources, but per Dismoor himself, this is "misnaming" him. The spelling Dismore is retained in primary sources.) Dismoor was determined to enforce a regulation requiring that every enslaved person crossing through the unceded Choctaw lands carry a document identifying their legal owner and the purpose of their travel. The intention was to prevent runaway slaves from using the Choctaw lands as a refuge, which in turn would hopefully reduce complaints from White American settlers about the Choctaw. Jackson disliked Dinsmoor enforcing this rule, and while traveling, had to pass the Choctaw Agency in company of a "considerable number of slaves." Dinsmoor was not at the agency when Jackson passed by, and "much to my gratification and disappointment I was very politely treated by Mr. Smith Deputy Agent." Still, Jackson left a message promising a future confrontation with Dinsmoor, and later sent a letter to a U.S. Senator demanding Dismoor's removal and threatening that "the wrath and indignation of our citizens will...involve Silas Dinsmore in the flames of his agency house." (In 1828, J. Q. Adams mentioned the publication of this letter in his journal, seemingly not realizing that Jackson himself was the blockaded "negro trader.") In September 1812, John Gordon, ferry and stand operator, who "may have served as the agent for other persons, such as Andrew Jackson", provided an affidavit about his experience being stopped for a passport while traveling with two "servants." Per Gordon's account, Dismoor "appeared astonished that I should have come through without one" and "he then took an obligation of me to give him from some proper person a certificate of the rite of property and gave me a passport to proceed." This affidavit came into the possession of Jackson, which suggested to historian Douglas Edward Leach "that Gordon and Jackson may have had business relationships at this time." Dismoor persisted in regulating the passage of enslaved people over the Trace, and in a display of his characteristic vindictiveness, Jackson eventually succeeded in getting Dismoor fired from his job.

Jackson, affronted that the "threatening a federal agent" issue was being resurfaced in 1828, wrote, "Did I not inform you that the Sub agent Smith (Dinsmore not being there) had collected about 400 armed Indians with about sixty white men, to stop or destroy me, if I attempted to pass the agency without exhibitting a passport...that the demand was an act of usurpation...I was determined to exercise this right, and resist & put down, at the risque of my life, this petty usurper..." (Curiously, in a letter that he written 16 years earlier, in 1812, Jackson did not describe 460 men lying in wait, but rather stated, "there were at least 20 men summoned, and attending, with four Choctaws.") According to accounts from Jackson's political opponents, "It is notorious that he did not take a passport, but when he approached the Agency he armed his negroes with axes, hired some half breed Indians with their arms—marched by the Agency in military order, himself at the head, with the cap of his holsters thrown back, and his rifle cocked." The slaves Jackson was trafficking, one of whom was named John Amp, were collectively armed with two axes and six clubs.

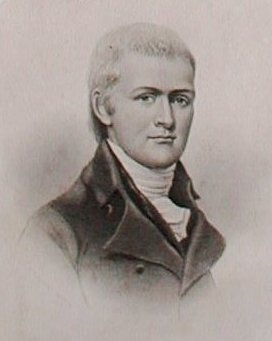
Silas Dinsmoor was a slave owner. He is also remembered as a man of courage and character, especially in his dealings with the Choctaw. (Photo: Dinsmore Homestead)

Jackson's ire seemed to stand out, even on a frontier road regularly traveled by hardened boatmen, quarrelsome Kaintucks, horse-stealing Indians, gangs of homicidal highwaymen, and bounty hunters seeking the heads of fugitive slaves. Historian J. M. Opal found "no evidence of any general uproar against the Indian agent. Indeed, the very existence of so many passports suggests a rough consensus between most settlers and a Jeffersonian regime eager to oblige them." A retired American military officer, Alexander McIlhenny of Frederick County, Maryland, who had been stationed at Washington Cantonment in Mississippi Territory during the War of 1812, said as much in a letter to the newspaper in 1828: "...the general, having sent forward his negroes, had mounted his horse, and laying his hand upon his pistols, significantly replied, 'These are General Jackson's passports!!!' I have often thought of this anecdote of Mr. Dinsmore's whenever the Constitution, laws, or the orders of government, have thwarted the arbitrary will of this man. Shall weapons of war be his passport to our suffrage, and to the Chair of State?"

=== The land uneasy: Jackson's side of the story ===
There are three contemporaneous letters written by the then-44-year-old Jackson about this specific platoon of slaves. Nearly all surviving letters written by participants in the American slave trade are marked by "insensitivity, self-congratulation, and deeply racist complacency."

Jackson wrote in 1828 of this much-disputed coffle that "it was said, [Green] was squandering it, by card playing." Jackson wrote in 1812 that there were 27 people in the group: "...25 grown negroes; with two sucking children they always count with the mother." He noted that 13 were girls or women, as they needed "habits."

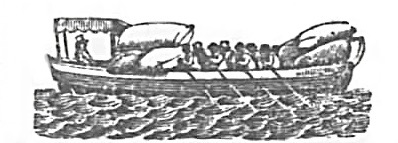
In 1829, the Huntsville Democrat used this icon for "cotton boats" and "cotton freighting" advertisements placed by Tennessee River shipping companies; in an 1804 letter about his firm's shipping, Jackson wrote, "My chairs and settee I wish brought up they can be lashed on top the goods, a cord for this purpose you will find in the boat..."

In the first letter, dated December 17, 1811, perhaps written as the fading Great Comet of 1811 lingered overhead during the last days of what was called the wonder year of the West, Jackson wrote his wife "on tomorrow I shall set out from here homewards, on the Biopierre I expect to be detained Some days preparing the negroes for the wilderness My trusty friend John Hutchings, on the recpt of my letter had come down to this place recd. all the negroes on hand and had carried them up to his farm—I have Just seen Mr. [Horace] Green last evening this morning he was to have Seen me, but as yet, he has not appeared as to the State of the business I can give you no account—untill I have a Settlement with him or have an account of the appropriation of the amount of sales from him I shall bring home with me from twelve to Twenty—I hope to be able to sell some of them on the way at good prices—but many of them I Shall be obliged to bring home and as most of that number will be females I leave you to point out to Mr John Fields [Hermitage overseer] where to have the house built for them." Ten days later, he found a buyer for the mother and children, Kessiah, Ruben, and Elsey. The day after that he sold Candis and Lucinda.

On February 8, 1812, Jackson wrote to his sister-in-law Mary Donelson Caffery: "The negro fellows that I brought thro with me owing to their exposure in the wilderness have all been sick and were the well neither of them is such that I could recommend to you—nor could I think of selling such to you..." He also advised her that the "convulsed state of the Earth and water from the frequent shocks" of the 1811–1812 New Madrid earthquakes had disrupted river traffic to such an extent that she would be better off buying someone already down south.

Then, in correspondence of February 29, 1812, he made time for a multi-page complaint about the business acumen of young Horace Green. Jackson wrote that "...the highest Expence of any that did accrue during the time we were engaged in the mercantile transactions was (including provissions hands and return expence)" was $250, whereas Green had spent $318.75. Jackson continued, "I also found from examining the acpts of Negroes sent to markett that the expence never averaged more from here than fifteen dollars a head", with the solitary exception of "one wench and three children, who had been subject to the fits remained better than six months in the Natchez" having cost him $25. Jackson argued to the arbitrators to whom he was writing that Green's business expenses were "exorbitant" and that Green did not even provide an itemized report, but rather lumped "charges without any specification." Jackson continued that "taking no notice of the time the negroes have been hired out, or the reduction of their expence by sales, and one having run away" there was a balance of $340 but "from every enquiry I have made on the subject, that fifteen dollars pr head is about the usual expence, and finding this to amount including the amount of the Price of the Boat, and not taking into view the children at the breast, it makes the cost on each negro $44.66,2/3" which per Jackson was "more than double what is usual..."

Jackson proceeded to lay out a list of expected expenses for such a slaving expedition, based on "the soldiers ration", including the anticipated cost of crewing the boat (with a steersman), housing for Mr. Green "after he left his Boat", two purchases of cornmeal (totaling 100 bushels) for $62.75, two purchases of bacon for $208.12 1/2, as well as an expected clothing expense for at least the female slaves: "one habit each the fellows recd naked." Jackson reported no expenditure to clothe the men or boys. The standard diet for slaves on the march was pork and cornmeal, but, per Mississippi historian Charles S. Sydnor, "as there was no economy in providing new clothes for the journey through the forests, negroes generally reached the market in rags."

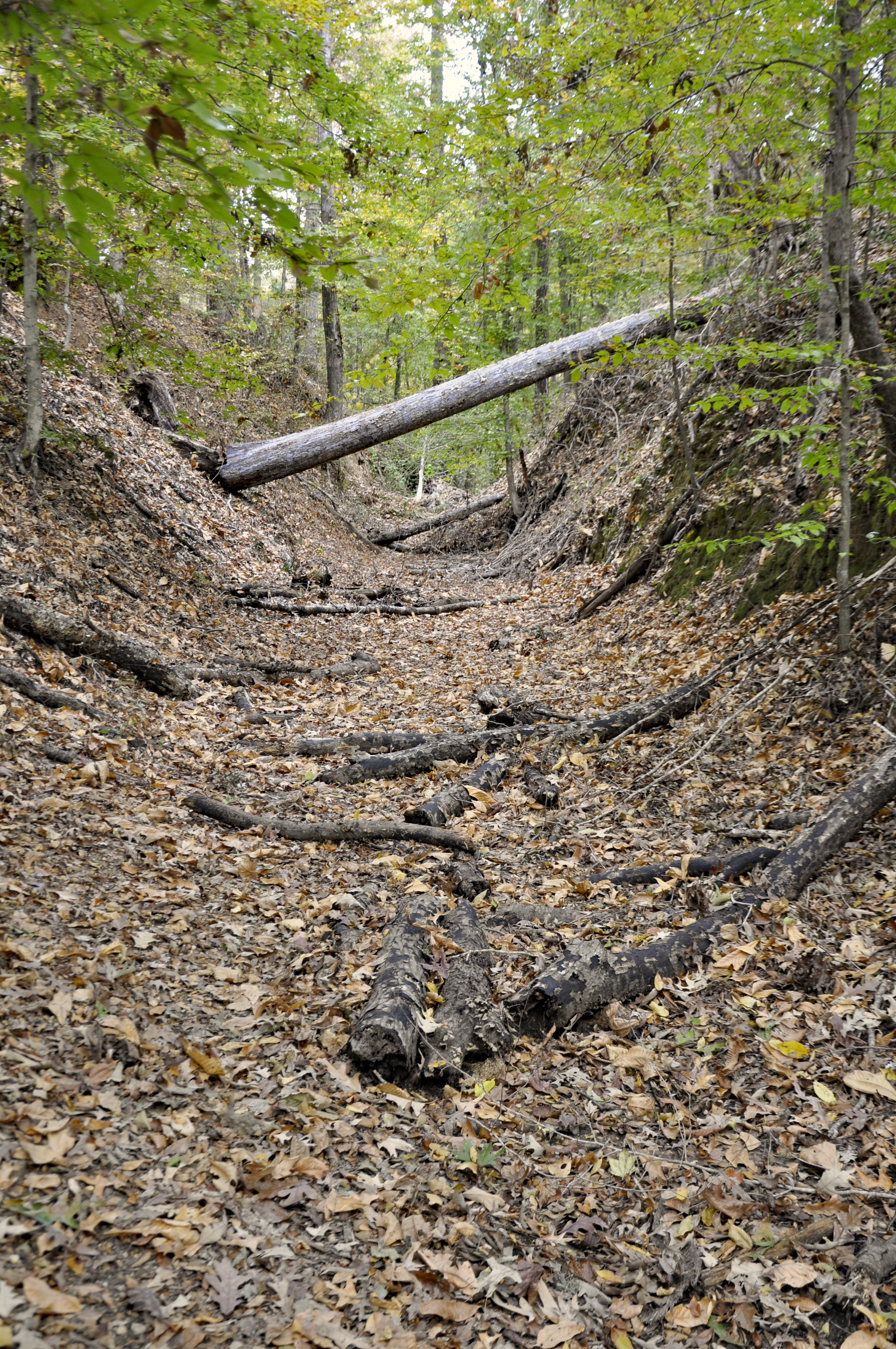
Enslaved people accompanying Jackson or partners back to Nashville from Natchez would have been walked through the Sunken Trace near Port Gibson, in chained packs called coffles, platoons, or droves. Male slaves were usually chained together, women with babies and young children might be transported on ox-drawn wagons. (Photo: Indies1, 2014)

They had hired a keelboat, and Green "had on board a number of Negroes" who could be put to work pulling the oars. An oar-propelled keelboat was better for going upstream than a flatboat, which essentially treated the Mississippi as one long flume ride. Jackson argued that if Green had sense he never would have made a sales call at Natchez, which everyone knew was "glutted" with slaves and slave traders, but instead he should have visited the prosperous old settlement of Bayou Sara (further downriver near Baton Rouge) and then gone up into the Red River country of Louisiana and sought buyers there. This type of circuit was the life of a slave trader, most of whom "seem to have stayed only a short while in any one place." Green instead landed at Natchez where he traded some of the slaves in his possession for what Jackson called "an old horse foundered." If Green had been a better steward of this merchandise, wrote Jackson, the slaves in question "would have cleared their own expence, if not neated something to the owners."

== Slave trading, 1813–1815 ==
In 1812, the state capital of Tennessee was relocated from Knoxville to Nashville, which had a population of about 1,000. In the acts of 1812, the Tennessee state legislature prohibited importation of slaves as merchandise; it remained legal to import slaves "acquired by descent, devise, marriage, or purchase." The prohibition act authorized the seizure and sale of slaves at auction if the legal owner had not provided an inventory and oath of lawful ownership to the local justice of the peace within 20 days of settlement.

Battlefields of the Creek War, a subconflict of the War of 1812 (Mapped by U.S. Army Center for Military History, 2014)

On June 7, 1814, in the midst of the Creek War, seven people were sold at auction in Nashville. All are believed to have been slaves of Creek village headman Bob Cataula, who had surrendered the Muscogee tribal town of Littafuchee at the request of Jackson's army on October 27, 1813. There were three men in the auction lot, one of whom was named Cato. Cato was married to an enslaved woman who was at least one-quarter Choctaw by heritage and who had been purchased by Cataula for $300. Cato's wife had three children. By order of General Jackson, proceeds from the auction were supposed "to be equally divided between the heirs of those who were killed or died of their wounds and those men who became disabled" during the war. At least one Tennessean inquired publicly if it was right to sell Cato's wife and children: "I want to know by what authority a poor captive Choctaw squaw and her several children for many years confined to slavery in the Creek nation, and taken at Talleshatchee by the whites, has been sold as slaves? I know not what principles govern in these cases—but I imagine it cannot be right to make slaves of Indians. At least my feelings revolt at the idea of such a step." Littafuchee had also been the home of a baby the Jacksons called Theodore, who was separated from his biological mother and sent to live at the Hermitage as a "little Indian" for their five-year-old son Andrew Jackson Jr. Later, after the destruction of the Red Stick army at Tohopeka, displaced Black refugees began to arrive at Fort Jackson. In some cases their legal owners had been killed at Fort Mims; the buying and selling necessary to resettle these slaves continued for years, and Jackson took the opportunity to buy five people (Amey, Hannah, Jack, Sam, and Seller) from the son-in-law of a man killed at Fort Mims. Jackson sent several others to his forced-labor farm in Tennessee, "where they were put to work" until they were reclaimed in 1816 and 1818.

== Other accounts of Jackson in Mississippi ==
=== Free Trader (1841) ===
On October 15, 1841, the Mississippi Free Trader newspaper of Natchez, edited by T. A. S. Doniphan and J. F. H. Claiborne (earlier a Representative to the 25th United States Congress, later a regional historian) responded to an assertion that the slave trade was conducted by "desperate, dangerous, and tyrannical men," listing Jackson as one of the honorable gents who had been known to engage in the business. Jackson was at this time 74 years old, still mostly alive, and had been feted in Natchez the January prior, at a celebration of the 25th anniversary of the Battle of New Orleans.

These desperate fellows conduct themselves very peaceably, here, and seem to be great favorites any how. We have seen Col. Bingaman arm in arm, an hundred times, with an old trader, Eli Odom; and we know a certain Isaac Franklin, John L. Harris, Thomas Rowan, Gen. Woolfolk of the Georgia Senate, to say nothing of others, that are recognized here and elsewhere, as gentlemen of the first water. We know a certain Rice Ballard, whose associates, in Virginia, are equal to any man's, and there is also one John Armfield, whose splendid mansion in Alexandria, with its refined hospitalities, is the resort of the most distinguished public men at Washington. A desperate set of ruffians these, with old Andrew Jackson at their head!

=== Account of Idler (1854) ===
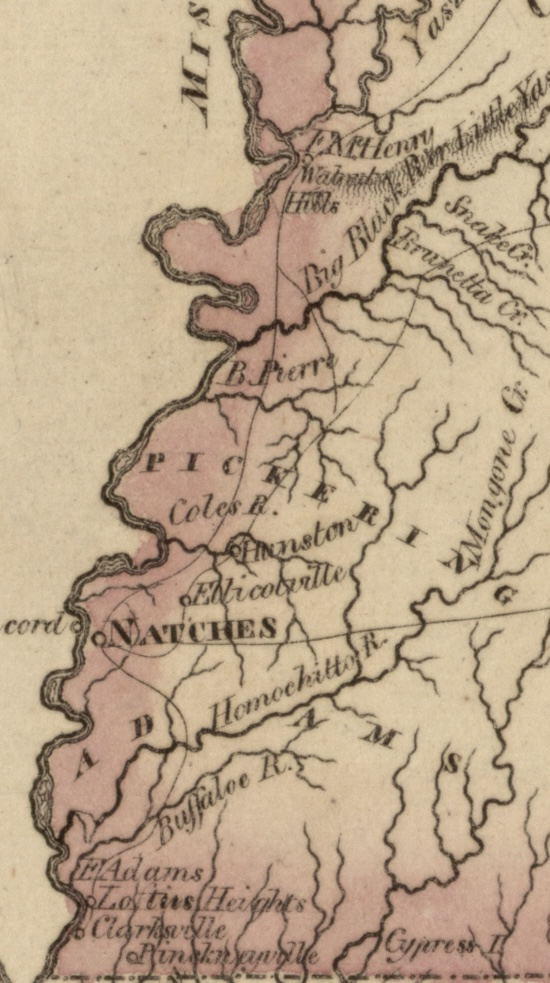
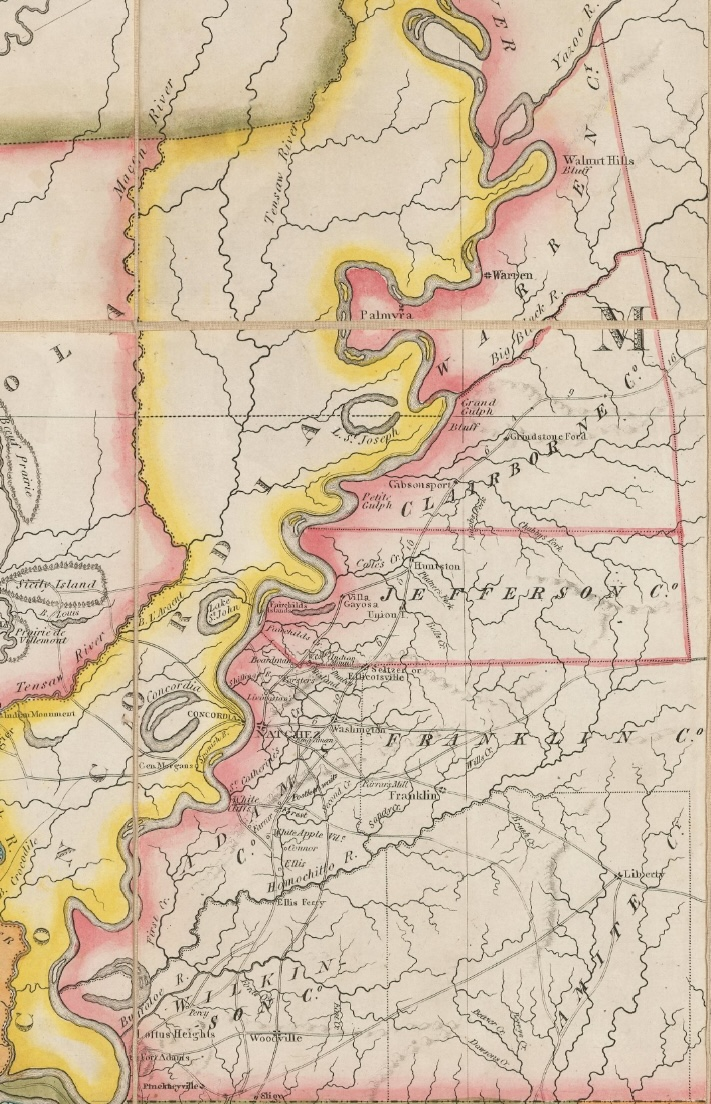
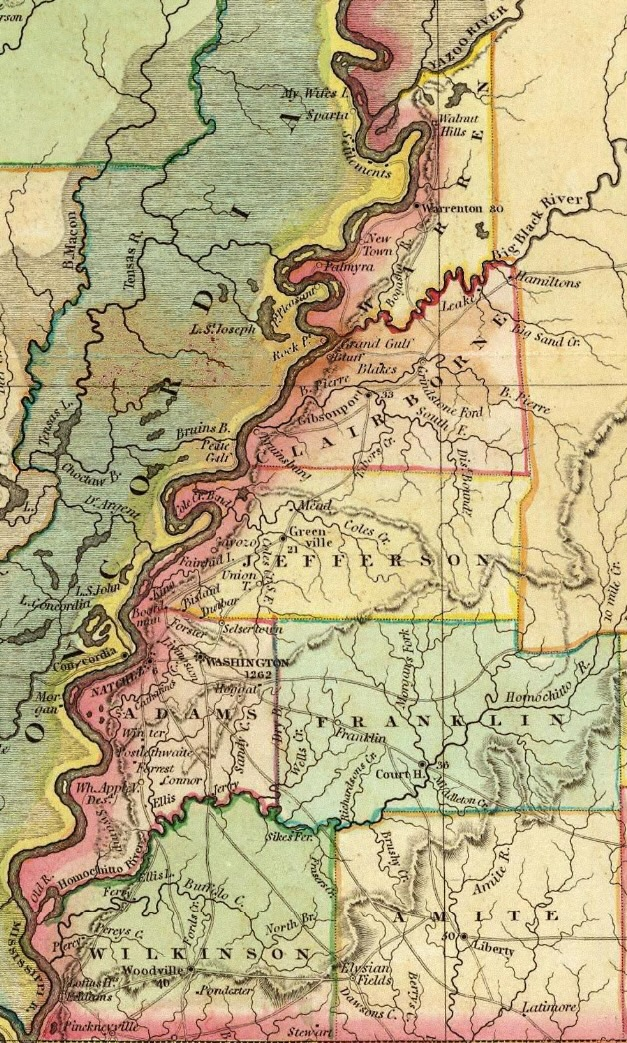
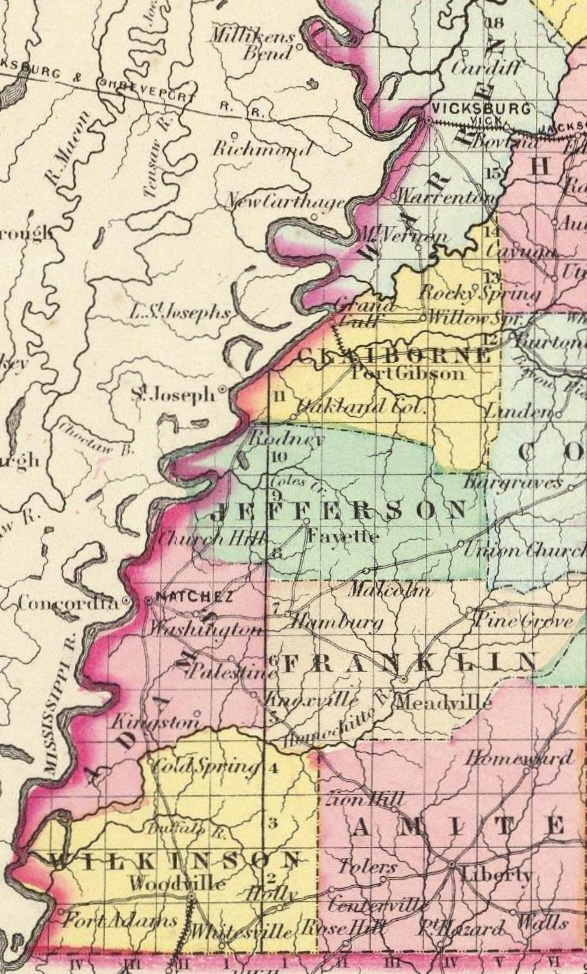
Top left: Natchez District, Mississippi Territory c. 1800, showing "Fort McHenry", Fort Adams, the very first subdivisions, Adams and Pickering counties, and the towns of Ellicotville (later Selsertown), and Huntston (later Old Greenville); top right: Natchez District c. 1816, showing mileage between stands on the Natchez Trace, "Gibsonsport" (later Port Gibson) and the Grindstone Ford; bottom left: Natchez District c. 1823 in the last days of the Trace as a U.S. government post road; bottom right: the Natchez District c. 1856, showing railroad lines, and Louisiana towns on the opposite site of the Mississippi River

The first account of "Jackson as slave trader" that was published after his death comes from an author writing as Idler, datelined Rodney, Mississippi, 1854: "...here [at Bruinsburg], nearly fifty years ago, Gen. Jackson—he was not 'Old Hickory' then—landed his flatboat, laden with Western produce, negroes, etc., which he had piloted from Nashville. I have understood that the original intention of Jackson was to settle in Mississippi, but he subsequently returned through the wilderness to Tennessee..." Idler continued, explaining that "the removal of negroes through the Indian nation into one of the States of the Union was strictly prohibited", and there was a plan made by the Choctaw and their allies "to arrest him by force should he persist in his unlawful attempt" but Jackson "armed his negroes and a few of his friends and boldly marched unmolested through the Indian territory." (Note: Idler was most likely Dr. W. H. Watkins, Asa Watkins, or John A. Watkins (December 3, 1808 – August 27, 1898), the last of whom was a native of Jefferson County, Mississippi, who worked as a merchant and town officer in Rodney as a young man. He later moved to New Orleans, where he served as a county assessor and city councilman, and "never ceased to be a correspondent of several newspapers in various parts of the United States." He also wrote articles about the Choctaw people for The American Antiquarian and Oriental Journal. His recollections of the Creek War were republished as "Idler" in the Times-Picayune in 1886, in the Publications of the Mississippi Historical Society (volume IV), and in a small, incomplete collection of his writing called Some Interesting Facts of the Early History of Jefferson County, Mississippi. Watkins likely also published under the pseudonym "Opa" in the Fayette Chronicle of Fayette, Mississippi.) (Note: Under frontier conditions, it would not have been as transgressive as it later became for Jackson to have selectively "armed his negroes.")

"Idler" described Jackson participating in foot races and wrestling matches at Bruinsburg, naming "Bruin, Price, Crane, Freeland, Harmon and others" as Jackson's companions in sport. Jackson's most astute 19th-century biographer reported that as a youth, "He was passionately fond of those sports which are mimic battles; above all, wrestling...He was exceedingly fond of running foot-races, of leaping the bar, and jumping; and in such sports he was excelled by no one of his years." Among those taking an oath of allegiance to the United States, on October 30, 1798, were Waterman Crane, Llewellyn Price, and James and Hezekiah Harmon. These men swore their oath before Samuel Gibson, a resident since 1788 and the founder of Port Gibson, the principal village of upper Bayou Pierre. A surviving letter written to Jackson on October 21, 1791, by George Cochran, mentions "many agreeable hours" spent at Jackson's "friendly retreat at Bayou Pierre." In 1801, Cochran bought land on Bayou Pierre from Crane, property that was adjacent to land owned by territorial judge Bruin, and George Humphreys, father of future Confederate general Humphreys. When the Confederate general's grandfather died, back in the day, he owed money to "many creditors, including Jackson." One of the Humphreys' properties was called the Hermitage, a name that supposedly inspired the name of the Tennessee plantation Andrew Jackson established in 1804. In 1802 Cochran was involved in the operation of Bruin's saw mill, "now cutting cypress planks", located on James' Run stream near Bruinsburg and Bayou Pierre. The same year, Bruin and Cochran advertised that they were seeking investors for a planned 11-street town at Bruinsburg.

=== Account of Robinson (1858) ===
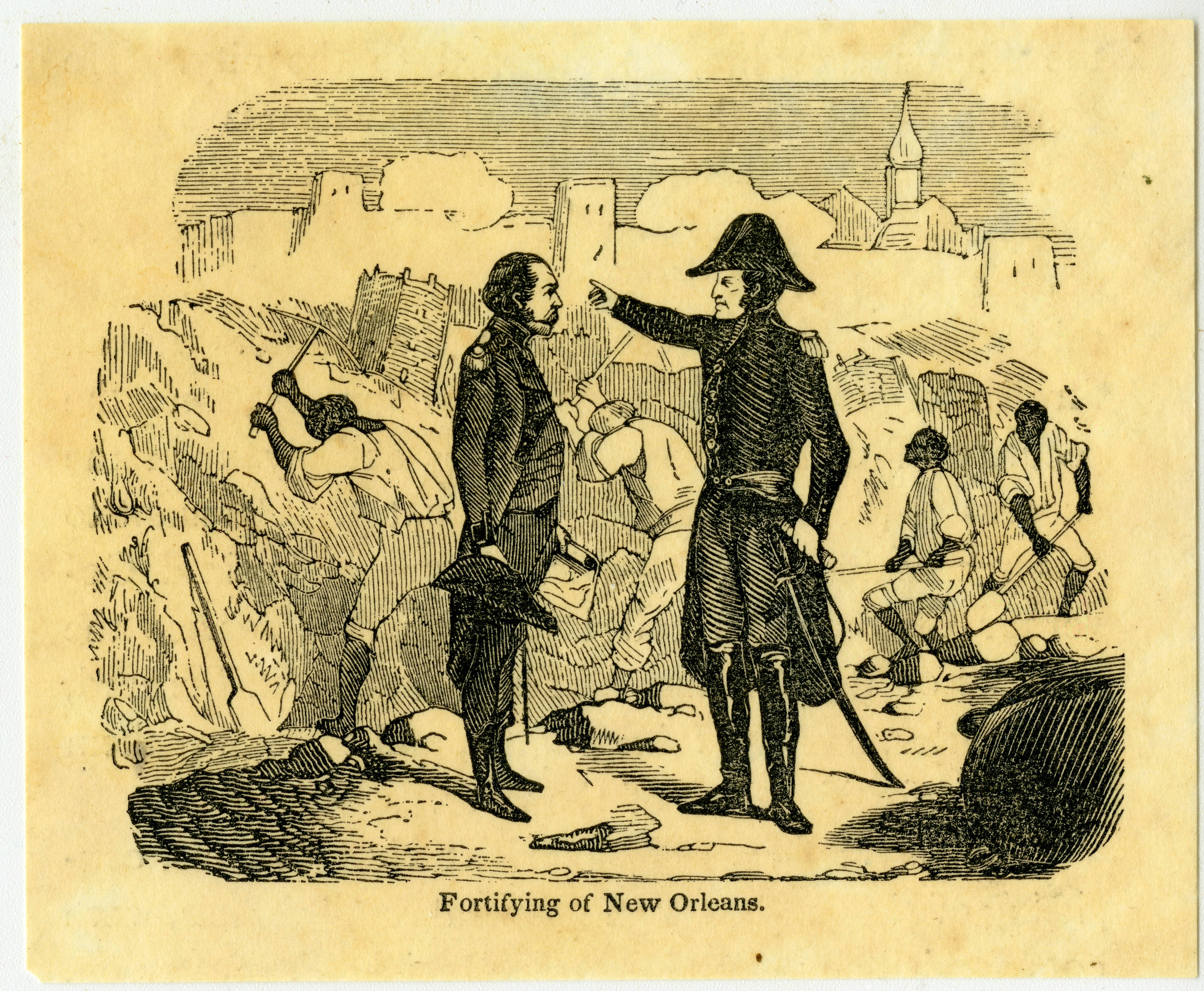
Jackson used soldiers, civilians, and hundreds of slaves to construct what became known as Line Jackson at New Orleans. Enslaved men dug trenches, fortified breastworks, and assembled the batteries that allowed the city to defend itself against British invasion (William Croome, "Fortifying of New Orleans", Pictorial Life of Andrew Jackson, 1848, TSLA 28062)

According to the slave narrative of James Robinson, published in 1858, when Andrew Jackson needed more men in the lead-up to what became the Battle of New Orleans, he visited the plantation of Calvin Smith near Natchez in approximately December 1814. (During the first week of December 1814 Jackson asked the Louisiana state legislature to "urge planters to lend their slaves to help raise earthworks to defend the river." Louisiana governor W. C. C. Claiborne backed Jackson, and the legislature approved the resolution.) Smith gave Jackson permission to take a large number of his slaves, and suggested more slaves could be gotten from Springfield. Thomas Hinds, one of the American military heroes of the War of 1812 in the southwestern theater, was helpfully married to a daughter of Springfield. Jackson had kinship ties to the Green family that connected him to what was called the Natchez Junto, the Green–Hinds–Hutchins–West political alliance in Mississippi Territory. (Thomas Green Jr.'s brother Abraham Green's mother-in-law and Andrew Jackson's wife were sisters.) Judge Bruin of Bruinsburg had worked with Calvin Smith's brother Philander Smith on territorial administrative and judicial issues, including the grand jury investigation of Aaron Burr's treason charges.

Jackson told the slaves on Smith's plantation that they would be given freedom in exchange for their work. According to Robinson, Smith was willing to part with his slaves because he could always buy new ones whereas if British forces captured the Mississippi River Delta his own children might be killed in the fighting. (There was, however, also a profit motive, as the masters were to be paid for the labor of the slaves that they lent to the war effort.) Jackson returned to New Orleans with the needed labor force. During the first week of January, as work strengthening earth-and-timber defensive lines continued near John Coffee's position, "some soldiers threatened mutiny over toiling on the entrenchments beside several hundred slaves, [although] Jackson managed to impress their officers with the value of the work, and no revolt took place." Historian Adam Rothman observed that the American capacity to "mobilize slave labor in defense of New Orleans counteracted to some degree the military disadvantages of plantation society." Jackson reneged, after the battle was won, and Robinson concluded his narrative with a warning to other American slaves: "Do not forget the promise Jackson made us in the New Orleans war—'If the battle is fought and victory gained on Israel's side, you shall all be free,' when at the same time he had made a bargain with our masters to return home again all that were not killed. Never will a better promise be made to our race on a similar occasion...Avoid being duped by the white man—he wants nothing to do with our race further than to subserve his own interest, in any thing under the sun."

=== Account of Sparks (1870) ===
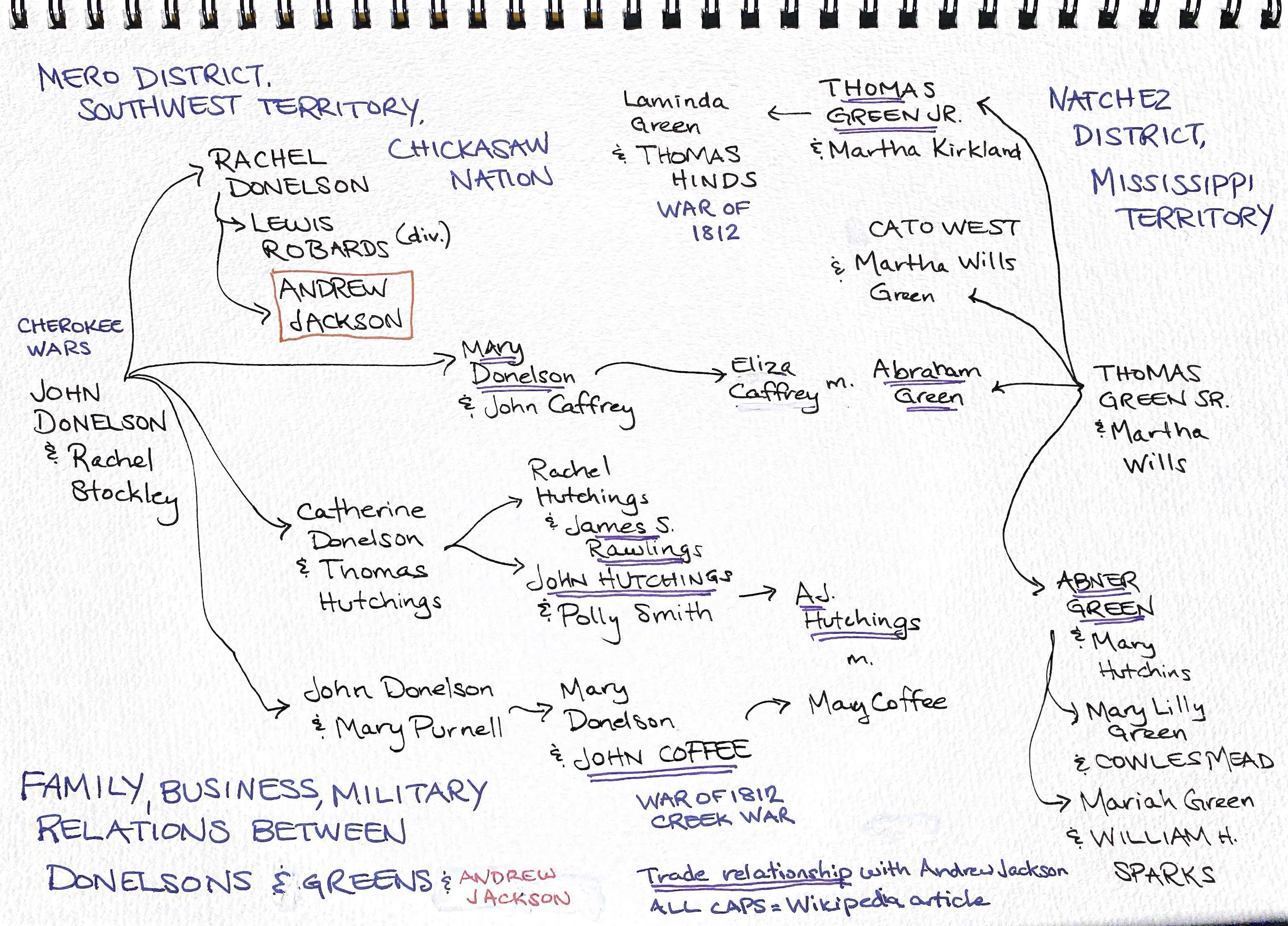
Andrew Jackson family ties to the Donelsons, showing relationship to his business partners John Hutchings and John Coffee, and relationship to the slave-buying Green family of Mississippi, and their kin, including Thomas Marston Green Jr., Abner Green, Thomas Hinds, and Cato West. (All-caps names have their own Wikipedia articles. Purple underline indicates trade relationship with Jackson. John Donelson and Thos. Green Sr. each fathered 10 or more children, not all are listed here.)

The memoirs of William Henry Sparks, published in 1870, described his knowledge of Jackson's slave-trading business: "Many will remember the charge brought against him pending his candidacy for the Presidency, of having been, in early life, a negro-trader, or dealer in slaves. This charge was strictly true, though abundantly disproved by the oaths of some, and even by the certificate of his principal partner." Sparks said that Jackson had a "small store, or trading establishment...which stood immediately upon the bank of the Mississippi" at Bruinsburg, and there was an accompanying race track and a cockfighting pit, and people told stories for years after about Jackson's "skill" at these sports. Per Sparks, Jackson sold slaves in the vicinity of Claiborne County, including to Sparks' father-in-law Abner Green and his wife's uncle Thomas M. Green Jr. Sparks claimed to have "bills of sale for negroes sold to Abner Green, in the handwriting of Jackson, bearing his signature..."

"Sometimes, when the price was better, or the sales were quicker, he carried them to Louisiana. This, however, he soon declined; because, under the [redhibition] laws of Louisiana, he was obliged to guarantee the health and character of the slaves he sold. On one occasion he sold an unsound negro to a planter in the parish of West Feliciana, and, upon his guarantee, was sued and held to bail to answer. In this case he was compelled to refund the purchase-money, with damages. He went back upon his partner, and compelled him to share the loss. This caused a breach between them, which was never healed. This is the only instance which ever came to my knowledge of strife with a partner. He was close to his interest, and spared no means to protect it."

Sparks also recalled that when he and his wife visited the White House in 1835, 67-year-old widower Jackson asked them, "'Is old papa Jack and Bellile living?'...These were two old Africans, faithful servants of her father; and then there was an anecdote of each of them—their remarks or their conduct upon some hunting or fishing excursion, in which he had participated 40 years before."

Writing in 1912, Thomas E. Watson commented, "The biographers of Andrew Jackson strain and strive mightily to ignore the fact that their hero was a negro trader in his early days, but it is a fact nevertheless...Ordinarily, the Memories of Fifty Years is to be rejected as an authority: the book was written in the extreme old age of the author and is full of fable. But William H. Sparks himself married into the Green family, (Note: Sparks married Mariah Amanda Green Carmichael, the last-born of Abner Green's offspring, in Natchez in 1827.) lived in the Bruinsburgh neighborhood, and must be presumed to have known what the Greens had to say concerning their great friend and his beloved wife."

It is very easy for those who have their fortunes secured in bank stock...or money at interest [to] deliberately proclaim a jubilee on our slaves, in which they have neither interest to lose nor danger to fear.

— William Smith, U.S. Senator and lifelong friend of Jackson, 1816

During a ride of 450 miles from Nashville, I had seen nothing in circulation but Tennessee bank notes (mixed occasionally with an Alabama note), down to the denomination of six and a quarter cents; and shin-plasters of all sorts and of all sizes, from a dollar downwards, and manufactured by all sorts of persons, from the wealthy merchant, to the market butcher and the petty shopkeeper. This latter generation sprang into being immediately on the stoppage of specie payments by the banks.

— Rev. Henry Ruffner, "Notes of a Tour from Virginia to Tennessee in the Months of July and August 1838"

[Jackson] was a bank hater from an early day. Paper money was an abomination to him, because he regarded it in the light of a promise to pay that was almost certain, sooner or later, to be broken.

— Felix Robertson, physician and son of Tennessee explorer James Robertson, quoted by Parton (1861)

=== Account of McCaleb (1915) ===
Dr. James F. McCaleb, writing about the Natchez Trace in the Natchez News-Democrat in 1915, (Note: James F. McCaleb (November 26, 1866 – July 25, 1943) was a plantation owner and physician who was educated at the University of Virginia and Tulane Medical School. A prolific writer and amateur historian, McCaleb regularly contributed articles to the Port Gibson Reveille, beginning in 1896.) described Jackson as a sportsman and gambler, stated that he had stores at both Bruinsburg and Old Greenville, and that: "Grindstone Ford lane, one mile in length, on the Natchez Trace was the great rendezvous for horse racing, the Indian ball game, and lacrosse. Travelers from Kentucky and Tennessee stopped at the station of Mrs. Worldridge and the tavern of George Lemon near the Grindstone Ford on Bayou Pierre to enjoy the regular Sunday festivals...Among the horsemen from the Blue Grass State was A. S. Colthrap, who ran his horse against General Jackson's betting four slaves to determine the winner as well as some money. Colthrap lost his horse, his money, and his slaves to General Jackson, returning home a poorer and a wiser man." Per historian and Jackson biographer Bassett, "Race paths were laid out in the earliest [Southern] settlements and succeeded by circular tracks, as the settlements developed." In a study of antebellum horse racing, the Journal of Mississippi History recounted the Jackson–Colthrap incident and stated that this straightaway was the first racecourse in Claiborne County and was located near the "Red House" tavern at Rocky Springs. Also, according to the memoir of a Presbyterian minister, Sunday was indeed race day in the vicinity of Old Greenville, an attraction that drew many young men away from church attendance. Neither report addressed whether Jackson kept his winnings for personal use or resold them for short-term gain. There is an E. S. Coltharp (1784–1859) buried at the old Rocky Springs Methodist Church cemetery on the historic road from Natchez to Nashville. This Dr. James H. McCaleb who wrote an article about the Natchez Trace for the Natchez News-Democrat in 1915 was a great-grandnephew of the James McCaleb (1772–1822) who purchased Malinda and Candis from Andrew Jackson in 1811.

== Charges, denials, coverup, historiography ==
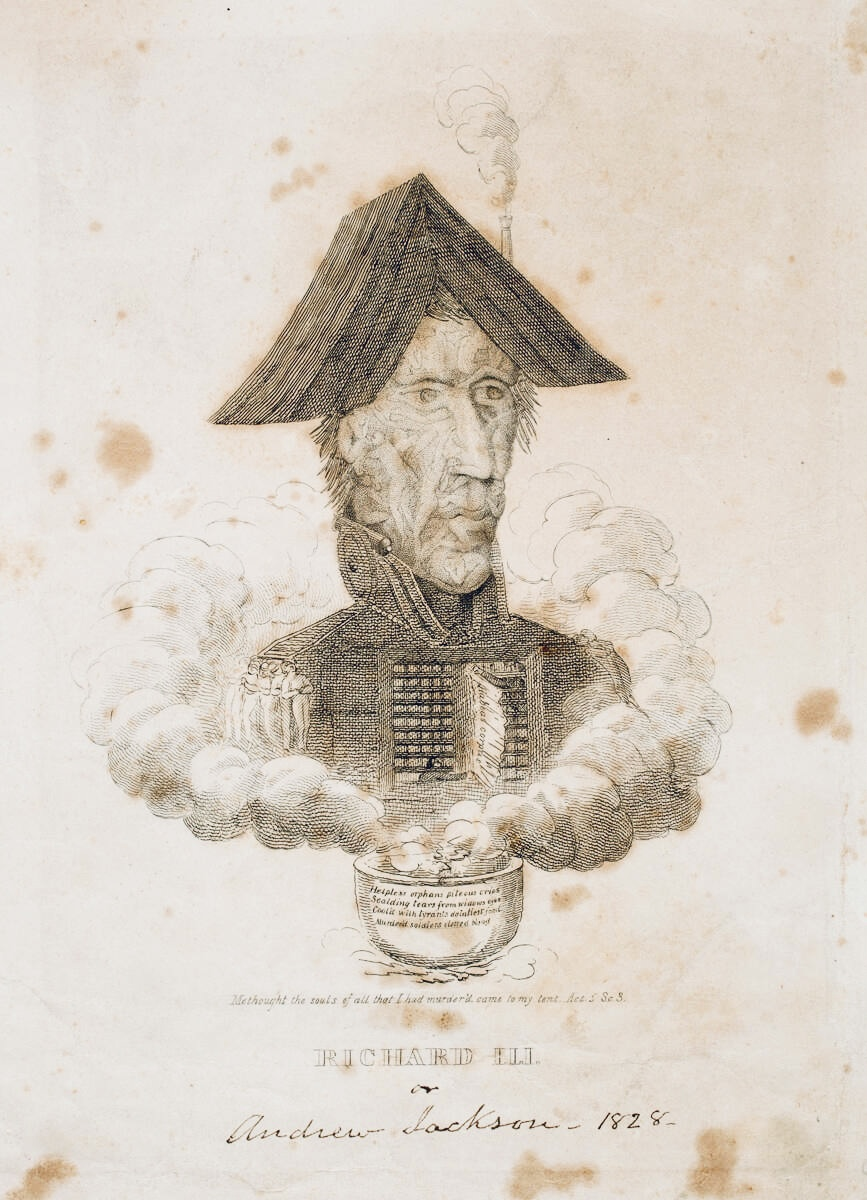
In this 1828 caricature of Jackson by David Claypoole Johnston, entitled Richard III, the epaulette fringe is made from the bodies of people Jackson had hanged (for instance, Arbuthnot, Ambrister, Homathlemico, and Francis the Prophet), and the details of his face are constructed from the naked bodies of dead Indians. The caption is a quotation from Shakespeare's text: "Me thought the souls of all that I had murder'd came to my tent." Jackson antagonists leaned heavily on comparisons to Richard, with a Pennsylvania Whig columnist editorializing in 1832, "The tyrant Richard the 3d murdered children—babes—to reach the throne but you assassinate the rights, and murder the happiness and freedom of whole generations of children unborn! What blood you may cause to be shed, in your wanton and daring career of ambition, will depend on the virtue, and the patience, or the miscreant conduct and servile spirit of the people." (Charles E. Goodspeed Collection, Worcester Art Museum 1910.48.1589)

American abolitionist Benjamin Lundy covered reports of Jackson's slave trading in his newspaper, The Genius of Universal Emancipation, or American Anti-Slavery Journal and Register of News. In 1827, when the first allegation appeared in Kentucky, Lundy recounted a separate story about Jackson having whipped a recaptured runaway slave he had tied to the joist of a blacksmith shop. Lundy could not confirm the secondhand report, and expressed hope that the reports of slave trading were exaggerating this tale. As the election approached in 1828, Lundy wrote that he felt that Jackson's own account of the deal was effectively a full confession: "This, we repeat, is Gen. Jackson's own story. It amounts to this. A speculation was to be made in cotton, tobacco and negroes: Coleman was to do the business and Jackson to furnish the means; the negroes were bought up, taken to market, followed by Jackson, part of them sold by himself at Natchez, and the rest carried back by him to Tennessee in the year 1812."

The charges were "sensational and damaging", and Jackson's campaign organization, the Nashville Central Committee (known to his enemies as "the whitewashing committee"), scrambled for a response, initially lying that Jackson had merely been a silent partner, then falling back on a round of whataboutism. The close examination in 1828 of Jackson's enslavement of people like Gilbert, and his history of slave trading, was promulgated in large part by a man named Andrew Erwin, who, according to historian Cheathem, was "determined to undermine Jackson's campaign" for both spite and politics. Erwin and Henry Clay shared a set of grandchildren. Boyd McNairy, whose bank had held accounts for Coleman, Green & Jackson, and who published a broadside headlined "Jackson a negro trader", was a brother of Judge McNairy, and Nathaniel A. McNairy, who dueled John Coffee in 1806 and advertised slaves for sale in Natchez in 1807–08. B. McNairy later wrote in a public letter to Jackson, "You have been charged...with having been engaged, in one or more instances, in NEGRO TRADING—with having employed your capital and credit in the purchase and sale of slaves, for the sake of pecuniary profit. Is this charge true, or is it not? If it be true, why do you not magnanimously and heroically admit it, and defend yourself upon the ground that the habits prevalent in the country and the peculiar state of our society, in a community where slavery unfortunately exists, justified such speculations?" Research by historian Robert Gudmestad found that some border-state newspapers "joined in condemning Jackson" as an alleged slave trader, suggesting a bifurcated perception of the morality of slave ownership versus interstate slave trafficking. Per Liverpool-based historian Michael Tadman, "The case is interesting but it is not clear whether or not the condemnation came from slaveholders or nonslaveholders. Significantly too, it is also not at all clear that, when running as a southern candidate for high political office, being a trader was a problem."

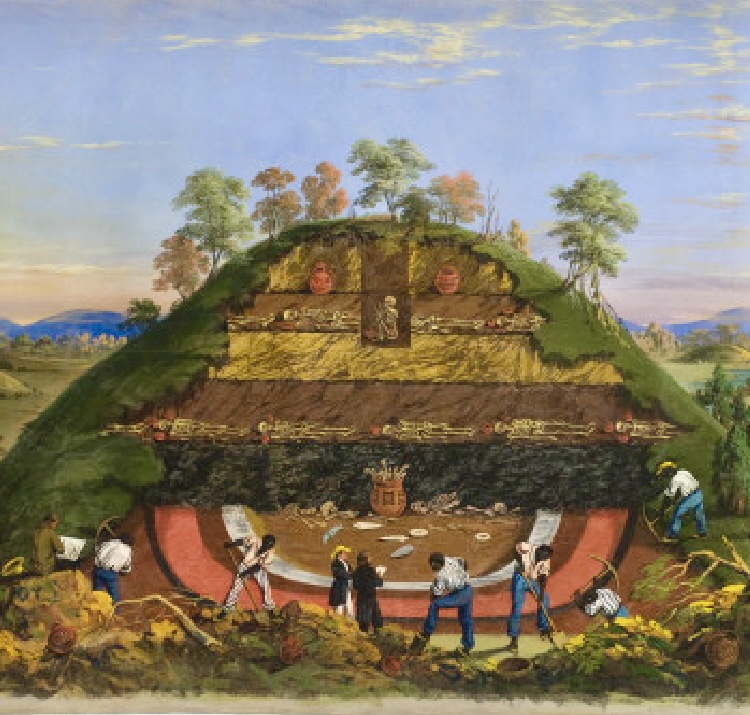
One vignette from Panorama of the Monumental Grandeur of the Mississippi Valley, painted by John J. Egan c. 1850, showing slaves hired by Montroville Wilson Dickeson to excavate the works of the Mound Builders on the plantation of William Ferriday in Concordia Parish, Louisiana (St. Louis Art Museum 34–1953)

Even though "the slaves he bought and sold as a young man as part of the burgeoning interstate trade in enslaved people helped make him rich", during the 1828 United States presidential election, Jackson repudiated the claim that he was a slave trader. Jackson's dishonesty was not his alone. Allies were recruited to swear, falsely, that it was not true. The editorial page of The Ariel of Natchez wrote that it was "a matter of astonishment that the friends of Gen. Jackson have the hardihood to deny that in the year 1811, their idol was not actually and personally engaged in the sale of Negroes as an object of speculation, because like almost every other charge brought against him, the more they endeavor to 'hide the crimes they see' and to screen him from odium, the deeper they impress on the minds of the investigating the strength of the evidence which support them." As retold by Mississippi historian Eron Rowland in 1910, "It may cause some of the warm friends of Old Hickory to scoff to recall the accredited fact that he, in those early days, for a time followed the business of a negro-trader at this place [Old Greenville, Mississippi]. A proof that this fact was not taken with the best grace at that day is that in several political campaigns, his followers were compelled to swear by the eternal that he did not."

Abolitionists Theodore Dwight Weld, Angelina Grimké, and Sarah Moore Grimké, under the banner of the American Anti-Slavery Society, wrote in American Slavery As It Is (1839) that "It is well known that President Jackson was a soul driver..." Lewis Tappan wrote in the margins of his copy, now held in the Amistad Research Center at Tulane University in New Orleans, that Weld said the statement about Jackson was the only thing anyone had ever denied or claimed was incorrect in the book, and further noted, "Mr. Weld informs me (Nov 23|49) that the above was stated to him by J. G. Birney who received it from Mr. Kingsbury, missionary among the Choctaws." (Note: Cyrus Kingsbury (November 22, 1786 – June 27, 1870) preached "that all human beings—blacks and reds as well as whites—were equal before God." His mission was funded in part by the Presbyterian church and in part by the U.S. government. U.S. Secretary of War John C. Calhoun had encouraged Congress to fund religious missions in hopes that education and Americanization would resolve the "Indian problem" without military intervention. Per Kingsbury's letters, the Choctaw Nation was a multicultural place; he described being met by "several half breed natives, two white men, and fifteen or twenty blacks." In his journal entry of September 14, 1799, Presbyterian missionary Rev. Joseph Bullen Jr. recorded a similar observation about the inclusivity of the Chickasaw Nation, writing, "This day a negro who found our situation and business sent us a good supply of bread and meat, which was very timely, as we were weary, hungry, and faint in the wilderness. These negroes have been visited with the outpouring of the spirit of God, inducing them to worship Him, to keep the Sabbath day, and to be exemplary in their lives, while their masters remain in a carnal state. God exalts those of low degree, but the rich he sends away empty." A third minister, the Methodist Learner Blackman, who traveled the road in October 1804 in company with Lorenzo Dow, recounted that the Chickasaw fed them when they ran out of food and that they were reunited with their lost horses by an "Indian and a Negro." Kingsbury's mission in particular was light on proselytizing and heavy on teaching new tools, and "by the end of the first year, the Choctaws had accepted the mission and taken Kingsbury to their hearts." Kingsbury was eventually invited by the Choctaw to help them negotiate the Treaty of Doak's Stand where he witnessed what he characterized as "the cajolery and the temper tantrums of U.S. commissioners Andrew Jackson and Thomas Hinds." Proponents of Indian removal often found that the Protestant missionaries who lived with the nations were among the most problematically effective opponents of their plans, so Kingsbury and other ministers were forbidden by U.S. commissioners John Eaton and John Coffee from participating in the negotiations for what became the Treaty of Dancing Rabbit Creek. At the invitation of the nation, Rev. Kingsbury moved with the Choctaw to Indian Territory during Indian Removal.)

The denial was carried forward—for years, decades, daresay, centuries—by those whom Southern chronicler Harnett T. Kane described as "fist-pounding partisans." In his Jackson bio published 1861 (the first year of the American Civil War), Parton wrote:

"There is an odium attached to this business in the slave States, as is well known; and consequently, the alleged negro trading of General Jackson has excited a great deal of angry controversy. I was myself informed, in a mysterious whisper, by a southern gentleman in high office, that this was the only 'blot' on the character of the General. It is not necessary to investigate a subject of this nature."

Regarding the repeated appearance of the word odium in contemporary accounts of Jackson's trading, historian Sydnor wrote in his 1933 Slavery in Mississippi, "To the present day a certain odium clings to the term slave-trader. It may seem illogical that owners of slaves, who from time to time purchased from traders, would have scorned men in this business, but this seems to have been the case. It is debatable whether the disapproval of the trader in negroes was honest, or whether it was a convenient sentiment which made the slave-trader a scapegoat for much of the evil of slavery." Parton, apparently unbothered by the "blot" or the odium, wrote, "The simple truth respecting it, I presume, is, that having correspondents in Natchez, and being in the habit of sending down boat-loads of produce, the firm of which he was a member occasionally took charge of negroes destined for the lower country, and, it may be, sold them on commission, or otherwise." Nearly 120 years later, in volume one of his three-volume Jackson biography, Remini recapitulated Parton's conclusion almost in its entirety, further downplaying to posterity the importance of slavery in Jackson's life and work: "...because he had agents in Natchez and regularly sent down boatloads of produce, Jackson occasionally engaged in slave trading as a service for a friend or a client." Historian Cheathem argued in 2011 that due to an over-reliance on Parton, Remini, and the Correspondence, at the expense of archival investigation, Jacksonian scholarship has long minimized his slaving, and while "recent research by historians" has resurfaced the political significance of Jackson's slaveholding "...more work remains to be done on his own slave communities in Tennessee and Mississippi and the ramifications for his public actions."

The extended Jackson–Donelson clan is one of a number of American families that have practiced a form of historical negationism that scrubs the occupational histories of American slave traders from obituaries and genealogies. Jackson's great-grandson, schoolteacher Andrew Jackson IV, wrote in the early 20th century, "As a lawyer for the ten years after his admission to the bar Jackson saw to it that he was well paid for this dangerous frontier law work. For an ordinary law suit he got one square mile of land for his fee. By 1796 he had been paid 50,000 square miles in fees." A distant cousin, Charles S. Caffery, wrote in the early 1950s of his direct ancestor, Jackson's brother-in-law John Caffery, "[Jackson's] defamers said that he dealt in negroes but this was never proven. He did buy goods by the boat load and resold at retail through agents. John Caffery went early to Natchez, Mississippi, as Jackson's agent." (Note: An unsigned letter published in the Tennessee Gazette of February 18, 1800, announced, "...with pleasure we state that capt. Caffery, with a public spirit peculiar to himself proposes carrying any species of produce to New Orleans for the moderate price of one dollar, per hundred which is the price (I understand) from the Natches. So laudable an undertaking deserves to be encouraged by every well wisher to this country, since it is presumed it will establish a precedent that must lead to more extensive undertakings..." One study of early American mercantile enterprises stated that "By the early 1790s American trading firms had come to recognize the value of having an agent in New Orleans. Such men were able to quicken the pace of trade by smoothing the way at the southern terminal of the network." The fifth-born of the 11 children of John Caffery and Mary Donelson, Mary "Patsy" Caffery, married Abraham Green of the Natchez District in approximately 1801.) According to Tadman, "Slave trading and the forcible separation of slave families were pervasive...in the South generally and...traders tended to be men of considerable wealth and status. The trade, however, was awkward to fit with southern white claims of benevolence and tended therefore to be hidden."

== Connection to other Jackson controversies ==
Several of Jackson's personal and political conflicts involved the trade. In 1828, as Jackson battled claims that he had abetted Rachel Donelson Robards in committing adultery, the Anti-Jackson Expositor discounted the assertion that one Colonel Stark had chaperoned Rachel to Natchez, because Stark had been carrying slaves to sell in Mississippi: "Do you not know and believe that Col. Stark had no white female family with him in descending the river from Nashville; and that he was not related to Mrs. Robards; and that it would have been rash in her to have descended the river with Col. Stark and his negroes?" (Note: In 1789, at age 22, Jackson was one of "several leaders of the Tennessee settlements" who "opened negotiations with a Spanish agent to discuss his government's intervention with the Creeks, and [who] hinted at possible secession from North Carolina." The pre-1815 pioneer settlers of the greater Mississippi River valley were not necessarily bound by oath nor emotion to any given national-colonial identity, and as such, "American officials deeply distrusted the various white settler groups...a threatening amalgamation of land speculators, merchants, and slaveholders; ancient and 'new' French planters, Old Regime Conservatives, Bonapartist imperialists, Saint Domingue refugees, British Loyalists, Spanish officials, and expatriated Americans; all of whom seemed ready to raise the standard of any imperial power that promised to protect slavery." A Col. Stark was mentioned by James Robertson in a 1789 letter hinting that Cumberland settlers would likely attach themselves to Spain if North Carolina would not grant them certain concessions. This is Revolutionary War veteran Robert Stark (1740–1808), a Virginian who had worked in the Ninety-Six District of South Carolina, and came to Natchez in about 1790. In April 1794, on his way out of Natchez, Stark sold a woman named Isabella, and three children, to planter Thomas Foster. A few months later Isabella married Abdul Rahman Ibrahima ibn Sori (Arabic: عبد الرحمن ابراهيم سوري), an enslaved prince of Fula who trained Foster's horses.) Rachel's first husband, Lewis Robards, may have been a slave trader. Two of Robards' grandsons (by his second wife), Alfred O. and Lewis C. Robards, were quite infamous Kentucky slave traders, with the younger Lewis having a particularly unsavory reputation. He specialized in "fancy girls," and he allegedly conspired to kidnap free people of color to sell South.

In an early letter about the 1806 duel in which he killed Charles Dickinson, Jackson wrote, "for the present it will only be observed that the deceased, could not be called a Citizen of this state—that he was engaged in the humane persuit of purchasing Negroes in Maryland and carrying them to Natchez & Louisa and thus making a fortune of speculating on human flesh". Dickinson was indeed a slave trader too: In 1882, the Denton Journal described a derelict outbuilding on what had once been Dickinson's property near Preston, Maryland, where "staples and ringbolts" for chaining slaves were still embedded in the "massive timbers" of the old barn, originally constructed as a trader's slave pen. Dickinson's father-in-law Joseph Erwin was also a slave trader. In 1810 Jackson and his slave-trading partner Joseph Coleman both testified about the good character of victim Patton Anderson at the Nashville murder trial of the Magnesses. Anderson was the brother of Jackson's aide-de-camp W. P. Anderson, and had worked locally as a trader in land warrants, horses, and slaves.

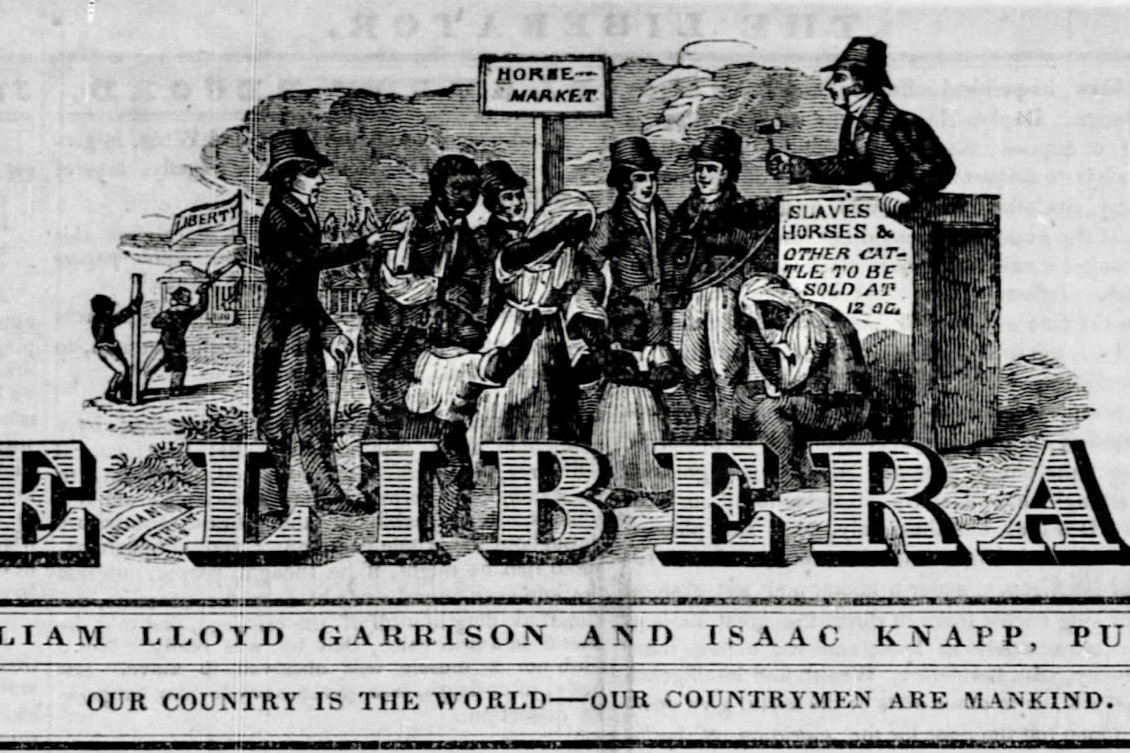
In 1831, the first title-band art for the abolitionist newspaper The Liberator depicted a slave auction under a horse market sign, a whipping post set up in front of the U.S. Capitol, and an Indian treaty discarded in the mud and forgotten.

Appointed as United States Indian commissioners for a series of treaty negotiations in the 1810s and 1820s, Andrew Jackson, and his old business partner John Coffee (a "simple" man who was "absolutely devoted" to Jackson), and Thomas Hinds, who had married into the Green family that was so closely aligned with Jackson's early years in Mississippi, and John Eaton, the husband of one of Jackson's wards and his future Secretary of War, acquired land from the tribes of the southeast as "a matter of economic urgency." A steady stream of White immigrants doubled the region's population between 1810 and 1820. These settlers dragged slaves along with them, to break the land, and they funded rudimentary local governments with their land-use taxes. Jackson and his Donelson kinsmen, and their adjutants, aides-de-camp, sergeants, foot soldiers, goons, cronies, vassals, franchisees, and friends, engaged in what has been described as vertically integrated family-business imperialism: "They fought the native peoples, negotiated the treaties to end the fighting and demanded native lands as the price of war, surveyed the newly available lands, bought those lands, litigated over disputed boundaries, adjudicated the cases, and made and kept laws within the region that had been carved out of Indian lands." That surveying was just another name for colonization was well understood by America's aboriginal people. In the winter of 1786 Hanging Maw, head chief of the Overhill Cherokee, scattered a band of Whites at Defeated Creek and captured their horses, provisions, and surveying equipment. He later taunted the original owners that he had smashed their land stealer, a compass, against a tree.

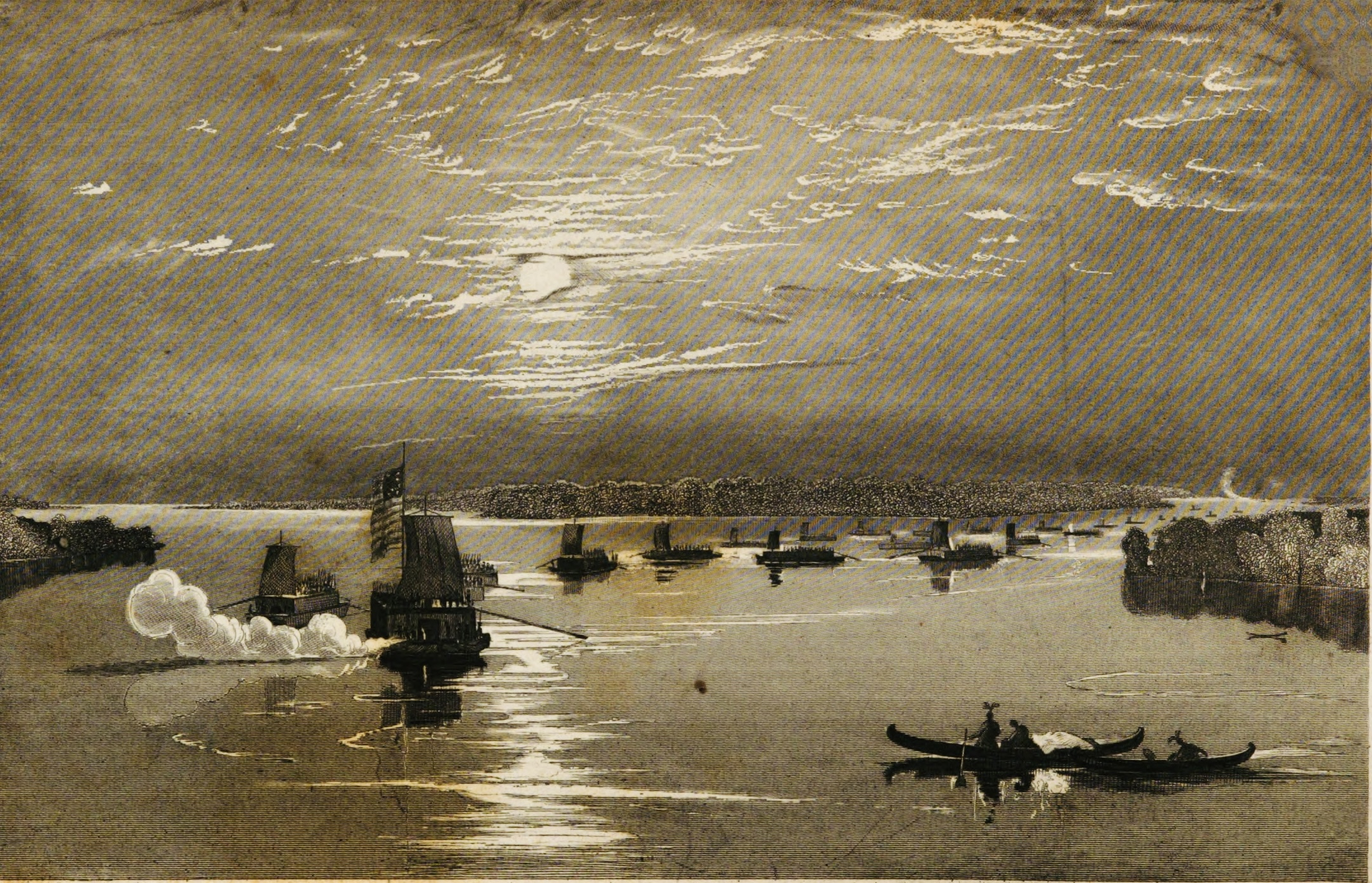
Sumner County "scout, Indian fighter, farmer" and devout Methodist John Carr participated in the fruitless 1813 Natchez expedition (depicted in Amos Kendall's 1843 Life of Andrew Jackson with caption "Andrew Jackson's flotilla descending the Mississippi"). Carr later wrote that Jackson was at that time "a wicked man".

As he had done following Dickinson's death, Jackson pointed the finger again in 1819, when he was called to account for what he called "this Savage and Negro War", an 1818 self-authorized punitive expedition against the Red Sticks faction of the Muscogee Confederation and other communities of color in Florida (such as the people of the Negro Fort). These groups had been allied with the British during the War of 1812, and they had long frustrated both Jackson and the Georgia Patriots. Treasury Secretary William H. Crawford was "a severe critic of his Florida adventure. Jackson had information that linked Crawford with the alleged slave-smuggling activities of Georgia's former governor, David B. Mitchell. On September 28, 1819, Jackson, the former slave trader, wrote a 'Private' letter to President Monroe proposing an investigation of Crawford's activities..." (Note: For a full explanation involving the Seminole War, Florida Patriot War, Troupites, Clarkites, Crawfordites, political triangulation by Calhoun, and much more, see Fair, John D. (2015). "Governor David B. Mitchell and the 'Black Birds' Slave Smuggling Scandal". The Georgia Historical Quarterly. 99 (4). Savannah, Georgia: Georgia Historical Society: 253–289. ISSN 0016-8297. JSTOR 24636783. OCLC 565102618..) This, argued Frederick M. Binder in 1968, was a part of a lifelong pattern in Jackson's dealings with slaves and slavery, in which he remained "emotionally uninvolved" while alternately using appeals for and against various moral and social positions in pursuit of his own ends: "He viewed slavery as a convenient weapon of political warfare."

According to American Slavery As It Is, Andrew Erwin's son James Erwin and son-in-law Henry Hitchcock were slave traders: "It is known in Alabama, that Mr. Erwin, son-in-law of the Hon. Henry Clay, and brother of J. P. Erwin, formerly postmaster, and late mayor of the city of Nashville, laid the foundation of a princely fortune in the slave-trade, carried on from the Northern Slave States to the Planting South." In July 1828, under the hypocrisy-charging headline Quis tulerit Gracchos de seditione querentes?, the Louisiana Advertiser surfaced the same claim, referenced the same Georgia slave-smuggling scandal, and analogized Erwin's Gen. Jackson's Negro Speculations to other counter-Jacksonian political movements, including the War of 1812-era Hartford Convention and the so-called Corrupt Bargain of 1824: "...to the same cause we may attribute Erwin's denunciation of general Jackson as a dealer in negroes, the same Erwin who was concerned in smuggling African negroes through the Creek nation, the same Erwin who was stigmatized by the attorney general of the United States (Mr. Wirt) as guilty of perjury, the same Erwin whose philanthropic son, the son-in-law of Henry Clay, annually imports and sells hundreds of negroes in the public streets of New Orleans."

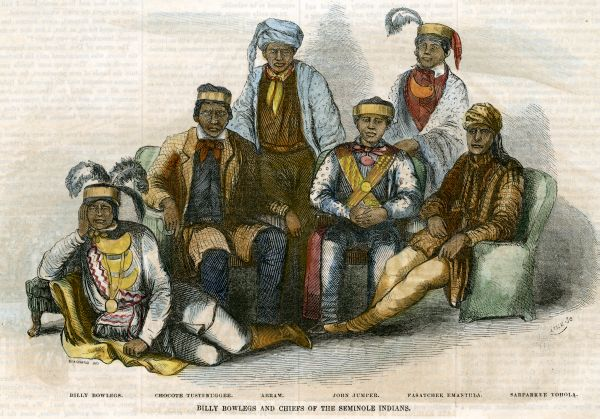
Hand-colored etching based on a daguerreotype made in New York in 1852 of Seminole leaders Billy Bowlegs, Thlocklo Tustenuggee, Abram, John Jumper, Fasatchee Emanthla, and Sarparkee Yohola. During the Second Seminole War and removal period, Abraham, who had been "born a slave," served as an interpreter and lieutenant for Micanopy, leader of the Alachua people. (Florida State Library MC12-13)

Perhaps most importantly, Andrew Jackson's early arrival in the Deep South as a businessman led to his role in the Battle of New Orleans, extinguishing British hopes of regaining control of the lower Mississippi, and to his military conquest of land that remained in the hands of Indigenous people and the Spanish crown. Jackson's actions in the Creek War and the War of 1812 "greatly accelerated the transformation of ethnic relations already underway" such that "the final shot in the Battle of New Orleans signaled the beginning of a race into the Old Southwest." Gideon Morgan, colonel of the Regiment of Cherokee Indians during the Creek War, tried to rally Cherokee to fight with Jackson again during the first Seminole War by promising that that the Seminole (Semvnole) "had many blacks fighting with them who could be brought home as the booty of war." For his part, in 1821, 10 days before the ratification of the Adams–Onís Treaty and a month before he became military commissioner of Florida, Jackson advised an associate, James Craine Bronaugh, to seek profit in the transfer of power from Spain to the United States: "With a small fund, and good recommendations a great spec might be made at Pensacola and Ft St Augustine, by the purchase of negroes from subjects who will leave the Territory. with a fourth advanced, one two and three years might be obtained for the ballance well guranteed." Jackson's installation as military governor was optimistically hailed by Niles' Register as the appointment of a hardliner who would energetically enforce anti-piracy statues. The suppression of piracy in and around the Caribbean Sea was ever poorly funded and never achieved, and sparsely settled Florida, "because of its long and indented coastline and of its proximity to Cuba," remained a gateway for illegal importation of slaves from Africa to the United States through Jackson's lifetime and beyond.

Jackson's campaigns against the Seminole in the 1810s begat the second Seminole War during his presidency, which was triggered in part because "a unified band of defiant Native Americans and African Americans was a dangerous symbol when located so closely to a burgeoning plantation society built on the backs of enslaved people." Former slaves found some degree of safety and prosperity in the sovereign Seminole lands. The fact that Seminole leaders simply refused to allow these people to be turned back into products was intolerable to the Jackson administration. Carey A. Harris, appointed by Jackson in 1836 to run the Indian department and a strong candidate for "most corrupt" leader of the Bureau of Indian Affairs, numbered amongst his accomplishments expediting "the process whereby white men with political influence in Florida Territory and neighboring states could obtain black slaves from the Seminoles...his directives facilitated their efforts to obtain slaves at the expense of their Indian masters."

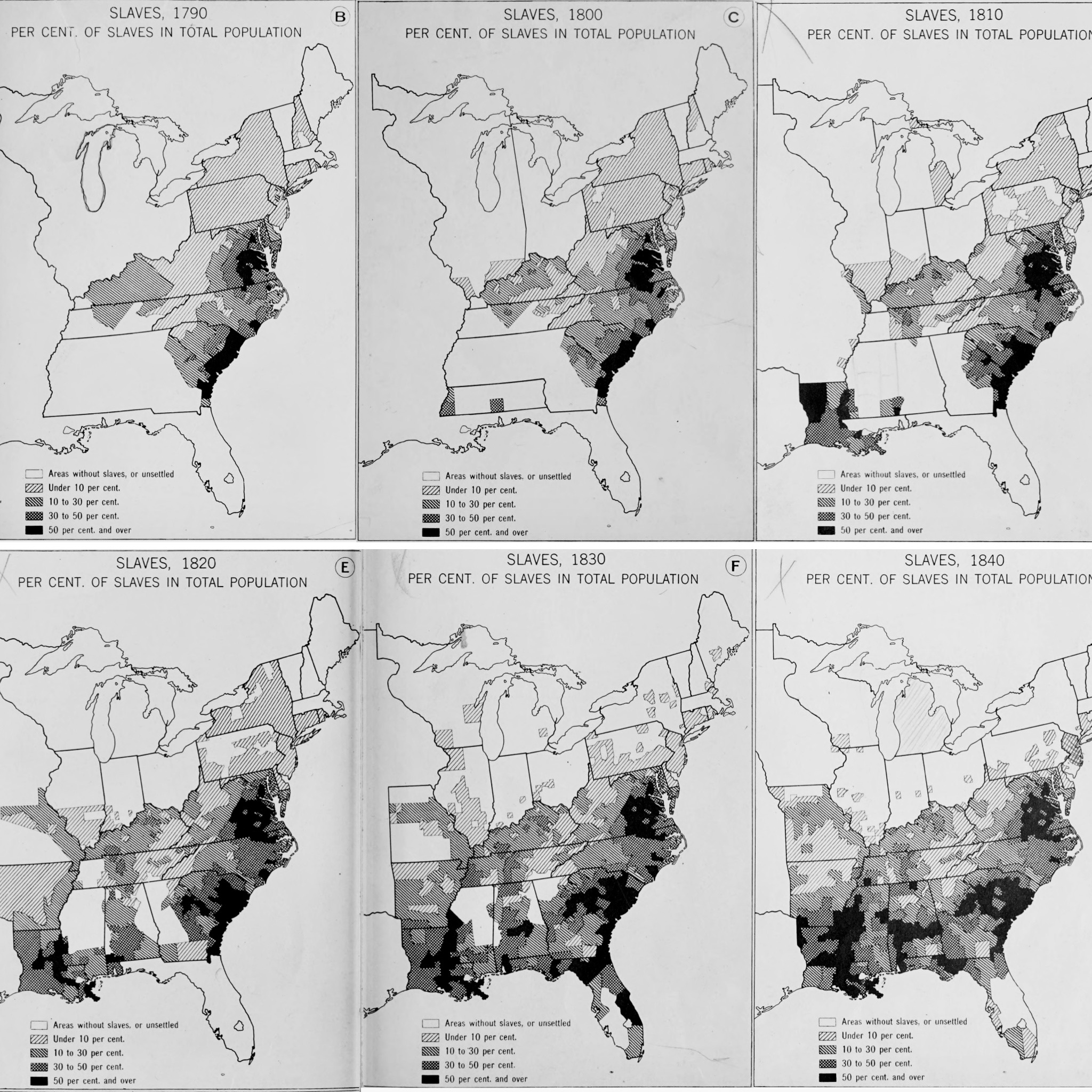
Slaves enumerated in the diennal census, 1790–1840, represented as a percentage of the total population; the white "holes" with "zero" slaves were sovereign Indian country

Historian Edward Pessen argued in 1985 that Jackson's only foundational and immutable values were the "sanctity of financial obligations", that wealth signified virtue, that slavery was good, and that Indians had no rights. In 1834, with Jacksonian federal Indian Removal well underway, The Liberator abolitionist newspaper published Nashville minister Marius R. Robinson's report on the internal slave trade:

In Mississippi and Louisiana the slave market is literally crowded. There are three principal reasons for the large demand.—1st. The high price of cotton last fall, induced many planters to go more largely into the cultivation of it, which increased the demand for laborers. 2nd. The cholera has swept off thousands of negroes during the last two years, and the planters are now filling up the ranks made thin by this scourge. 3rd. The country wrested from the Choctaw Indians has recently been brought into market. Of course the lands must now be cultivated by slaves.

== See also ==
- Andrew Jackson and slavery
- Andrew Jackson's plantations in northern Alabama
- Bibliography of Andrew Jackson
- Bibliography of the slave trade in the United States
- Bibliography of slavery in the United States
- Family separation in American slavery
- Indigenous members of the Andrew Jackson household
- Wards of Andrew Jackson
- Stockley D. Hays § Slave ownership
- Historical rankings of presidents of the United States § Scholar survey summary
- Political eras of the United States
- List of presidents of the United States who owned slaves
- List of slave traders of the United States
- History of the United States dollar
- Numismatic history of the United States § American coinage (1792–c. 1837)
- Lewis and Clark Expedition
- Dunbar and Hunter Expedition
- Abolitionism in the United Kingdom
- Abolitionism in the United States
- John Quincy Adams and abolitionism

== Sources ==
=== Secondary sources ===
- Abernethy, Thomas Perkins (October 1927). "Andrew Jackson and the Rise of South-Western Democracy". The American Historical Review. 33 (1). American Historical Association. Oxford University Press: 64–77. doi:10.2307/1838111. ISSN 0002-8762. JSTOR 1838111.
- ——— (1932). From Frontier to Plantation in Tennessee: A Study in Frontier Democracy. Chapel Hill, North Carolina: University of North Carolina Press. LCCN 32012393. OCLC 988186705.
- Allison, John (1897). Dropped Stitches in Tennessee History. Nashville: Marshall & Bruce Co. hdl:loc.gdc/scd0001.00146459547. LCCN rc01001272. OCLC 60722027. OL 17359025W. – Also digitized by Project Gutenberg This article incorporates text from this source, which is in the public domain.
- Anderson, James Douglas; Peyton, Balie (1916). Making the American Thoroughbred: Especially in Tennessee, 1800–1845, Including Reminiscences of the Turf. Norwood, Massachusetts: The Plimpton Press. hdl:1017/d/print/1316111. LCCN 16016543. OCLC 4974195. OL 7741515W. – Also digitized by UPenn Libraries This article incorporates text from this source, which is in the public domain.
- Apple, Lindsey (2011). The Family Legacy of Henry Clay: In the Shadow of a Kentucky Patriarch. Topics in Kentucky History. Lexington, Kentucky: University Press of Kentucky. ISBN 978-0-8131-3410-9. LCCN 2011019756. OCLC 753969024. Project MUSE book 2573.
- Arnow, Harriette Simpson (December 1960). "The Pioneer Farmer and His Crops in the Cumberland Region". Tennessee Historical Quarterly. XIX (4): 291–327. ISSN 0040-3261. JSTOR 42621803.
- Bacon, H. Phillip (December 1956). "Some Problems of Adjustment to Nashville's Site and Situation 1780–1860". Tennessee Historical Quarterly. 15 (4): 322–329. ISSN 0040-3261. JSTOR 42621308.
- Baldwin, Leland D. (1980) [1941]. The Keelboat Age on Western Waters. Western Pennsylvania Historical Society (Reprint ed.). University of Pittsburgh Press. ISBN 978-0-8229-5319-7. LCCN 41010342.
- Bancroft, Frederic (2023) [1931, 1996]. Slave Trading in the Old South (Original publisher: J. H. Fürst Co., Baltimore). Southern Classics Series. Introduction by Michael Tadman (Reprint ed.). Columbia, South Carolina: University of South Carolina Press. ISBN 978-1-6433-6427-8. LCCN 95020493. OCLC 1153619151.
- Barnett, James F. (2012). "Chapter 6: 1801–1837, Treaties and Removal". Mississippi's American Indians. Heritage of Mississippi Series, Vol. II. Jackson, Mississippi: University Press of Mississippi. doi:10.14325/mississippi/9781617032455.003.0007. ISBN 978-1-61703-245-5. JSTOR j.ctt24hws3. LCCN 2011041573. OCLC 785240442. Project MUSE book 86318.
- Belko, William S., ed. (2010). America's Hundred Years' War: U.S. Expansion to the Gulf Coast and the Fate of the Seminole, 1763–1858. Gainesville, Florida: University Press of Florida. ISBN 978-0-8130-4514-6. LCCN 2010024271. OCLC 801840927. Project MUSE book 19493.
- Binder, Frederick M. (1968). "V: Andrew Jackson and the Negro". The Color Problem in Early National America as Viewed by John Adams, Jefferson and Jackson. Studies in American History VII. The Hague, Netherlands: Mouton & Co. NV. pp. 120–135. LCCN 68017871. OCLC 426813.
- Blaakman, Michael A. (2023). Speculation Nation: Land Mania in the Revolutionary American Republic. Early American Studies. Philadelphia, Pennsylvania: University of Pennsylvania Press. ISBN 978-1-5128-2448-3.
- Bunn, Mike; Williams, Clay (2023). Old Southwest to Old South: Mississippi, 1798–1840. Heritage of Mississippi Series, Vol. IX. Jackson: University Press of Mississippi. ISBN 978-1-4968-4380-7. LCCN 2022042580. OCLC 1348393702. Project MUSE book 109599.
- Burstein, Andrew (2003). The Passions of Andrew Jackson. New York: Alfred A. Knopf. ISBN 978-0-3754-1428-2. LCCN 2002016258. OCLC 49385944.
- Caldwell, Mary French (1933). Andrew Jackson's Hermitage. Ladies' Hermitage Association, Nashville, Tennessee. Kingsport, Tennessee: Kingsport Press. LCCN 34042460. OCLC 682462818 – via HathiTrust.
- Campbell, Jack MacGregor (2017). The Great Magness Trial: The Killing of Patton Anderson, The Trial of the Magness Family, & the Pursuit of Justice on the Tennessee Frontier. Dickson, Tennessee: Braybree Publishing. ISBN 978-1-940127-12-5. LCCN 2017278701. OCLC 1040034531.
- Carey, Bill (2018). Runaways, Coffles and Fancy Girls: A History of Slavery in Tennessee. Nashville, Tennessee: Clearbrook Press. ISBN 978-0-9725680-4-3. LCCN 2018903570. OCLC 1045068878.
- Carson, W. Wallace (June 1920). "Transportation and Traffic on the Ohio and the Mississippi Before the Steamboat". The Mississippi Valley Historical Review. VII (1). Organization of American Historians. Oxford University Press: 26–38. doi:10.2307/1886569. ISSN 0161-391X. JSTOR 1886569. OCLC 1776316.
- Cheathem, Mark R. (April 2011). "Andrew Jackson, Slavery, and Historians". History Compass. 9 (4). John Wiley & Sons: 326–338. doi:10.1111/j.1478-0542.2011.00763.x. ISSN 1478-0542.
- ——— (October 2011). Slavery, Kinship, and Andrew Jackson's Presidential Campaign of 1828 (PDF). Southern Historical Association Annual Meeting. jacksonianamerica.com. Archived (PDF) from the original on 2024-08-22.
- ——— (2014). Andrew Jackson, Southerner. Baton Rouge, Louisiana: Louisiana State University Press. ISBN 978-0-8071-5099-3. LCCN 2012049695. OCLC 858995561. Project MUSE book 26506.
- Clark, Thomas D.; Guice, John D. W. (1996). The Old Southwest, 1795–1830: Frontiers in Conflict. Norman, Oklahoma: University of Oklahoma Press. ISBN 978-0-8061-2836-8. LCCN 95042772. OCLC 33243351.
- Clavin, Matthew (2010). "8. 'It is a negro, not an Indian war': Southampton, St. Domingo, and the Second Seminole War". doi:10.5744/florida/9780813035253.003.0008. in Belko 2010.
- Coker, William S. (Summer 1972). "Research in the Spanish Borderlands: Mississippi, 1779–1798". Latin American Research Review. 7 (2). Latin American Studies Association. University of Texas Press: 40–54. doi:10.1017/S0023879100041364. ISSN 1542-4278. JSTOR 2502625.
- Cole, Donald B. (2009). Vindicating Andrew Jackson: The 1828 Election and the Rise of the Two-Party System. American Presidential Elections. Lawrence, Kansas: University Press of Kansas. ISBN 978-0-7006-1661-9. LCCN 2009015244. OCLC 318645762. Project MUSE book 87476.
- Cotterill, R. S. (April 1921). "The Natchez Trace". Tennessee Historical Magazine. 7 (1). Tennessee Historical Society: 27–35. ISSN 2333-9012. JSTOR 42637460. OCLC 33024153. This article incorporates text from this source, which is in the public domain.
- Curtin, Philip D. (1969). The Atlantic Slave Trade: A Census. Madison, Wisconsin: University of Wisconsin Press. ISBN 978-0-2990-5400-7. LCCN 69017325. OCLC 462849477.
- Daniels, Jonathan (1971) [1962]. The devil's backbone: the story of the Natchez Trace. American Trails Series. New York: McGraw-Hill. ISBN 978-0-07-015306-6. LCCN 61018131. OCLC 499827 – via Internet Archive.
- Davis, Ronald L.F. (April 1993). The Black Experience in Natchez, 1720–1880. Special History Study, Natchez National Historical Park. U.S. National Park Service, Department of the Interior. LCCN 94139063. OCLC 817041561. List no. 93-0393-P – via HathiTrust.
- DeRosier, Arthur H. Jr. (Winter 1972). "Cyrus Kingsbury—Missionary to the Choctaws". Journal of Presbyterian History. 50 (4). Lancaster, Pennsylvania: Department of History of the United Presbyterian Church in the U.S.A. (The Presbyterian Historical Society): 267–287. ISSN 0022-3883. JSTOR 23327342. OCLC 564187337.
- DesChamps, Margaret Burr (September 1947). "Early Days in the Cumberland Country". Tennessee Historical Quarterly. VI (3): 195–229. ISSN 0040-3261. JSTOR 42620950.
- Dew, Charles B. (2016). The Making of a Racist: A Southerner Reflects on Family, History, and the Slave Trade. Charlottesville, Virginia: University of Virginia Press. ISBN 978-0-8139-3888-2. LCCN 2015043815. OCLC 956713856.
- Deyle, Steven H. (2005). Carry Me Back: The Domestic Slave Trade in American Life. New York: Oxford University Press. ISBN 978-0195160406. LCCN 2004056840. OCLC 61342034. OL 7390529M.
- Dodd, Dorothy (January 1935). "The Schooner Emperor: An Incident of the Illegal Slave Trade in Florida". Florida Historical Society Quarterly. 13 (3) 3: 117–128. ISSN 2327-980X. JSTOR 30150185. OCLC 80905201 – via University of Central Florida Libraries.
- Egerton, Douglas R. (Summer 1987). "An Update on Jacksonian Historiography: The Biographies". Tennessee Historical Quarterly. 46 (2): 79–85. ISSN 0040-3261. JSTOR 42626661.
- Ely, James W. (Winter 1979). "The Legal Practice of Andrew Jackson". Tennessee Historical Quarterly. 38 (4): 421–435. ISSN 0040-3261. JSTOR 42626016.
- Eriksson, Erik McKinley (March 1937). "President Jackson's Propaganda Agencies". Pacific Historical Review. 6 (1). Arthur H. Clark Co., Glendale, California. University of California Press: 47–57. doi:10.2307/3634106. ISSN 0030-8684. JSTOR 3634106. OCLC 45954834.
- Gates, Paul Wallace (May 1956). "Private Land Claims in the South". The Journal of Southern History. 22 (2): 183–204. doi:10.2307/2954238. ISSN 0022-4642. JSTOR 2954238. OCLC 558551244.
- Goodstein, Anita Shafer (1989). Nashville, 1780–1860: From Frontier to City. Gainesville, Florida: University of Florida Press. ISBN 978-0-8130-0940-7. LCCN 89033186. OCLC 19669897.
- Greene, Jerome (2010). "The New Orleans Campaign of 1814–1815 and the Chalmette Battlefield". In Birkedal, Ted (ed.). Search for the Lost Riverfront: Historical and Archeological Investigations at the Chalmette Battlefield, Jean Lafitte National Historical Park and Preserve. U.S. National Park Service. LCCN 2010443479. OCLC 1014291708. This article incorporates text from this source, which is in the public domain.
- Gudmestad, Robert (2003). A Troublesome Commerce: The Transformation of the Interstate Slave Trade, 1808–1840. Baton Rouge: Louisiana State University Press. ISBN 0-8071-2884-8. LCCN 2003009434. OCLC 1412563835.
- Hamilton, William B. (May 1948). "Politics in the Mississippi Territory". Huntington Library Quarterly. 11 (3). Henry E. Huntington Library and Art Gallery, San Marino, California. University of Pennsylvania Press: 277–291. doi:10.2307/3815950. ISSN 0018-7895. JSTOR 3815950. OCLC 979924936.
- Hammond, John Craig (Summer 2012). "Slavery, Settlement, and Empire: The Expansion and Growth of Slavery in the Interior of the North American Continent, 1770–1820". Journal of the Early Republic. 32 (2): 175–206. doi:10.1353/jer.2012.0029. ISSN 0275-1275. JSTOR 41478766. OCLC 44849568.
- Hardeman, Nicholas Perkins (1977). Wilderness Calling: The Hardeman Family in the American Westward Movement, 1750–1900. Knoxville, Tennessee: University of Tennessee Press. ISBN 978-0-87049-194-8. LCCN 76000980. OCLC 2005980 – via Internet Archive.
- Harrell, Laura D. S. (July 1951). "Horse Racing in the Old Natchez District, 1783–1830". Journal of Mississippi History. XIII (3) 1. Jackson, Mississippi: Mississippi Historical Society: 123–137. ISSN 0022-2771. OCLC 1782329.
- ——— (November 1966). "Jockey Clubs and Race Tracks in Antebellum Mississippi, 1795–1861". Journal of Mississippi History. XXVIII (4). Jackson, Mississippi: Mississippi Historical Society in cooperation with the Mississippi Department of Archives and History: 304–318. ISSN 0022-2771. OCLC 1782329.
- Heidler, Jeanne T.; Heidler, David S. (2018). The Rise of Andrew Jackson: Myth, Manipulation, and the Making of Modern Politics. New York: Basic Books. ISBN 978-0-465-09756-2. LCCN 2018015938. OCLC 1056909422.
- Henderson, T. R. (July 2014). "The Destruction of Littafuchee, and a Brief History of American Settlement". Alabama Review. 67 (3). Alabama Historical Association. University of Alabama Press: 233–253. doi:10.1353/ala.2014.0028. ISSN 2166-9961. OCLC 1007553588. Project MUSE 552367.
- Hickey, Donald R. (Winter 1976). "Andrew Jackson and the Army Haircut: Individual Rights vs. Military Discipline". Tennessee Historical Quarterly. 35 (4): 365–375. ISSN 0040-3261. JSTOR 42623606.
- Howe, Daniel Walker (2007). What Hath God Wrought: The Transformation of America, 1815–1848. The Oxford History of the United States. New York City: Oxford University Press. ISBN 978-0-1950-7894-7. LCCN 2007012370. OCLC 122701433.
- Hsiung, David C. (1991). "The Social World of Middle Tennessee, 1780–1840". In Holden, Robert J. (ed.). Selected Papers from the 1989 and 1990 George Rogers Clark Trans-Appalachian Frontier History Conferences (Online [2011] ed.). Vincennes, Indiana: U.S. National Park Service and Vincennes University. OCLC 28524305.
- Hulbert, Archer Butler (1920). The Paths of Inland Commerce: A Chronicle of Trail, Road, and Waterway. The Chronicles of America Series, Vol. 21. New Haven, Connecticut: Yale University Press. LCCN 20004902. OCLC 1225847. OL 6623382M. This article incorporates text from this source, which is in the public domain.
- Inman, Natalie R. (2017). Brothers and Friends: Kinship in Early America. Early American Spaces. Athens, Georgia: University of Georgia Press. doi:10.1353/book51901. ISBN 978-0-8203-5110-0. LCCN 2016055415. OCLC 985105661.
- Irelan, John R. (1887). The Republic, or, A History of the United States of America in the Administrations: from the Monarchic Colonial Days to the Present Times. Vol. 7, History of the Life, Administration and Times of Andrew Jackson, Seventh President of the United States: Indian Wars of the South, War of 1812, and First Decade of the New Era. Chicago: Fairbanks and Palmer Publishing Co. LCCN 02002685. OCLC 7783325. OL 24712701W.
- Kane, Harnett T. (1947). Natchez on the Mississippi. New York: William Morrow. LCCN 47011784. OCLC 1404534 – via Internet Archive.
- Keith, LeeAnna (2008). The Colfax Massacre: The Untold Story of Black Power, White Terror, and the Death of Reconstruction. New York: Oxford University Press. ISBN 978-0-19-531026-9. LCCN 2007023368. OCLC 191027904.
- Kinard, Margaret (March 1949). "Frontier Development of Williamson County". Tennessee Historical Quarterly. VIII (1): 3–33. ISSN 0040-3261. JSTOR 42620999.
- Kinnaird, Lawrence (1946). "Introduction". Spain in the Mississippi Valley, 1765–1794, Translations of Materials from the Spanish Archives in the Bancroft Library, Part II: Post-War Decade, 1782–1791. Vol. III. Annual Report of the American Historical Association for the Year 1945. Washington, D.C.: U.S. Government Printing Office. LCCN 49046542. OCLC 1477729769.
- Layton, Brandon (February 2016). "Indian Country to Slave Country: The Transformation of Natchez during the American Revolution". The Journal of Southern History. 82 (1). Southern Historical Association, University of Georgia. Rice University: 27–58. ISSN 0022-4642. JSTOR 43918205. OCLC 558551244.
- Leach, Douglas Edward (December 1959). "John Gordon of Gordon's Ferry". Tennessee Historical Quarterly. 18 (4): 322–344. ISSN 0040-3261. JSTOR 42621449.
- Libby, David J. (2004). Slavery and Frontier Mississippi, 1720–1835. Jackson: University Press of Mississippi. ISBN 978-1-4237-3209-9. LCCN 2003010748. OCLC 62257672.
- Kennedy, Roger G. (2000). Burr, Hamilton, and Jefferson: A Study in Character. New York: Oxford University Press. doi:10.1093/acprof:oso/9780195140552.001.0001. ISBN 978-0-1998-4877-5. LCCN 99022453. OCLC 181840559.
- McLoughlin, William Gerald (1986). Cherokee Renascence in the New Republic (ebook ed.). Princeton, N.J.: Princeton University Press. ISBN 978-0-691-04741-6. JSTOR j.ctv39x611. LCCN 86042843. OCLC 13859438. OL 2129522W. Project MUSE book 61052.
- Mitchell, Dennis J. (2014). A New History of Mississippi. Jackson, Mississippi: University Press of Mississippi. ISBN 9781626740198. LCCN 2013044104. OCLC 863127649. Project MUSE book 33980.
- Mooney, Chase C. (1971) [1957]. "Chapter Two: Hire, Sale, Theft and Flight of Slaves". Slavery in Tennessee. Indiana University Publications, Social Science Series No. 17 (Reprint ed.). Westport, Connecticut: Negro Universities Press. ISBN 978-0-8371-5522-7. LCCN 74138683. OCLC 609222448 – via HathiTrust.
- Mooney, James (1900). "Myths of the Cherokee". In Powell, J. W. (ed.). Nineteenth Annual Report of the Bureau of American Ethnology to the Secretary of the Smithsonian Institution, in Two Parts. Washington, D.C.: U.S. Government Printing Office. pp. 3–548. ISSN 0097-269X. LCCN 07038073. OCLC 1768179 – via library.si.edu.
- Mooney, Katherine C. (2014). Race Horse Men: How Slavery and Freedom Were Made at the Racetrack. Cambridge, Massachusetts: Harvard University Press. doi:10.4159/harvard.9780674419551. ISBN 978-0-6744-1955-1. JSTOR j.ctt6wpr00. LCCN 2013037080. OCLC 880147852.
- Morris, Christopher (1995). Becoming Southern: The Evolution of a Way of Life, Warren County and Vicksburg, Mississippi, 1770–1860. New York: Oxford University Press. doi:10.1093/oso/9780195083668.001.0001. ISBN 978-0-1950-8366-8. LCCN 93037916. OCLC 437115869.
- Mueller, Ken (2014). Senator Benton and the People: Master Race Democracy on the Early American Frontier. Early American Places. Ithaca, New York: Cornell University Press. ISBN 9781501757556. OCLC 1203952026. Project MUSE book 83601.
- Narrett, David E. (January 2012). "Geopolitics and Intrigue: James Wilkinson, the Spanish Borderlands, and Mexican Independence". The William and Mary Quarterly. 69 (1): 101–146. doi:10.5309/willmaryquar.69.1.0101. ISSN 0043-5597. JSTOR 10.5309/willmaryquar.69.1.0101.
- Opal, J. M. (October 2013). "General Jackson's Passports: Natural Rights and Sovereign Citizens in the Political Thought of Andrew Jackson, 1780s–1820s". Studies in American Political Development. 27 (2): 69–85. doi:10.1017/S0898588X13000060. ISSN 0898-588X.
- Owsley, Harriet Chappell (Winter 1977). "The Marriages of Rachel Donelson". Tennessee Historical Quarterly. 36 (4). Nashville, Tennessee: Tennessee Historical Society: 479–492. ISSN 0040-3261. JSTOR 42625784. OCLC 551288487.
- Parton, James (1861a). Life of Andrew Jackson. Vol. I. New York: Mason Brothers. LCCN 11016613. OCLC 864685. OL 14020167M. This article incorporates text from this source, which is in the public domain.
- ——— (1861c). Life of Andrew Jackson. Vol. III.
- Patterson, C. Perry (February 1, 1922). The Negro in Tennessee, 1790–1865. Bulletin No. 2205. Austin, Texas: University of Texas. hdl:2152/60590. LCCN 22027264. OCLC 2472635. OL 6705760W. FHL 1987019. - Also digitized by Project Gutenberg - This article incorporates text from this source, which is in the public domain.
- Pessen, Edward (1985) [1969]. Jacksonian America: Society, Personality, and Politics (Rev. ed.). Urbana, Illinois: University of Illinois Press. ISBN 978-0-252-01237-2. LCCN 85001100. OCLC 11783430.
- Phelps, Dawson A. (January 1949). "Stands and Accomodations on the Natchez Trace". Journal of Mississippi History. XI (1). Jackson, Mississippi: Mississippi Historical Society in cooperation with the Mississippi Department of Archives and History: 1–54. ISSN 0022-2771. OCLC 1782329.
- ——— (July 1953). "Travel on the Natchez Trace: A Study of Its Economic Aspects". Journal of Mississippi History. 15 (3). Jackson, Mississippi: Mississippi Historical Society in cooperation with the Mississippi Department of Archives and History: 155–164. ISSN 0022-2771. OCLC 1782329.
- ———; Ross, Edward Hunter (October 1952). "Names Please: Place-Names Along on the Natchez Trace". Journal of Mississippi History. XIV (4). Jackson, Mississippi: Mississippi Historical Society in cooperation with the Mississippi Department of Archives and History: 217–256. ISSN 0022-2771. OCLC 1782329.
- Pinnen, Christian; Weeks, Charles A. (2021). Colonial Mississippi: A Borrowed Land. Heritage of Mississippi Series, Vol. VIII. Jackson, Mississippi: University Press of Mississippi for the Mississippi Historical Society and the Mississippi Department of Archives and History. ISBN 978-1-4968-3270-2. LCCN 2020051280. OCLC 1228912751. Project MUSE book 82844.
- Pratt, Julius W. (October 1945). "Aaron Burr and the Historians". New York History. 26 (4). Fenimore Art Museum. Cornell University Press: 447–470. ISSN 0146-437X. JSTOR 23149934.
- Porter, Kenneth W. (1971). The Negro on the American Frontier. The American Negro, His History and Literature. New York: Arno Press. ISBN 978-0-405-01983-8. LCCN 77135872. OCLC 153515.
- Powell, Susie V., ed. (1938). Jefferson County (PDF). Source Material for Mississippi History, Volume XXXII, Part I. WPA Statewide Historical Research Project – via Mississippi Library Commission (mlc.lib.ms.us). This article incorporates text from this source, which is in the public domain.
- Remini, Robert V. (1977). Andrew Jackson and the Course of American Empire, 1767–1821. New York: Harper & Row. ISBN 978-0-8018-5912-0. LCCN 77003766. OCLC 1145801830.
- ——— (1988). The Legacy of Andrew Jackson: Essays on Democracy, Indian Removal, and Slavery. The Walter Lynwood Fleming Lectures in Southern History. Baton Rouge: Louisiana State University Press. ISBN 978-0-8071-1407-0. LCCN 87024137. OCLC 16685223.
- ——— (Summer 1991). "Andrew Jackson's Adventures on the Natchez Trace". Southern Quarterly. 29 (4). Hattiesburg, Mississippi: University of Southern Mississippi: 35–42. ISSN 0038-4496. OCLC 1644229.
- ——— (Spring 1995). "Andrew Jackson Takes an Oath of Allegiance to Spain". Tennessee Historical Quarterly. 54 (1). Loyalty oath document surfaced by Dr. G. Douglas Inglis of Seville, Spain. Nashville, Tennessee: Tennessee Historical Society: 2–15. ISSN 0040-3261. JSTOR 42628387. OCLC 551288487.
- Robinson, Dan M. (Fall 1967). "Robert Hays, Unsung Pioneer of the Cumberland Country". Tennessee Historical Quarterly. 26 (3): 263–278. ISSN 0040-3261. JSTOR 42622953.
- Rogin, Michael Paul (1975). Fathers and Children: Andrew Jackson and the Subjugation of the American Indian. New York: Alfred A. Knopf. ISBN 978-0-3944-8204-0. LCCN 74021310. OCLC 1111310.
- Rothman, Adam (2005). Slave Country: American Expansion and the Origins of the Deep South. Harvard University Press. doi:10.4159/9780674042919. ISBN 978-0-674-04291-9. LCCN 2004057658. OCLC 56191767.
- Rowland, Dunbar (1935). Courts, Judges, and Lawyers of Mississippi, 1798–1935. Jackson, Mississippi: Printed for the State Department of Archives and History and the Mississippi Historical Society. pp. 16–18. LCCN 36028118. OCLC 2124426. OL 6796145W – via HathiTrust.
- Rowland, Mrs. Dunbar (1910). "Marking the Natchez Trace: An Historic Highway of the Lower South". Publications of the Mississippi Historical Society. XI: 345–361. hdl:2027/mdp.39015039482057. ISSN 0885-792X. OCLC 5110834 – via HathiTrust. This article incorporates text from this source, which is in the public domain.
- ——— (1921). "Mississippi Territory in the War of 1812". Publications of the Mississippi Historical Society. Centenary Series. IV: 7–233. hdl:2027/nyp.33433081900437. ISSN 0885-792X. OCLC 5110834 – via HathiTrust. This article incorporates text from this source, which is in the public domain.
- Satz, Ronald N. (1979). "Carey Allen Harris, 1836–38". In Kvasnicka, Robert M.; Viola, Herman J. (eds.). The Commissioners of Indian Affairs, 1824–1977. Lincoln: University of Nebraska Press. pp. 17–22. ISBN 978-0-8032-2700-2. LCCN 79012336. OCLC 4857939 – via Internet Archive.
- Saunt, Claudio (2020). Unworthy Republic: The Dispossession of Native Americans and the Road to Indian Territory. New York: W. W. Norton & Company. ISBN 978-0-393-60984-4. LCCN 2019050502. OCLC 1102470806.
- Schermerhorn, Calvin (2016). "Chapter 10. The Coastwise Slave Trade and a Mercantile Community of Interest". In Rockman, Seth Edward; Beckert, Sven (eds.). Slavery's Capitalism: A New History of American Economic Development. Early American Studies. Philadelphia: University of Pennsylvania Press. pp. 209–224. doi:10.9783/9780812293098-011. ISBN 978-0-8122-4841-8. JSTOR j.ctt1dfnrs7. LCCN 2016304619. OCLC 945028802.
- Sellers, Charles Grier Jr. (March 1958). "Andrew Jackson Versus the Historians". The Mississippi Valley Historical Review. 44 (4). Urbana, Illinois: Mississippi Valley Historical Association: 615–634. doi:10.2307/1886599. ISSN 2326-2028. JSTOR 1886599. OCLC 35781793.
- Stearns, Susan Gaunt (2024). "7. Cotton and the Americanization of Natchez". Empire of Commerce: The Closing of the Mississippi and the Opening of Atlantic Trade. Jeffersonian America. Charlottesville, Virginia: University of Virginia Press. doi:10.2307/jj.13840496. ISBN 978-0-8139-5125-6. JSTOR jj.13840496. LCCN 2023052273. OCLC 1417600570. Project MUSE book 124327.
- Stewart, David O. (2011). American Emperor: Aaron Burr's Challenge to Jefferson's America. New York: Simon and Schuster. ISBN 978-1-4391-6032-9. LCCN 2011002647. OCLC 892924831.
- Snow, Whitney Adrienne (2008). "Slave Owner, Slave Trader, Gentleman: Slavery and the Rise of Andrew Jackson" (PDF). Journal of East Tennessee History. 80. Knoxville, Tennessee: East Tennessee Historical Society: 47–59. ISSN 1058-2126. OCLC 23044540.
- Sydnor, Charles S. (1933). Slavery in Mississippi. American Historical Association, Carnegie Corporation of New York. New York: D. Appleton-Century Co. LCCN 33033678. OCLC 1968805.
- Tadman, Michael (1996a) [1989]. Speculators and Slaves: Masters, Traders, and Slaves in the Old South. Madison, Wisconsin: University of Wisconsin Press. ISBN 978-0-2991-1854-9. LCCN 89040269. OCLC 34825947.
- ——— (1996b). "The Hidden History of Slave Trading in Antebellum South Carolina: John Springs III and Other 'Gentlemen Dealing in Slaves'". The South Carolina Historical Magazine. 97 (1): 6–29. ISSN 0038-3082. JSTOR 27570133.
- ——— (September 2007). "The Reputation of the Slave Trader in Southern History and the Social Memory of the South". American Nineteenth Century History. 8 (3): 247–271. doi:10.1080/14664650701505117. ISSN 1466-4658.
- Toplovich, Ann (Winter 2005). "Marriage, Mayhem, and Presidential Politics: The Robards–Jackson Backcountry Scandal" (PDF). Ohio Valley History. 5 (4). Cincinnati, Ohio & Louisville, Kentucky: Cincinnati Museum Center & Filson Historical Society: 3–22. ISSN 2377-0600. OCLC 1332991166. Project MUSE 572973.
- Usner, Daniel H. (September 1985). "American Indians on the Cotton Frontier: Changing Economic Relations with Citizens and Slaves in the Mississippi Territory". The Journal of American History. 72 (2). Organization of American Historians: 297–317. doi:10.2307/1903377. ISSN 0021-8723. JSTOR 1903377.
- Watson, Samuel (2010). "7. Seminole Strategy, 1812–1858: A Prospectus for Further Research". pp. 155–180. doi:10.5744/florida/9780813035253.003.0007. in Belko 2010.
- Watson, Thomas Edward (1912). The Life and Times of Andrew Jackson. Press of the Jeffersonian Publishing Company. LCCN 14003722. OCLC 3218913. This article incorporates text from this source, which is in the public domain.
- Weeks, Charles A. (July 2010). "Of Rattlesnakes, Wolves, and Tigers: A Harangue at the Chickasaw Bluffs, 1796". The William and Mary Quarterly. 67 (3). Williamsburg, Virginia: Omohundro Institute of Early American History and Culture: 487–518. doi:10.5309/willmaryquar.67.3.487. ISSN 0043-5597. JSTOR 10.5309/willmaryquar.67.3.487. OCLC 1607858.
- Whitaker, A. P. (September 1925). "Spanish Intrigue in the Old Southwest: An Episode, 1788–89". The Mississippi Valley Historical Review. 12 (2). Organization of American Historians. Oxford University Press: 155–176. doi:10.2307/1886510. ISSN 0161-391X. JSTOR 1886510.
- White, Alice Pemble (April 1944). "The Plantation Experience of Joseph and Lavinia Erwin, 1807–1836". Louisiana Historical Quarterly. XXVII (2). Cabildo, New Orleans: Louisiana Historical Society: 343–477. ISSN 0095-5949 – via Internet Archive.
- WPA Federal Writers' Project (1938). Mississippi: A Guide to the Magnolia State. American Guide Series. Mississippi Advertising Commission. New York: The Viking Press. LCCN 38012400. OCLC 813029. OL 6369720M. This article incorporates text from this source, which is in the public domain.
- ——— (1939). Tennessee: A Guide to the Volunteer State. American Guide Series. Tennessee Department of Conservation, Division of Information. New York: The Viking Press. LCCN 49005822. OCLC 751379. OL 6046937M. This article incorporates text from this source, which is in the public domain.

=== Primary sources ===
- Blackman, Learner (September 1953). Phelps, Dawson A. (ed.). "The Diary of a Chaplain in Andrew Jackson's Army: The Journal of the Reverend Mr. Learner Blackman. December 28, 1812 – April 4, 1813". Tennessee Historical Quarterly. 12 (3): 264–281. ISSN 0040-3261. JSTOR 42621154.
- Brown, W. Wells (1847). Narrative of William W. Brown, a Fugitive Slave. Boston: The Anti-Slavery Office. hdl:loc.gdc/scd0001.00118369671. LCCN 14004708. OCLC 2382316. OL 16611228W. – Also digitized by UNC's Documenting the American South project.
- Buckner, Philip; McGroarty, William Buckner (July 1926). "Diary of Captain Philip Buckner". The William and Mary College Quarterly Historical Magazine. VI (3): 173–207. doi:10.2307/1921270. ISSN 1936-9530. JSTOR 1921270.
- Carr, John (1958) [1857]. Early Times in Middle Tennessee (Original publisher E. Stevenson & F. A. Owens for E. Carr) (Reprint ed.). Nashville, Tennessee: The Parthenon Press. LCCN rc01001286. OCLC 400755. OL 1618646W. FHL 180629 – via HathiTrust.
- Carter, Clarence Edwin, ed. (1937). Volume V: The Territory of Mississippi, 1798–1817. The Territorial Papers of the United States. Washington, D.C.: U.S. Government Printing Office. Publication No. 1032 (E173 147) – via HathiTrust; digitized by Google Books from a copy held by the University of California Libraries.
- Forman, Maj. Samuel S.; Draper, Lyman C. (1888). Narrative of a Journey Down the Ohio and Mississippi in 1789–90. Cincinnati: R. Clarke & Co. hdl:loc.gdc/scd0001.00144977178. LCCN 03014069. OCLC 1700028.
- Gillis, Norman; Gillis, Irene S. (n.d.). Early Inhabitants of the Natchez District. [Per LOC, possibly published 1963]. Shreveport, Louisiana. LCCN 64002728. OCLC 732676231. FHL 153410.
- Gosnold, Flora Bullen (1968). "V. His Journals". Genealogy and Work of Rev. Joseph Bullen Jr. and Some Associated Families. Hickory, North Carolina: n.pub. pp. 45–75. OCLC 10736209. FHL 2660135. (Another copy)
- Hildreth, Dr. S. P. (March 1842). Williams, John S. (ed.). "History of an Early Voyage on the Ohio and Mississippi Rivers, with Historical Sketches of the Different Points Along Them, &c, &c". The American Pioneer. I (3). Logan Historical Society. Cincinnati, Ohio: R. P. Brooks: 89–145 – via Internet Archive, Allen County Public Library Genealogy Center.
- Jackson, Andrew IV (n.d.). Andrew Jackson, President of the United States of America. Los Angeles: n.pub. hdl:loc.gdc/52042142. LCCN 52042142. OCLC 10750833.
- Jones, J. G. (1866). A Concise History of the Introduction of Protestantism into Mississippi and the Southwest. St. Louis: P. M. Pinckard. LCCN 38030650. OCLC 7595041. OL 18044825W.
- Kendall, Amos (1843). Life of Andrew Jackson: Private, Military, and Civil. New York: Harper. LCCN unk82057243. OCLC 13369195.
- Lundy, Benjamin, ed. (July 28, 1827). "General Jackson". The Genius of Universal Emancipation, or American Anti-Slavery Journal, and Register of News. Vol. VII, no. 144. Baltimore, Maryland: Microfilmed by Open Court Publishing Co. p. 30. New series, No. 4, Vol. I – via Internet Archive.
- ———, ed. (July 19, 1828). "Jackson Again". The Genius of Universal Emancipation. Vol. VIII, no. 206. p. 178. New series, No. 22, Vol. II.
- McBee, May Wilson (1953). The Natchez Court Records, 1767–1805: Abstracts of Early Records. Ann Arbor, Michigan: Edwards Brothers, Inc. – via Internet Archive, digitized from a copy held at the Allen County Public Library Genealogy Center in Fort Wayne, Indiana.
- Minor, Stephen (October 1953). "A Journey Over the Natchez Trace in 1792: A Document from the Archives of Spain". Journal of Mississippi History. 15 (4). Translated by Ross, Edward Hunter; Phelps, Dawson A. Jackson, Mississippi: Mississippi Historical Society in cooperation with the Mississippi Department of Archives and History: 252–273. ISSN 0022-2771. OCLC 1782329.
- Mississippi Department of Archives and History (1905). Rowland, Dunbar (ed.). The Mississippi Territorial Archives, Volume I: Executive Journals of Governor Winthrop Sargent and Governor William Charles Cole Claiborne (1798–1803). Nashville, Tennessee: Brandon Printing Co. LCCN 06016714. OCLC 2962449.
- Rainwater, P. L. (September 1934). "The Autobiography of Benjamin Grubb Humphreys (August 26, 1808 – December 20, 1882)". The Mississippi Valley Historical Review. 21 (2). Organization of American Historians. Oxford University Press: 231–255. doi:10.2307/1896893. ISSN 0161-391X. JSTOR 1896893. OCLC 1776316.
- Roberts, J. (1945) [1858]. The Narrative of James Roberts, Soldier in the Revolutionary War and at the Battle of New Orleans. Heartman's Historical Series No. 71. Hattiesburg, Mississippi: The Book Farm. LCCN 45009855. OCLC 1381602. – Also digitized by UNC's Documenting the American South project.
- Ross, Harvey Lee (1899). The Early Pioneers and Pioneer Events of the State of Illinois Including Personal Recollections of the Writer of Abraham Lincoln, Andrew Jackson and Peter Cartwright, Together With a Brief Autobiography of the Writer. Chicago: Eastman Brothers. LCCN 09030102. OCLC 181327605. OL 7013514M – via HathiTrust.
- Ruffner, Henry (April 1839). "Notes of a Tour from Virginia to Tennessee in the Months of July and August 1838, Chapter IV". Southern Literary Messenger. 5 (4): 269–273 – via Making of America Journal Articles, University of Michigan Library Digital Collections.
- Sparks, W. H. (1870). The Memories of Fifty Years: Containing Brief Biographical Notes of Distinguished Americans and Anecdotes of Remarkable Men. Philadelphia: Claxton, Remsen & Haffelfinger. hdl:loc.gdc/scd0001.00100906478. LCCN 06005624. OCLC 1048818176. OL 23365380M – via HathiTrust, copy digitized by Library of Congress.
- Speer, William S. (1888). Sketches of Prominent Tennesseans: Containing Biographies and Records of Many of the Families who Have Attained Prominence in Tennessee. Nashville: A. B. Tavel. LCCN 08019465. OCLC 4252171. OL 6998321M.
- Watkins, W. H., ed. (n.d.). Some Interesting Facts of the Early History of Jefferson County, Mississippi. Includes a biography of John A. Watkins by R. S. Albert, two previously published articles by John A. Watkins, and one previously published article by V. N. Russell. n.pub. OCLC 17887012. F347.J42 W3 – via University of Mississippi Libraries Special Collections, Oxford, Mississippi.
- Watson, Henry (1848). Narrative of Henry Watson, a Fugitive Slave. Boston: Bela Marsh. hdl:loc.rbc/rbaapc.32910. LCCN 92838849. OCLC 13167971. – Also digitized by UNC's Documenting the American South project.
- Weld, Theodore Dwight; Grimké, Angelina; Grimké, Sarah Moore (1839). American Slavery As It Is: Testimony of a Thousand Witnesses. American Anti-Slavery Society. New York: Published by the American Anti-Slavery Society, office, no. 143 Nassau Street. LCCN 11008377. OCLC 14906369. OL 20509019M.

=== A. Jackson documents ===
- Various; Jackson, Andrew (1926). Bassett, John Spencer (ed.). Correspondence of Andrew Jackson, Volume I, to April 30, 1814. Carnegie Institution of Washington Papers of the Historical Research Department No. 371. Baltimore, Maryland: The Lord Baltimore Press. LCCN 26007292. OCLC 2533564 – via HathiTrust. This article incorporates text from this source, which is in the public domain.
- ———; ——— (1928). Bassett, John Spencer (ed.). Correspondence of Andrew Jackson, Volume III, 1820–1828. Carnegie Papers No. 371, Vol. III. Carnegie institution of Washington – via HathiTrust.
- ———; ——— (1931). Bassett, John Spencer (ed.). Correspondence of Andrew Jackson, Volume V, 1833–1838. Carnegie Papers No. 371, Vol. V. Preface by J. Franklin Jameson. Carnegie institution of Washington – via HathiTrust.
- ———; ——— (1933). Bassett, John Spencer (ed.). Correspondence of Andrew Jackson, Volume VI, 1839–1845. Carnegie Papers No. 371, Vol. VI. Preface by J. Franklin Jameson. Carnegie institution of Washington – via HathiTrust.
- Jackson, Andrew (1980). Smith, Sam B.; Owsley, Harriet Chappell; Moser, Harold D. (eds.). The Papers of Andrew Jackson, Volume I, 1770–1803. Knoxville: University of Tennessee Press. doi:10.7290/utp7943. ISBN 978-0-8704-9219-8. LCCN 79015078. OCLC 5029597.
- ——— (1984). Moser, Harold D.; MacPherson, Sharon (eds.). The Papers of Andrew Jackson, Volume II, 1804–1813. University of Tennessee Press. doi:10.7290/utp3038. ISBN 978-0-8704-9441-3.
- ——— (1991). Moser, Harold D.; Hoth, David R.; MacPherson, Sharon; Reinbold, John H. (eds.). The Papers of Andrew Jackson, Volume III, 1814–1815. University of Tennessee Press. doi:10.7290/utp9085. ISBN 978-0-87049-650-9.
- ——— (1994). Moser, Harold D.; Hoth, David R.; Hoemann, George H. (eds.). The Papers of Andrew Jackson, Volume IV, 1816–1820. University of Tennessee Press. doi:10.7290/utp8684. ISBN 978-0-8704-9219-8.
- ——— (2002). Moser, Harold D.; Clifft, J. Clint; Wells, Wyatt (eds.). The Papers of Andrew Jackson, Volume VI, 1825–1828. University of Tennessee Press. doi:10.7290/utp7151. ISBN 978-1-5723-3174-7.

=== Campaign materials ===
- An Association of Individuals (1828). Hammond, Charles (ed.). Truth's Advocate and Monthly Anti-Jackson Expositor. Cincinnati, Ohio: Lodge, L'Hommedieu, and Hammond. hdl:2027/nyp.33433115687075. LCCN 10011988. OCLC 909227829. OL 22895763M. Sabin 97272; ULS V, p. 4270.
- Erwin, Andrew (1828). Gen. Jackson's Negro Speculations, and His Traffic in Human Flesh, Examined and Established by Positive Proof. n.pub. hdl:loc.gdc/scd0001.00118965036. LCCN 11017861. OCLC 1045598189. OL 6532737M. Shoemaker 33082. Wikidata Q19042847.
- Erwin, Andrew; McNairy, Boyd; Greene, H.; Weakley, R.; Blythe, S. K.; Tannehill, Wilkins (1828). A Brief Account of General Jackson's Dealings in Negroes in a Series of Letters and Documents by His Own Neighbors. [National Republican Party of New York State]. Tennessee State Library and Archives E376 .N33.
- McNairy, Boyd (July 14, 1828). Jackson a negro trader. From the Nashville Banner and Whig. To the public (Broadside). Nashville, Tennessee. LCCN 2020772160 – via Library of Congress Digital.
- Snelling, W. Joseph (1831). A Brief and Impartial History of the Life and Actions of Andrew Jackson, President of the United States, by A Free Man. Boston: Stimpson and Clapp. hdl:loc.gdc/scd0001.00118962965. LCCN 11021109. OCLC 1114508. OL 22862330M.

=== Unpublished theses ===
- Menck, Mary (May 2017). The Devil's Backbone: Race, Space, and Nation-Building on the Natchez Trace (M.A. thesis). Medford, Massachusetts: Tufts University.
- Morris, Christopher C. (1991). Town and Country in the Old South: Vicksburg and Warren County, Mississippi, 1770–1860 (Ph.D. thesis). University of Florida Digital Collections. OCLC 46939976.
- Pinnen, Christian (May 2012). Slavery and Empire: The Development of Slavery in the Natchez District, 1720–1820 (Ph.D. thesis). Hattiesburg, Mississippi: University of Southern Mississippi. 821.
- Smith, Lee Davis (August 2004). A Settlement of Great Consequence: The Development of the Natchez District, 1763–1860 (M.A. thesis). Baton Rouge, Louisiana: Louisiana State University. 2133.
- Wohl, Michael S. (July 1984). A Man in Shadow: The Life of Daniel Clark (Ph.D. thesis). New Orleans: Tulane University. OCLC 23944928.

=== Interdisciplinary perspectives ===
- Bumgardner, Georgia Brady (Autumn 1986). "Political Portraiture: Two Prints of Andrew Jackson". American Art Journal. XVIII (4). New York: Kennedy Galleries: 84–95. doi:10.2307/1594466. ISSN 0002-7359. JSTOR 1594466.
- Stephens, Rachel (2018). Selling Andrew Jackson: Ralph E. W. Earl and the Politics of Portraiture. Columbia, South Carolina: University of South Carolina Press. ISBN 978-1-6111-7867-8. LCCN 2017041622. OCLC 1023818256. Project MUSE book 59054.

=== Kinship networks ===
- Caffery, Charles S. (n.d.). The Caffery Family, 1737–1900 (PDF). n.pub. OCLC 15049793.
- Dilley, Ora Iona (1986). History and Genealogy of the Greens, Carpenters, Dilleys, Ushers. Vicksburg, Mississippi: Self-published typescript. OCLC 18666244. FHL 3461497 – via LDS Family History Library from a copy at the Dallas Public Library.
- Headley, Katy McCaleb (n.d.). MacKillop (McCaleb) Clan of Scotland and the United States. Vol. I. Descendants of Captain William and Ann (Mackey) McCaleb. Publication date before 1965, likely 1964. Chillicothe, Missouri: Self-published typescript by Elizabeth Prather Ellsberry. OCLC 866105689. FHL Film 876563, DGS 7831231.
- Patton, J. (1850). Biography of James Patton. Asheville, North Carolina: n.pub. OCLC 46452157. OL 25397531M – via HathiTrust. – Also digitized by UNC's Documenting the American South project.
- Short, Aimee Jackson (1960). Jackson–Taylor and Related Families. Dallas: Royal Pub. Co. LCCN 61001975. OCLC 609246618. OL 5817251M.
- Stephenson, Mrs. J. P. (1922). "Donaldson–Donelson". In Armstrong, Zella (ed.). Notable Southern Families. Vol. II. Chattanooga, Tennessee: The Lookout Publishing Co. pp. 87–127. LCCN 18019145. OCLC 1037236047. OL 23416064M – via HathiTrust, digitized by Google Books from a copy at Harvard University Libraries.

=== Online ===
- Historic American Buildings Survey (1933). "West Cabin, 4580 Rachel's Lane, Hermitage, Davidson County, TN" – via Library of Congress Digital.
- Historic American Buildings Survey (1933). "East Cabin, 4580 Rachel's Lane, Hermitage, Davidson County, TN". The Library of Congress – via Library of Congress Digital.
