= Malcolm Gilchrist =

Malcolm Gilchrist may refer to:

- Malcolm Gilchrist (1744–1821), North Carolina politician
- Malcolm Gilchrist (1776–1851), Mississippi politician
- Malcolm Gilchrist (1786–1845), American land speculator
