= Malcolm Gilchrist (speculator) =

Capitalist active U.S. South (1786–1845)

- Born: October 6, 1786; Moore County, North Carolina, United States
- Died: June 17, 1845 (aged 58); Hardin County, Tennessee
- Occupations: Land speculator, cotton shipping, lawyer
- Known for: Surveyed and resold land that had recently been transferred to U.S. governments title from the Cherokee, Chickasaw, and Choctaw

Malcolm Gilchrist (October 6, 1786–June 17, 1845) was an American land speculator who surveyed and resold land that had recently been transferred to U.S. governments title from the Cherokee, Chickasaw, and Choctaw. He also ran a cotton freighting business and managed the shipments south to New Orleans via the Tennessee River. He seems to have also worked as a lawyer. During the 1828 U.S. presidential election Gilchrist was accused of participating in a politically motivated assault on a physician who was pamphleteering against Andrew Jackson's candidacy.

== Early life ==
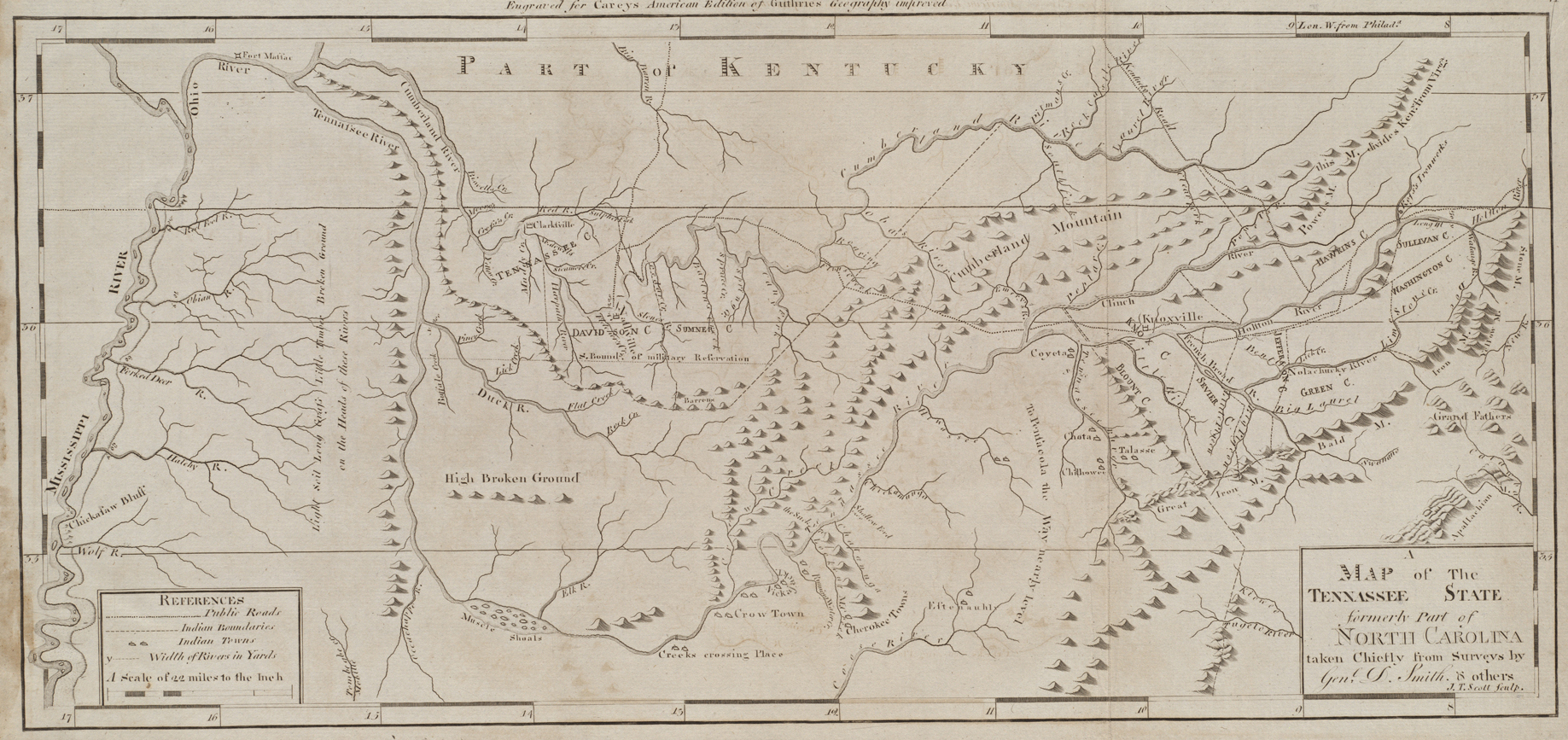
"A map of the Tennassee state formerly part of North Carolina taken chiefly from surveys by Genl. D. Smith and others," by Mathew Carey (1800)

Malcolm Gilchrist was the third son of Catherine Buie and Malcolm Gilchrist Sr., a North Carolina state legislator who moved to Tennessee in the first decade of the 19th century. He was born in Moore County, North Carolina where his father had first settled after migrating from Scotland. Gilchrist Sr. and Thomas Overton (brother of judge John Overton) had represented Moore County in the North Carolina state legislature throughout the 1790s. The family relocated to Maury County, Tennessee in 1809. Around 1818, William Gilchrist, Malcolm Gilchrist's brother, trained a young Tennessean named Archibald Yell in the law (despite Yell's previously limited education), and they later became law partners.

Also in the late 1810s the Gilchrists were involved in surveying northern Alabama. An 1818 letter from John Coffee, who had been appointed surveyor general for the land south of Tennessee, explained that Daniel Gilchrist (another of Malcolm's brothers) had been hired to resurvey an important boundary line in northern Alabama. According to Clarence E. Carter, editor of The Territorial Papers of the United States, Malcolm Gilchrist was one of a number of men who were irregularly hired to survey tracts along the Tennessee River in northern Alabama, beginning in 1817:

"There are no surveying contracts extant for Alabama Territory which supply data on the specific tract or tracts to be surveyed, nor the time within which the work should be completed as in the case, for example, of Michigan Territory. Cf. Terr. Papers (Mich.), X, 527–530. Apparently the surveyors operated under informal instructions from the surveyor general. As for Freeman's district, in southern Alabama, no contracts of any kind have been uncovered. A comparison of the above form with all others issued and signed by Coffee for the years 1817 to 1819 inclusive discloses no textual deviations."

== Boatman and cotton freighter ==
Gilchrist was a cotton freighter. According to Donald Davidson's history of the Tennessee River, "For his hands, he employed the adventurous young men of the region, who were only too eager to make the New Orleans trip and were satisfied with low wages."

According to Saunders and Stubbs in Early Settlers of Alabama (1899):

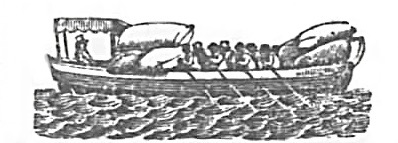
Woodcut etching of a Tennessee cotton boat, 1829

A few men like Malcolm Gilchrist, who had the confidence of the planters and capital enough, would purchase a goodly number of boats and would employ for each one a steersman, and commonly four more to work the oars, when necessary. As fast as the boats were loaded, they were one by one passed under the care of a pilot through the Shoals, the pilot returning from Bainbridge for another trip. The first pilot was...Melton, after whom Melton's Bluff was named...The price of freight to New Orleans was $1 per 100 pounds, and the cotton-freighter reaped a rich harvest. Gilchrist would require his steersmen to write to him at several points on the Mississippi river and when his last boat was loaded he would take passage on it to New Orleans to collect his freights from the commission merchants, and return by steamer to Memphis, and thence home by stage coach." The boatmen walked back home 'through the Choctaw and Chickasaw nations'.

James Melton, a bicultural man who was the son of a Cherokee woman and John Melton who lent his name to Melton's Bluff, "worked mainly for Malcolm Gilchrist who settled near Melton's Bluff before Alabama became a state" and was "the 'Commodore Vanderbilt' of the lower Tennessee River. He owned a fleet of flatboats that plied the river from Muscle Shoals to New Orleans and made himself quite a fortune."

== Surveying, land speculation, and planting ==
Malcolm Gilchrist was granted surveying contracts on August 4, 1817, and April 7, 1818. Several were also granted to relatives of Andrew Jackson and John Coffee (William Donelson, John Donelson, John Hutchings, Thomas Hutchings), and to Jackson's aides-de-camp (William P. Anderson, Thomas L. Butler). Another Alabama Territory contract surveyor was Isham G. Searcy, who would be deemed part of the Jackson-affiliated "land-office faction" in territorial Florida.

Malcolm Gilchrist was resident in Lawrence County, Alabama by 1824. According to the application to the National Register of Historic Places for Alabama's Courtland Historic District, most of the early settlers in the area were originally Piedmont Virginians or North Carolinians, including the "Gilchrist family, third-generation Scots from Moore County...through the shrewd foresight of Malcolm Gilchrist, a surveyor of Federal lands in the Tennessee Valley, the family acquired some of the most productive cotton acreage in the Courtland area at a very early date, soon establishing themselves as among the first citizens of the county." James Edward Saunders dedicated two pages to the Gilchrists in his Early Settlers of Alabama, including using Malcolm Gilchrist's career as the basis for an unusually frank summary of the early American land business:

Malcolm and Daniel moved to this country at an early day and settled near Melton's Bluff. Malcolm was a surveyor and a land dealer, as all surveyors have been since the days of Washington. He did a good deal in this line in Tennessee before he left it. There the country was a cane brake when his father came to Maury county, and the mode of proceeding was to purchase land warrants, and then survey tracts on which to locate them. In Alabama the mode was a very different one. So much confusion had resulted from each holder surveying for himself, that the general Government employed public surveyors, who first divided the land into townships and then subdivided it into sections, which were sold at auction, the minimum price being fixed at $1.25 per acre. Then a new manœuvre was invented by the land buyers. A mammoth company (we would call it now a syndicate) was formed, and every acre of Uncle Sam's land offered for sale was purchased at the minimum price. Then the company would sell it at public auction, and energetic men, like Malcolm Gilchrist, who had been carefully examining the lands for weeks before the sales, would reap large profits by reselling the lands they would purchase to planters.

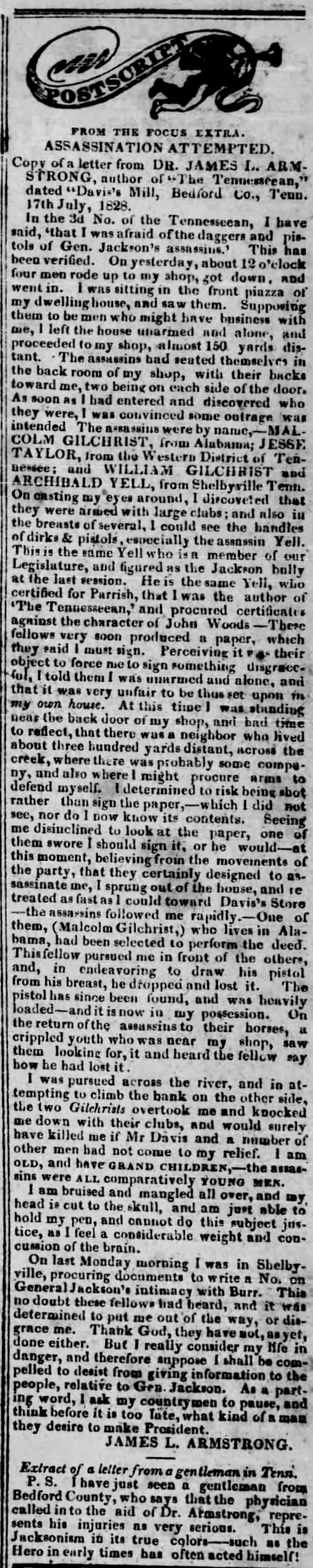
"Assassination Attempted," Kentucky Reporter, 1828

In July 1828, in the thick of the 1828 U.S. presidential election between Andrew Jackson and John Quincy Adams, Malcolm Gilchrist "of Alabama," William Gilchrist and Archibald Yell from Shelbyville, and Jesse Taylor from "the Western District of Tennessee," were involved in the beating of a Bedford County man named Dr. James Armstrong. Armstrong was the author of a pamphlet itemizing Andrew Jackson's predilection for violence. According to the editor of the Kentucky Reporter of Lexington, the beating was because they had identified Armstrong as the Tennesseean who had been writing anti-Jackson columns. According to a 20th-century profile of Yell, who was elected to be the second Governor of Arkansas in the 1840s, Nashville, Tennessee newspapers claimed the beating was because Armstrong had insulted Gilchrist's father by describing him as a Tory (Revolutionary-era British sympathizer). Both accounts agreed that the men wanted Gilchrist to sign a paper disclaiming his previous statements, whatever they may have been, and that Malcolm Gilchrist had repeatedly clubbed Armstrong. The Nashville paper claimed the beating was with a hickory stick. The Lexington paper reported that Gilchrist and the others had also been brandishing pistols, and in the fracas Malcolm Gilchrist dropped his pistol and when recovered by Armstrong's neighbors it was found to have been "heavily loaded". Armstrong also claimed that the force of the blows to the head "cut to the skull." Accounts of the incident appeared in newspapers nationwide.

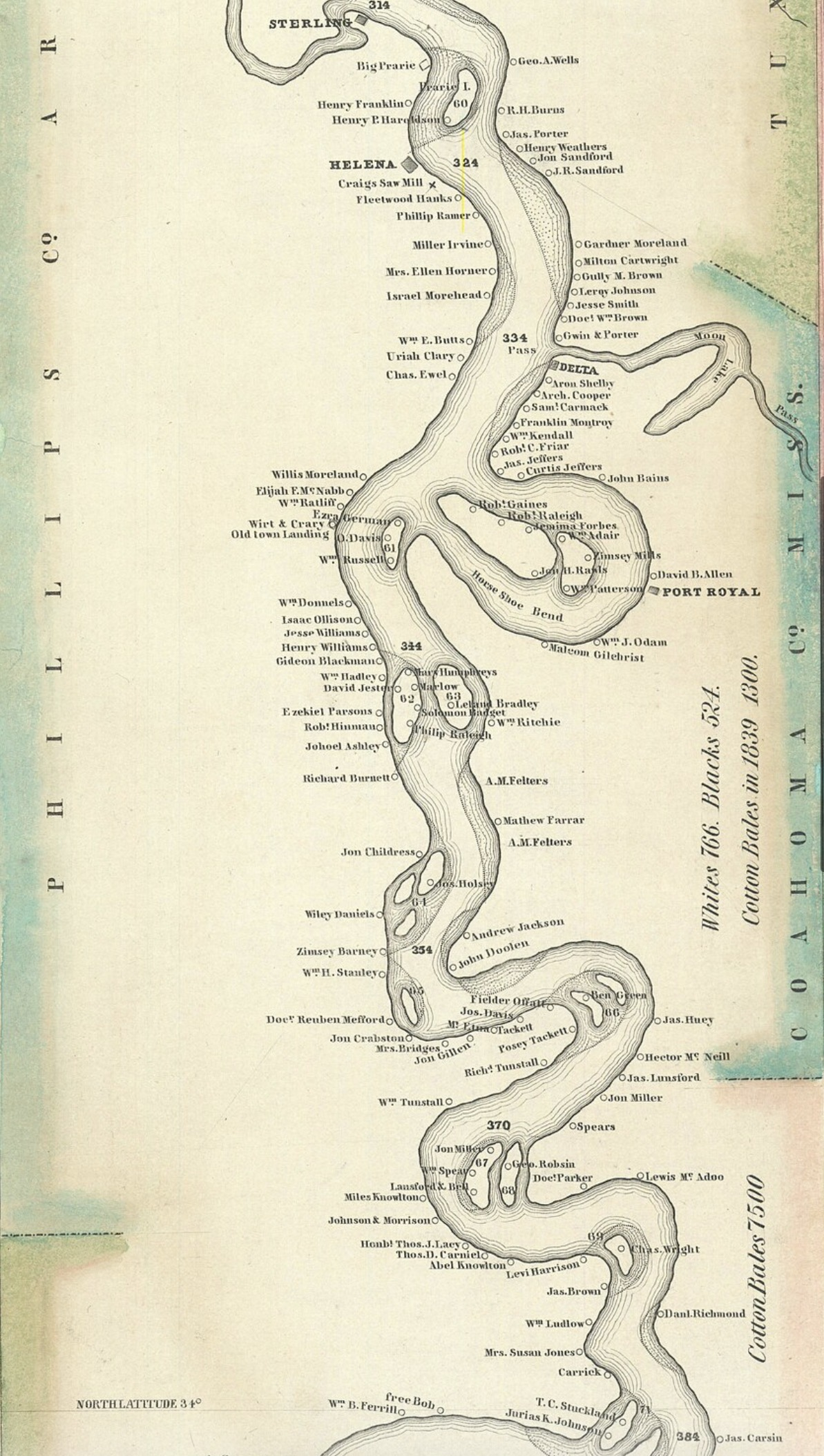
Circa 1840, Gilchrist, Andrew Jackson and his son, Gwin & Porter (probably Wm. M. Gwin or Samuel Gwin and Thomas J. Porter, the vendor behind this map), and a lone Black slave owner known only as Free Bob all had plantations along the same stretch of the Mississippi River

In the 1830s, Malcolm Gilchrist trained Yell's son James Yell to be a lawyer. According to a biography of James Yell published in the 1880s, he read law under Gilchrist, "one of the most prominent jurists of Tennessee. Induced by his uncle, Col. Archibald Yell, he moved to Arkansas in March, 1838, settling in Pine Bluff, where he began his remarkable career at the bar." Malcolm Gilchrist's brother William Gilchrist was assigned power of attorney by another lawyer, Wandering John Taylor, in Pulaski County, Arkansas Territory in December 1838. Taylor's biographer surmises that Wandering John had known the Gilchrists in Alabama before coming to Arkansas.

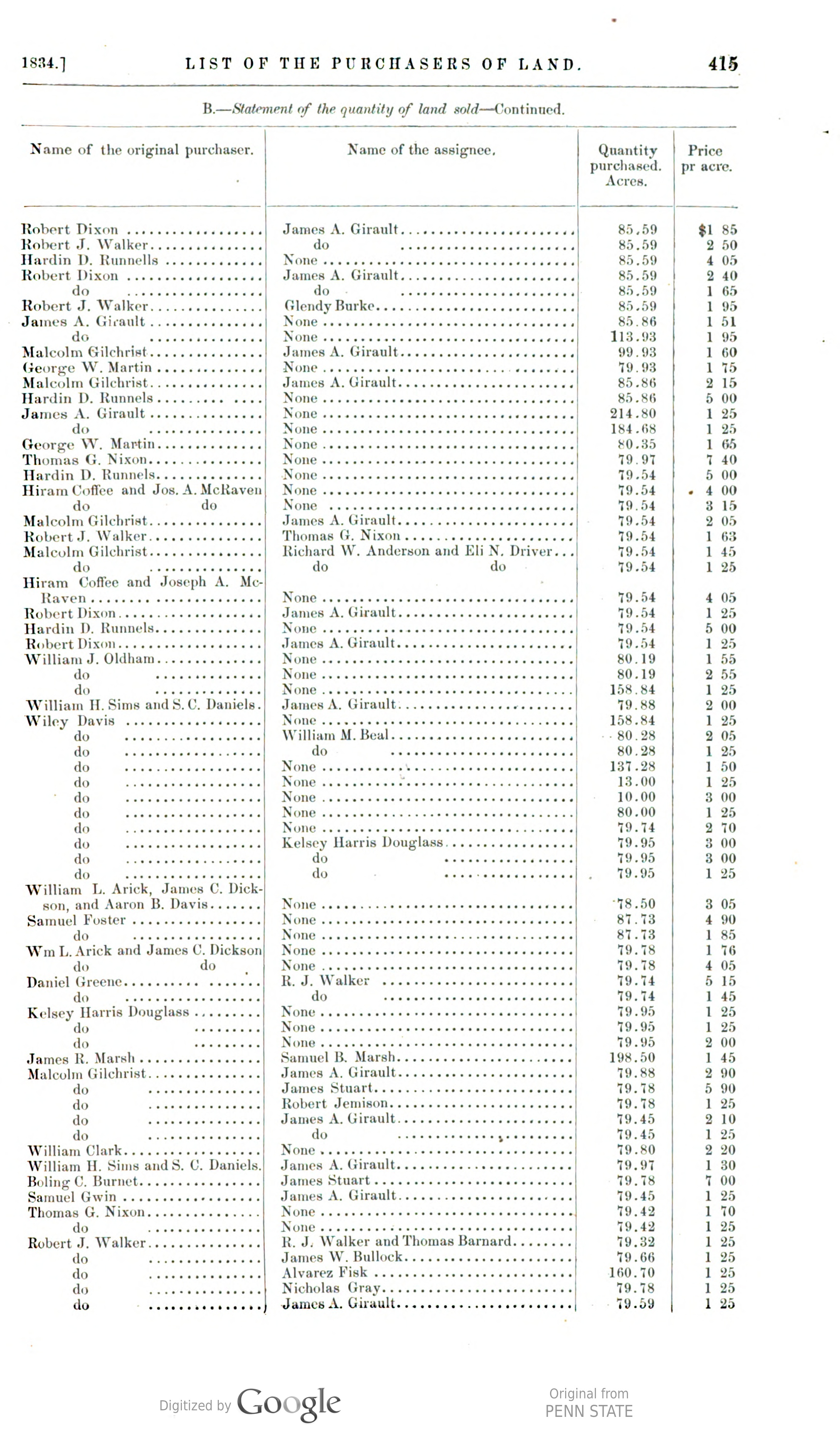
Statement of the quantity of land sold at the land office at Chocchuma, Mississippi, from the 1st October to the 31st December 1833, inclusive

Another place where Gilchrist worked as a land speculator was Chocchuma, Mississippi, where he was one of the four main buyers representing the Chocchuma Land Company, along with Robert Jameson, Thomas G. Ellis, and Robert J. Walker. (Walker was a future U.S. Senator from Mississippi and future Secretary of the Treasury.) A land office was opened at Chocchuma on the Yalobusha River to resell the territory that had been ceded to the U.S. government by the Choctaw under the 1830 Treaty of Dancing Rabbit Creek and by the Chickasaw under the 1832 Treaty of Pontotoc Creek. The syndicate buyers in Mississippi included many of the same people who had dominated Alabama land purchases in the 1810s. According to historian Claudio Saunt, the Chocchuma Land Company was one of the most powerful combinations at work in the Choctaw Nation, a secretive enterprise that revealed few details about itself to the public but was known to "composed of planters and other investors from Mississippi, Alabama, and Tennessee. Among them were several congressmen...Capitalized at between $50,000 and $300,000, it issued a corresponding number of thousand-dollar shares and purchased approximately 376 square miles from deportees in the 1830s. What the company lacked in financial capital, it made up for in local knowledge and in agents on the ground who could intimidate both indigenous landowners and white farmers who might bid against them." However, despite the syndicate's refined system, "The Chocchuma Company was unable to sell much of the land it had purchased in large tracts owing to its poor quality, location, and other undesirable features."

== Death and legacy ==
According to his obituary Gilchrist "was a native of N. Carolina, and emigrated to the west in early life poor, where, by labor and perseverance, he became a man of wealth. He was prized for his integrity and industry, and died as he had lived, an honest man, lamented by his relations and friends." He bequeathed his estate to the children of his brother Daniel.

== Sources ==
- n.a. (1889). Biographical and historical memoirs of Pulaski, Jefferson, Lonoke, Faulkner, Grant, Saline, Perry, Garland and Hot Spring counties, Arkansas: comprising a condensed history of the state. Chicago: Goodspeed Publishing Co.
- Carter, Clarence Edwin, ed. (1952). The Territorial Papers of the United States, Volume XVIII: The Territory of Alabama, 1817–1819. National Archives and Records Administration. Washington, D.C.: U.S. Government Printing Office. LCCN 35026191. OCLC 1157716. OL 8078771W. Publication No. 11-52.
- Chappell, Gordon T. (November 1949). "Some Patterns of Land Speculation in the Old Southwest". The Journal of Southern History. 15 (4): 463–477. doi:10.2307/2198383. JSTOR 2198383.
- Gamble, Robert; Betz, Melanie (January 1991). "Courtland (Alabama) Historic District". National Register of Historic Places. Alabama Historical Commission. National Park Service (nps.gov).
- Gates, Paul W. (November 1968). History of Public Land Law Development, Written for the U.S. States Public Land Law Review Commission. One chapter written by Robert W. Swenson. Washington, D.C.: U.S. Government Printing Office. LCCN 68062999. OCLC 453829.
- McDonald, William Lindsey (1995). "Melton's Bluff: Andrew Jackson's Cotton Plantation at the Muscle Shoals". Essays on the History of the Shoals from Pioneer Days to World War II. The Journal of Muscle Shoals History. 14. Sheffield, Alabama: Tennessee Valley Historical Society: 3–18. ISSN 0094-8039. OCLC 1795446.
- McLean, Angus Wilton; Purcell, John Edwin I; Singletary, Archibald Gilchrist; Purcell, John Edwin II (1942). Lumber River Scots and their Descendants; the McLeans, the Torreys, the Purcells, the McIntyres, the Gilchrists. Richmond: The William Byrd Press.
- Meek, Melinda (Spring 1967). "The Life of Archibald Yell – Chapter I: Early Life". The Arkansas Historical Quarterly. 26 (1): 11–23. doi:10.2307/40018963. JSTOR 40018963.
- Ross, Margaret (Autumn 1961). "Wandering John Taylor". The Arkansas Historical Quarterly. 20 (3): 207–226. doi:10.2307/40038047. JSTOR 40038047.
- Saunders, James Edmonds; Stubbs, Elizabeth Saunders Blair (1899). Early Settlers of Alabama. New Orleans: L. Graham & Son. LCCN rc01002465. OCLC 2660177.
- Saunt, Claudio (September 2019). "Financing Dispossession: Stocks, Bonds, and the Deportation of Native Peoples in the Antebellum United States". The Journal of American History. 106 (2): 315–337. doi:10.1093/jahist/jaz344. ISSN 0021-8723. JSTOR 48552369.
