= Samuel Gwin =

U.S. government clerk (1793–1838)

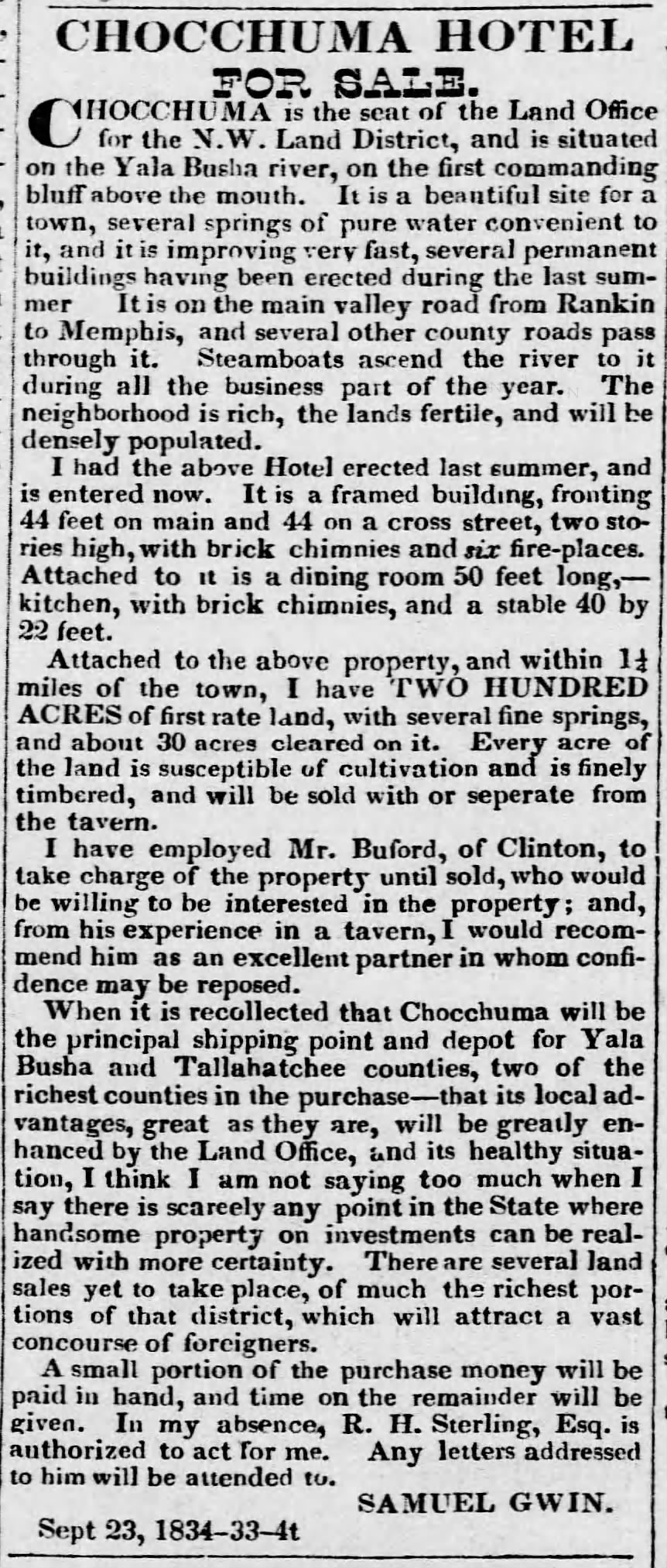
- Chocchuma hotel for sale, by Samuel Gwin (1834)
- Born: November 24, 1793; Tennessee
- Died: July 24, 1838 (aged 44); New Orleans, Louisiana

Samuel Gwin (November 24, 1793–July 24, 1838), often Col. Gwin, was a 19th-century United States government clerk and Mississippi political operative. President Andrew Jackson appointed him to work in the Post Office Department, and then at the United States General Land Office supervising sales of territory recently ceded by the Chickasaw and Choctaw in northwestern Mississippi. According to A New History of Mississippi (2014), Gwin and his brother William McKendree Gwin moved to the state from Tennessee and "held a variety of posts and operated the Regency, a new governing cabal, out of Vicksburg. Acting as Jackson's agents, they controlled federal patronage, ignored Mississippi's elected representatives, printed and distributed tracts, and manipulated state politics to build up the Democratic Party in Mississippi asa support for Jackson's men and policies. The Regency replaced the Junto as the central power in Mississippi politics during the Jacksonian period. Old Pons fought it and emerged as a leading figure in the new Whig Party." In 1936, American historian Richard Stenberg described Samuel Gwin as having been one of Jackson's "parasites and favorites." Gwin ultimately died from wounds received in a duel resulting from the political conflict over a land-speculation scheme based out of the land office at Chocchuma, Mississippi.

== Early life and War of 1812 ==
Gwin was born November 24, 1793. He was a son of Mary McAdams, and her husband, Methodist minister James Gwin, who was close to Andrew Jackson, who became the U.S. president in 1828. Gwin was probably born at the Gwin farm in Sumner County, Tennessee. Samuel Gwin had served in John Coffee's mounted brigade during the War of 1812. The U.S. War Department records him as either a private in the 2nd Regiment of Mounted Gunmen (Williamson's), Tennessee Volunteers and/or a corporal in the 1st Mounted Regiment (Perkin's) of the West Tennessee Volunteers.

He later wrote to a U.S. Senator that he was "in Coffee's brigade in the assault and capture of Pensacola in 1814, and in all the engagements with the British below New Orleans." During the same period he served as "secretary to the General." He was said to be "a cripple" but could ride a horse. He was married to Nancy Cook on October 28, 1821.

== Federal service ==
His life for the 14 years between the end of the war and 1829 is undocumented. A surviving letter, dated May 16, 1829, from Andrew Jackson to one Hardy Murfree Cryer stated that the president was "saving an office" for Samuel Gwin, son of James Gwin, and got him a clerkship with a US$1,000 (equivalent to $30,234 in 2025) annual salary. In 1829, during the first year of the Andrew Jackson administration, records show that Gwin was appointed to a clerkship at the post office and went to Washington, D.C. for that job.

Andrew Jackson then wanted to appoint, first, his nephew Stockley D. Hays, to be surveyor general of Mississippi, and then to be register of the land office at Clinton, Mississippi, but Hays inconveniently died before he could fulfill his duties. As a second choice, Jackson wanted to appoint Samuel Gwin. U.S. Senator George Poindexter opposed both selections. Gwin wrote to Poindexter that while he remained devoted to his post office duties, he had health problems stemming from his military service and his wife was developing tuberculosis so a warmer climate would benefit their health. Gwin's appointment was rejected by the Senate, but Roger Taney suggested that Jackson that he could make a recess appointment, according to Taney's reading of the U.S. Constitution. Ultimately Gwin was appointed to a newly established land office at Chocchuma, Mississippi. A memorandum in support of Gwin was sent to Washington by "Powhattan Ellis, Gen. Thomas Hinds, and Robert J. Walker, signed by every Democratic member of the [Mississippi] legislature and by one thousand of the most influential citizens." Another testimonial was provided by George R. Yerger, J. S. Yerger, and Fulton Anderson, "who had known him from boyhood in Tennessee." Around the time of his appointment, Gwin apparently provided an affidavit that favored Jackson's recollection of the administrative circumstances under which Jackson launched his 1818 invasion of Florida. Gwin's wife Nancy died in October 1832.

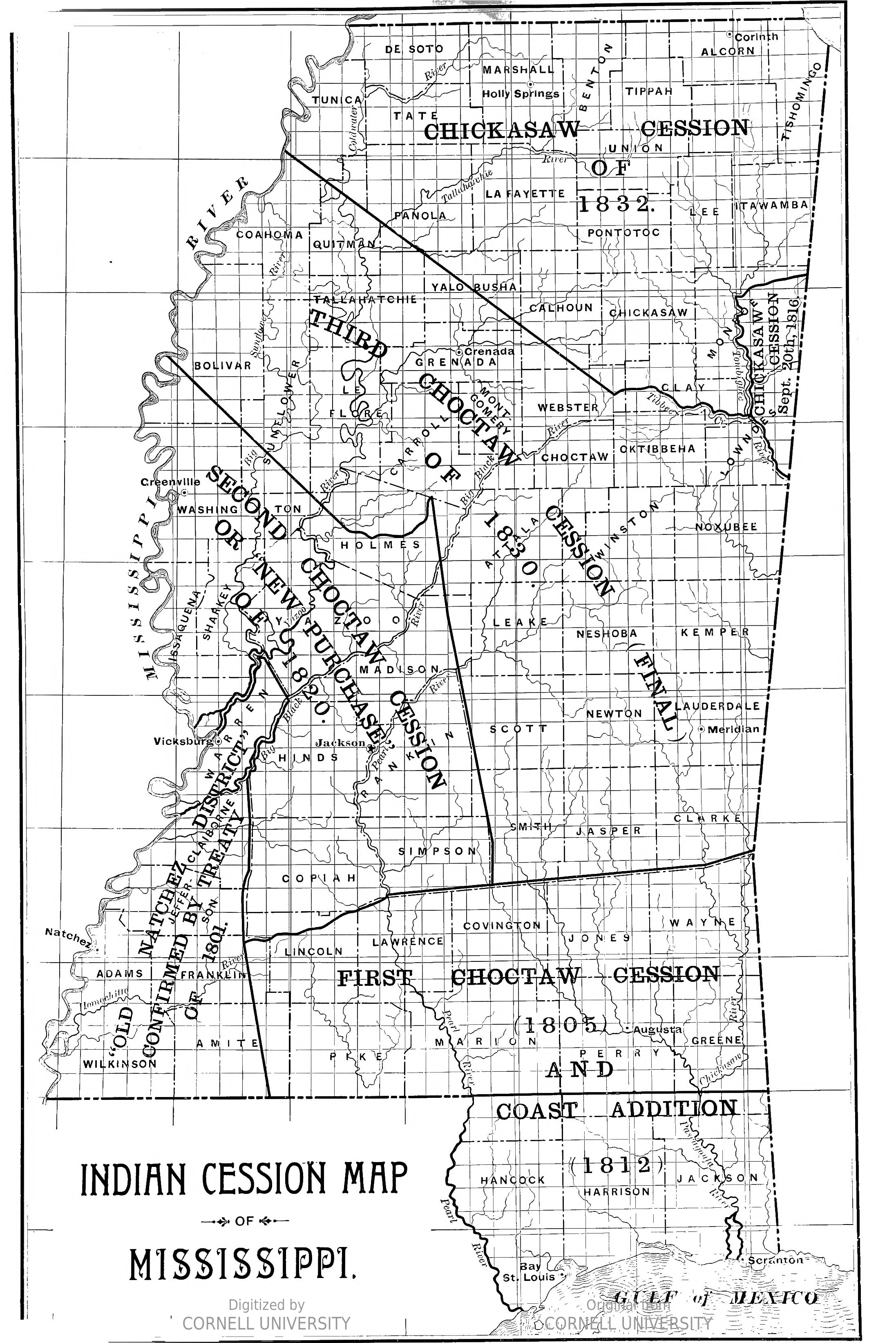
Indian cessions from Biographical and historical memoirs of Mississippi (1891)

Selling off the land in Mississippi that had recently been ceded by the Chickasaw and the Choctaw was a big business: "Federal government sales of Mississippi land climbed from 236,894 acres in 1832 to more than a million acres in 1833. Sales peaked at 3,267,299 acres in 1836."

== Mississippi Regency ==
Historian Edwin A. Miles described Gwin as the "guiding spirit" of the Mississippi Regency political clique and as the Mississippi prototype of "a new species of politician."

[Gwin] mastered the art of 'manufacturing public opinion' and strove indefatigably to mold the Democratic party into an effective political organization. He made arrangements to hold public meetings and conventions; he wrote letters and dispatched couriers to insure that they were well attended; he supervised the printing and distribution of presidential messages, handbills, and ballots; and he rallied the 'sovereigns' to exercise their franchise on election day. The party leader worked closely with such able propagandists as Anthony Campbell and Doctor Samuel A. Cartwright who contributed anonymous pieces to the Democratic presses. J. F. H. Claiborne regarded Campbell as 'perhaps the best writer in the Jackson ranks.'

After 1832, Samuel Gwin and William M. Gwin controlled patronage jobs in Mississippi, many of which were said to go to "carpetbaggers from Tennessee." Mississippi Jacksonian Congressman Franklin E. Plummer protested that "prominent friends of Jackson [claimed]...as the exclusive friends of the administration, the spoils of victory."

== Investigation ==
George Poindexter launched a Congressional investigation of Mississippi land sales. In the telling of historian Edwin A. Miles in his 1960 Jacksonian Democracy in Mississippi:

Whatever the basis for Poindexter's allegations, the investigation was conducted in a highly unjudicial manner. His enemies protested vehemently when he selected two well-known antagonists of Gwin to obtain depositions from witnesses in Mississippi. On the other hand, the senator charged that the postal authorities hampered the probe by delaying or mishandling his correspondence with the agents of the committee. Tempers flared between the partisans of Poindexter and the supporters of Gwin and on one occasion Samuel B. Marsh, one of the senator's closest associates, shot and fatally wounded Thomas Nixon, a friend of Gwin, on the streets of Chocchuma. In defense of his activities Gwin, who complained that the investigators sought testimony only from his enemies, forwarded several counter depositions to Missouri's Senator Thomas Hart Benton.

The sale of public land at the Chocchuma land office was ultimately investigated by the United States Congress, "which revealed that although members of Congress, the chief justice of the Court of Appeals of Mississippi, and the federal marshal were present, no one could recall that the provisions of the Act of 1830 had been read, as required by the instructions of the Commissioner of the Land Office, or that there had been protests against the clearly illegal actions of the combinations. It was also brought out that the register, Samuel Gwin, had left his office to buy some tracts and had resold them immediately at a 33 percent profit to settlers, but the only unusual feature of his conduct is that he was induced to admit his dereliction." Poindexter further contended that "Gwin was marking as already sold parcels of land that Walker and the Chocchuma Land Company wanted to buy, making that land unavailable to other bids and giving the Chocchuma Land Company a virtual monopoly on the choicest land." In the telling of University of Alabama professor Joshua D. Rothman in 2012:

...what transpired at Chocchuma prompted a fraud investigation by the Senate Committee for Public Lands, and even though that investigation concluded no laws had been broken, the activities of the Chocchuma Land Company clearly circumvented the spirit behind the auctions. For one thing, company investors effectively hijacked for their own gain sales whose benefits were supposed to accrue to the federal government, and by extension to the American people. Every transaction in which prices remained artificially low because the company short-circuited the bidding process represented the loss of money that should have entered the national coffers. Furthermore, it all happened with the knowledge if not the complicity of the land office register at Chocchuma, Samuel Gwin. Every evening at a tavern just yards from Gwin's office the Chocchuma Land Company held private sales of the land its agents had purchased during the day. Gwin could not have failed to grasp what was happening, and among the questions that dominated the Senate investigation was whether Gwin lined his own pockets by colluding with company agents...The company represented its actions as benefiting the majority of the settlers and facilitating the efficient and democratic sale of public lands. In reality, those who belonged to the company got almost exactly what they wanted while hundreds of settlers got an "arrangement" that was, in the words of one of their representatives, "the best that we could form".

Among the stockholders of the Chocchuma Land Company were Gwin's brother, William McKendree Gwin (at that time a U.S. marshal for the federal courts in the state and "former private secretary to Andrew Jackson"), Robert J. Walker, congressman Franklin Plummer, Mississippi governor Hiram Runnels, lawyer and planter John A. Quitman, and "Natchez-born planter James Girault, who was also receiver of the public monies at Chocchuma and thus perfectly placed to know the location of the best land being sold." Circa June 1834, Mississippians who were reportedly investigating Gwin included W. S. Jones, Isaac Caldwell, J. R. Marsh, and Gen. A. A. Allen. (Note: Allen, a state legislator representing Hinds County, was killed in a duel with Alexander Keith McClung in July 1834.)

Even though Jackson used their father, Rev. Gwin, as the channel by which the Old Roman announced Martin Van Buren as his preferred presidential successor, when time came for the 1836 presidential election, Samuel and William M. Gwin ("an old crony of Jackson's") were among those southern Democrats who struggled with the anointment of northerner Martin Van Buren as Jackson's successor and questioned Van Buren's fealty to the organizing principle of slavery.

== Duel, death, and legacy ==
Ultimately Samuel Gwin dueled George Poindexter's law partner Isaac Caldwell over sales of land ceded by the Chickasaw and Choctaw in northwestern Mississippi, and they both died from it, one sooner, and one later. The fatal duel took place in Clinton, Mississippi on January 12, 1836. Henry S. Foote was Gwin's second in the duel. There were reportedly 400 people assembled to witness the duel.

According to one account, "The parties fought, each armed with four pistols, taking their positions thirty paces apart, with the right of advancing. Mr. Gwin advanced, receiving the fire from four of his antagonist's pistols, one ball taking effect in his breast. The wound is considered by his physicians mortal. When Mr. Gwin discharged his pistol Mr. Caldwell fell, and soon expired." A local physician reported, "[Gwin's] wound is very dangerous, passing through the right lobe of the lungs. I shall not be surprised if he follows his antagonist to the grave in a few days". According to Foote, Gwin was "never after a sound and healthy man". In the telling of the 1938 American Guide to Mississippi, Caldwell dueled "to defend the honor of his friend, George Poindexter. Gwin had hissed a speech of Poindexter's at a free-drinking inaugural levee for Governor Lynch. Caldwell and Gwin were each armed with six pistols and were advancing upon each other as they fired. Caldwell died that day; Gwin lingered in agony a year." Gwin's one-year-old son died at Clinton, Mississippi in September 1836. His second wife Edith died at Clinton in November 1837.

Gwin died of a "congestive fever" of three days duration at the Exchange Hotel in New Orleans on July 24, 1838. At the time of his death he was said to be "cashier of the Union Bank" of Mississippi and a former receiver of public monies.

In 1961 a historian wrote of the Jacksonian era in Mississippi, "The test facing the ambitious Mississippi politician in the 1820s and 1830s was simple: How far can I pursue my independent course and still enjoy the protection of the great Jackson name? Senator George Poindexter is the prime example of a Mississippian who felt secure enough to swim against the currents of Jacksonian popularity; most—including Samuel Gwin and Robert J. Walker—drifted with the currents, even when the currents appeared to be flowing upstream."

== See also ==
- Rhea letter
- List of duels in the United States
- Carey A. Harris, Indian Affairs commissioner
- John Brahan, another Jackson-affiliated land officer
- Andrew Jackson and land speculation
- Title and rank in the antebellum U.S. South

== Sources ==
- Anderson, Douglas (1921). "The Fighting Gwins of Fountain Head". Nashville Banner. Vol. XLVI. Nashville, Tennessee. "The articles to be printed under this heading have to do with Rev. James Gwin and his two sons, Samuel and Willlam. They will take the reader into the Indian-fighting and camp-meeting periods of our history, and then into the Jacksonian and dueling periods."
  - Part 1 (August 7, 1921)
  - Part 2 (August 14, 1921)
  - Part 3 (August 21, 1921)
  - Part 4 (August 28, 1921)
  - Part 5 (September 4, 1921)
  - Part 6 (September 11, 1921)
- Cooper, William J. Jr. (2013) [1978]. The South and the Politics of Slavery, 1828–1856 (ebook ed.). Baton Rouge: Louisiana State University Press. ISBN 9780807142653. LCCN 78000751. OCLC 714609691. Project MUSE book 16682.
- Dittes, Al (April 2015). "James Gwin: The first Fountain Head Pioneer" (PDF). Days of Old Sumner County. No. 10. Gallatin, Tennessee: Sumner County Historical Society. pp. 6–7.
- Feldman, Diane T. (2025). Borrowed Land, Stolen Labor, and the Holy Spirit: The Struggle for Power and Equality in Holmes County, Mississippi. Jackson: University Press of Mississippi. doi:10.14325/mississippi/9781496857477.001.0001. ISBN 9781496857514. JSTOR jj.21655668. LCCN 2025007320. OCLC 1517343375. Project MUSE book 131209.
- Gates, Paul W. (November 1968). History of Public Land Law Development, Written for the U.S. States Public Land Law Review Commission. One chapter written by Robert W. Swenson. Washington, D.C.: U.S. Government Printing Office. LCCN 68062999. OCLC 453829.
- Miles, Edwin Arthur (1970) [1960]. Jacksonian Democracy in Mississippi. The American Scene: Comments and Commentators. New York City: Da Capo Press. LCCN 78107415. SBN 306-71884-7.
- Mitchell, Dennis J. (2014). A New History of Mississippi. Jackson: University Press of Mississippi. ISBN 9781626740198. LCCN 2013044104. OCLC 863127649. Project MUSE book 33980.
- Rothman, Joshua (2012). Flush Times and Fever Dreams: A Story of Capitalism and Slavery in the Age of Jackson. Race in the Atlantic World, 1700–1900. Athens: University of Georgia Press. doi:10.1353/book19535. ISBN 978-0-8203-4466-9. LCCN 2012030124.
- Stenberg, Richard R. (November 1936). "Jackson's "Rhea Letter" Hoax". The Journal of Southern History. 2 (4): 480–496. doi:10.2307/2192034. ISSN 0022-4642. JSTOR 2192034.
- Winston, James E. (April 1917). "Robert J. Walker, Annexationist". Texas Review. 2 (4): 293–312. ISSN 2380-5382. JSTOR 43465229.
- WPA Federal Writers' Project (1938). Mississippi: A Guide to the Magnolia State. American Guide Series. Mississippi Advertising Commission. New York: The Viking Press. LCCN 38012400. OCLC 813029. OL 6369720M. Project MUSE book 9965. This article incorporates text from this source, which is in the public domain.
