= Malcolm Gilchrist (Mississippi politician) =

Land owner and public official (1776–1851)

- Born: 1776; Robeson County, North Carolina
- Died: 1851 (aged 74–75); Jefferson County, Mississippi

Malcolm Gilchrist (1776–1851) was an American land owner, slave owner, and politician. Originally from North Carolina, he settled in Jefferson County, Mississippi in the early 19th century where relatives had established a colony and planted a Presbyterian church. Gilchrist represented Jefferson County in the Mississippi House of Representatives for three terms in the 1820s and 1830s. He ran a stage coach stop and post office on the road between New Orleans and Jackson, Mississippi.

== Biography ==
Gilchrist was born and raised in Robeson County, North Carolina to a Scottish immigrant named John Gilchrist, brother of Malcolm Gilchrist. In 1811 he moved to Jefferson County in Mississippi Territory where his sister Flora Gilchrist and her husband Dougald Torrey had been pioneers of the Scotch settlement. He migrated by land with his wife's family, the Galbraiths, via the Camden Road, "which was used by thousands of people moving to Alabama and Mississippi and other states in the South." Another account produced 25 years after his death had it that "He was in the war of 1812, and was at Gen. St. Clair's defeat. The writer heard him many years ago give a very thrilling account of it. He moved South after that event, and settled in the Scotch settlement, which embraced many families in this and the adjoining county of Franklin, east and southeast of Fayette."

According to family historians, "Malcolm Gilchrist and Anny Galbraith established a home in Jefferson County, Miss. He owned much land and had many slaves, but believed in having his children taught to do the practical things of life. His family still speaks of the lovely woolen spreads that his daughters made. Their home was a stage stop on the route from New Orleans north. The stage driver would blow his horn at the top of the hill according to the number of passengers he had. By the time the stage reached the house everything would be in readiness for the exact number as signaled by the toots of the horn." Another account, written by Thomas Reed for the Fayette Chronicle and excerpted in another newspaper in 1876, stated, "Malcolm Gilchrist was a prominent man in this county forty years ago. He often was sent to the Legislature, and was an associate justice in the county court; was postmaster in the office established in his house, where L. McLaurin, Esq, now lives. That was on the first stage route established from Natchez to Jackson, and was at time a point for exchange of teams." He represented Jefferson County in the Mississippi House of Representatives in 1825, 1826, and 1835. In political party affiliation, "He was known as a sterling democrat." Gilchrist was an incorporator of the Mississippi Railroad in 1836. The same year he was the postmaster of Malcolm, Mississippi in Jefferson County. Malcolm was six miles south of Fayette. In 1842 "proscription" under the spoils system removed him from the postmaster office (the Whigs were nominally in power, with John Tyler in the presidency). The Malcolm post office was restored to him two months later, to the approval of the Mississippi Free Trader newspaper. In 1843 the Free Trader announced that Gilchrist "the patriarch of Jefferson county, is a candidate for the Legislature in the Senatorial district of Jefferson and Franklin counties, and is opposed the Hon. Chancellor Turner. Gilchrist is a thorough democrat of the genuine Jefferson stamp—the latter a disciple of Alexander Hamilton." Turner defeated Gilchrist in the November election.

== Sources ==
- McLean, Angus Wilton; Purcell, John Edwin I; Singletary, Archibald Gilchrist; Purcell, John Edwin II (1942). Lumber River Scots and their Descendants; the McLeans, the Torreys, the Purcells, the McIntyres, the Gilchrists. Richmond: The William Byrd Press.
- Powell, Susie V., ed. (1938). Jefferson County (PDF). Source Material for Mississippi History, Volume XXXII, Part I. WPA Statewide Historical Research Project – via Mississippi Library Commission (mlc.lib.ms.us). This article incorporates text from this source, which is in the public domain.
