= James Gwin =

James Gwin may refer to:

- James Gwin (Methodist minister) (1769–1841), American Methodist minister
- James S. Gwin (b. 1954), U.S. District court judge
