= John Holman =

John Holman may refer to:

- John Holman (slave trader) (17??-1791), English slave trader
- John Holman (politician) (1872–1925), Australian politician
- John Holman (NASCAR owner) (1918–1975), former championship co-owner on the NASCAR circuit of Holman Moody team
- John R. Holman (1950–2017), philatelist
- John Holman (writer) (born 1951), American short story writer, novelist, and academic
- Sir John Holman, 1st Baronet (c. 1633–1700), MP for Banbury
- John Holman (chemist), British chemist
- John Holman (athlete), British high jumper and competitor in athletics at the 1990 Commonwealth Games – Men's high jump
