= Spoils system =

Elected party giving jobs to supporters

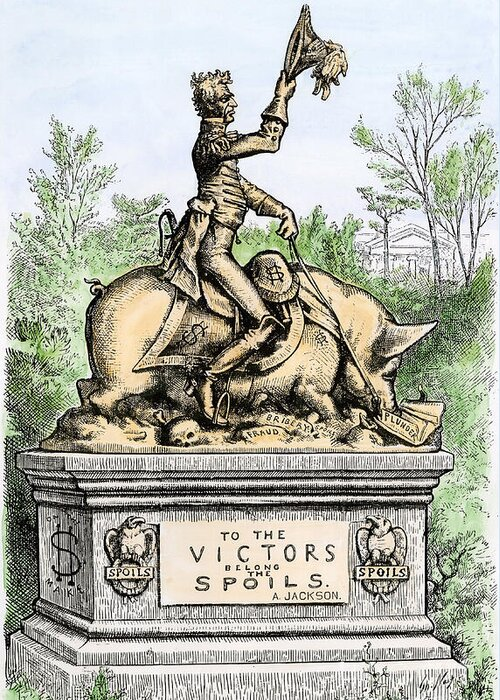
In memoriam--our civil service as it was, an 1877 political cartoon by Thomas Nast showing a statue of Andrew Jackson on a pig standing over "fraud", "bribery", and "spoils" and eating "plunder"

In politics and government, a spoils system (also known as a patronage system) is a practice in which a political party, after winning an election, gives government jobs to its supporters, friends (cronyism), and relatives (nepotism) as a reward for working toward victory, and as an incentive to keep working for the party. It contrasts with a merit system, where offices are awarded or promoted based on a measure of merit, independent of political activity. The term was used particularly in the politics of the United States, where the federal government operated on a spoils system until the Pendleton Act was passed in 1883, following a civil service reform movement. Thereafter, the spoils system was largely replaced by a nonpartisan merit-based system at the federal level of the United States.

The term was derived from the phrase "to the victor belong the spoils" by New York Senator William L. Marcy, referring to the victory of Andrew Jackson in the election of 1828, with the term "spoils" meaning goods or benefits taken from the loser in a competition, election, or military victory. Similar spoils systems are common in other nations that traditionally have been based on tribal organization, family or kinship groups, and localism in general.

== Origins ==
Although it is commonly thought that President Andrew Jackson introduced the spoils system, historical evidence does not support this view. Patronage came to the United States during its colonial period, whereas in its post-revolution form, the spoils system was introduced into U.S. politics during the administration of George Washington, whose outlook generally favored members of the Federalist Party. Washington has been argued to have introduced the system himself. Additionally, both presidents John Adams and Thomas Jefferson have been argued to have introduced the spoils system to U.S. politics.

== Andrew Jackson ==
Even before he entered the White House, some opponents of Jackson suggested that he had a habit of exploiting the public treasury. Samuel Clement, who had piloted steamboat troop transports for Jackson at the time of the Battle of New Orleans, pamphleteered in 1827:

"Some of those who zealously strive to increase the popularity, and promote the cause of general Jackson, figuratively say he will cleanse the Augean stable at Washington, meaning that he will expel the retainers at Washington and reduce the number of clerks in the secretaries offices. We have hitherto had but very little earnest of this disposition in the General; at New Orleans, the number of aides-de-camp which he had about him, I strongly suspect equated the number which Napoleon had, at the Battle of Austerlitz or any other of his great battles; and if the General for the purpose of curtailing the public expenditures, should be disposed to reorganize the public offices, will any one have the hardihood to say, that he knows enough of the labour, and of the proper manner of conducting business in those offices to know how many clerks they require, and consequently how many he might with propriety send adrift; beside there are some reasons to doubt, whether the General has so very great an interest in preventing expenditures of public money, or whether he holds public property so sacred as some would have it believed he does."

In 1828, moderation was expected to prevail in the transfer of political power from one U.S. president to another. This had less to do with the ethics of politicians than it did with the fact the presidency had not transferred from one party to another since the election of 1800—known historically for the extraordinary steps the outgoing Federalist Party took to try to maintain as much influence as possible by exploiting their control over federal appointments up until their final hours in office (see: Marbury v. Madison and Midnight Judges Act). By 1816, the Federalists were no longer nationally viable, and the U.S. became effectively a one-party polity under the Democratic-Republican Party. The Jacksonian split after the 1824 election restored the two-party system. Jackson's first inauguration, on March 4, 1829, marked the first time since 1801 when one party yielded the presidency to another. A group of office seekers attended the event, explaining it as democratic enthusiasm. Jackson supporters had been lavished with promises of positions in return for political support. These promises were honored by a large number of removals after Jackson assumed power. At the beginning of Jackson's administration, fully 919 officials were removed from government positions, amounting to nearly 10 percent of all government postings. According to historian Daniel Walker Howe, this was "more than all his predecessors had done in the previous 40 years. By the time Congress assembled in December 1829, Jackson had already removed 13 district attorneys, nine marshals, 23 registers and receivers, and 25 customs collectors, replacing them all with recess appointments. The removal policy hit the Post Office hard. Within the first year, the new administration dismissed 423 postmasters, many with long and creditable records of service." In 1913, a history of Tennessee commented, "It is said that in early life Jackson had made it a principle never to stand between a friend and a benefit. The converse seemed also to have been a principle: never to benefit an enemy. And those who were excluded from his friendship were excluded from preferment."

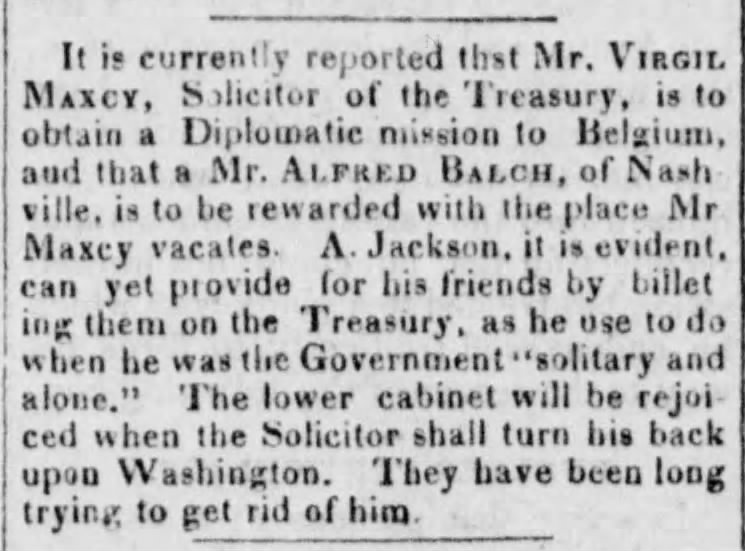
Reports of a plan to appoint Alfred Balch of Nashville to be Solicitor of the Treasury led a Martinsburg, Virginia newspaper to comment that former President "A. Jackson, it is evident, can yet provide for his friends by billeting them on the Treasury." (Martinsburg Gazette, June 21, 1837)

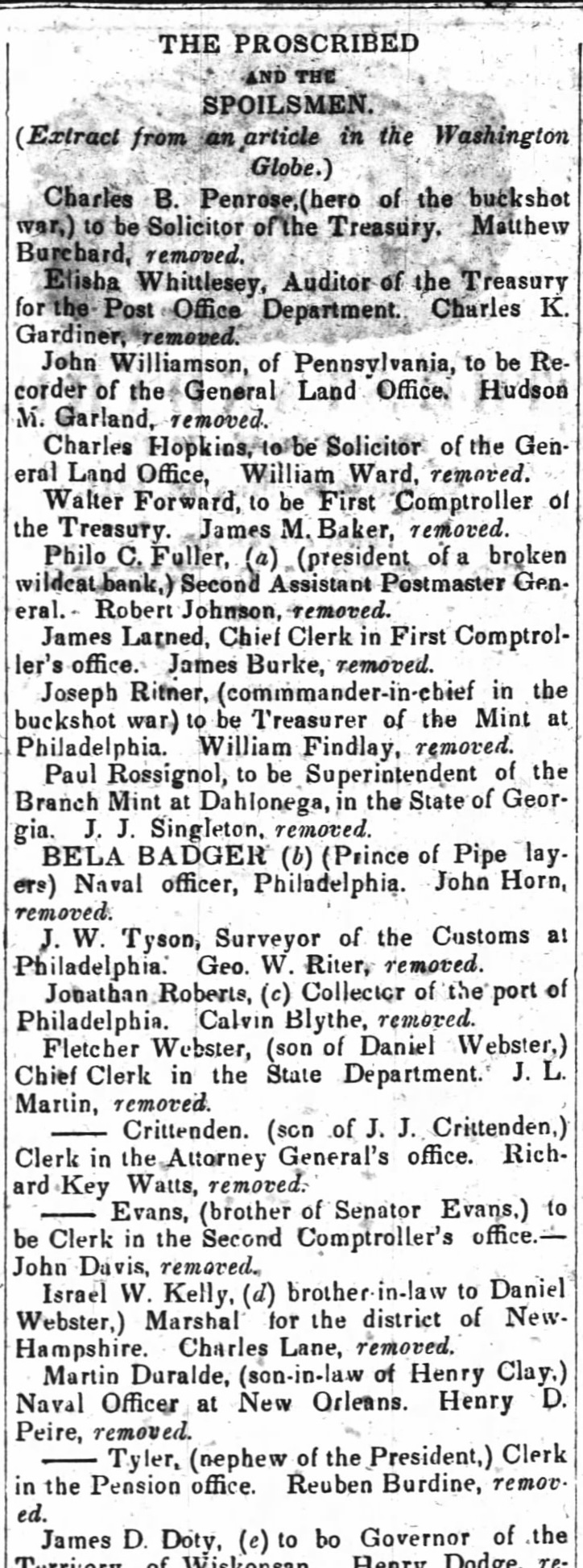
News article ("The Proscribed and the Spoilsmen", May 12, 1841) listed beneficiaries of nepotism and political patronage who were given jobs under the new Whig-party administration, including nephews and sons-in-law of high government officials, participants in the Buckshot War, and the "president of a broken wildcat bank".

Historians like Paul W. Gates and especially Malcolm J. Rohrbough seem to have concluded that the transfer of land from Indigenous to U.S. government title was particularly susceptible to exploitation, and that "the bias against adequate support for public work and the political utility of patronage appointments conspired to create a system that functioned admirably to transfer public resources to private hands but showed itself inadequate to any more grandiose end." As told by Rohrbough in his history of the government land office to 1837, "Andrew Jackson himself displayed signs of frailty in a period when men were becoming increasingly flexible in their ethical standards." Jackson used government appointments as currency with which to pay political debts, for instance by directing Levi Woodbury to appoint a judge "the office promised worth $1000." Newspaper editors who had supported the campaign, in-laws, and "attorneys" and "colonels" who were skilled at graft were often among the beneficiaries of land office appointments; per Rohrbough, "Historians have dealt harshly with the land officers of this period." The most-changed organization within the federal government proved to be the Post Office. The Post Office was the largest department in the federal government, and had even more personnel than the War Department. In one year, 423 postmasters were deprived of their positions, most with extensive records of good service. Jackson did not differ much from other presidents in the number of officials he replaced by his own partisans. There was, however, an increase in outright criminality, with a measurable, if not marked, increase in corruption in the Land Office, Post Office, and Indian Affairs departments, for instance, see the embezzlement of government funds from the port of New York in what is known as the Swartwout–Hoyt scandal. In another case, Jackson had personally battled to get Samuel Gwin, the son of an old friend, appointed to a land office job down in Mississippi; a Congressional investigation later found that Gwin "had left his office to buy some tracts and had resold them immediately at a 33 percent profit to settlers." Furthermore, Jackson's replacement of 29 of 56 U.S. Indian agents was critical to his administration's systematic expulsion of Indigenous people from the lands east of the Mississippi River because it removed any institutional resistance and left "several zealous officers at the top who had little sympathy for indigenous Americans" (for instance, Indian Affairs commissioner Carey A. Harris) and "dozens of inexperienced, patronage appointees at the bottom."

Jackson was also accused of dabbling in nepotism for the benefit of his family network of wards, in-laws, and nephews. As one history of public administration described, "During Jackson's administration, the policy of political patronage and nepotism in federal employment was intensified, partly because of his belief that rotation of government jobs was an essentially democratic process. What this implies is that political nepotism is not corruption, but one of the principles of sound democracy. This is, of course, ridiculous!" In 1831, "A Corn Planter of Madison County" called out the political appointments and government-funded salaries of Jackson's kinsmen Stockley D. Hays, John Coffee, John C. McLemore, A. J. Donelson, and R. I. Chester, asking, "Have we, sir, no high minded and honorable men amongst us, who are qualified to offices of honor, profit, and trust, but the nephews of President Jackson?" A favored grandnephew was named collector of customs for the district of Teche and inspector of the revenue for the port of Franklin, Louisiana in 1831. A grandniece's fiancé was made secretary of Arkansas Territory. Another niece's husband, George W. Martin, was appointed to the newly opened Cocchuma, Mississippi land office in 1833. Historian Ronald P. Formisano wrote in 1976 about the state of Jacksonian scholarship, "Kinship has acquired considerable visibility in recent years as a binding tie among political élites, and it is too important to leave to genealogists. This traditional element seems to have been a cement of many oligarchies which controlled local parties. Its influence on patronage suggests that studies of different modes of distribution—for example, party-oriented versus patron-client—are needed."

Jackson also seems to have rewarded supportive newspaper editors and owners with federal job appointments, granting posts including second controller and fourth auditor of the Treasury, surveyor of the Port of New York, receiver of public monies for the land office at Cincinnati, commissioner of the General Land Office in Ohio; marshal of Kentucky; customs-office collectorships at Natchez, Key West, and Boston; postmasterships in Lancaster, Detroit, and Pensacola; and various assignments with the United States Navy.

After Jackson and Martin Van Buren, succeeding Whig presidents swapped in Whig appointees of the same caliber, and the cycle continued apace.

== Reform ==
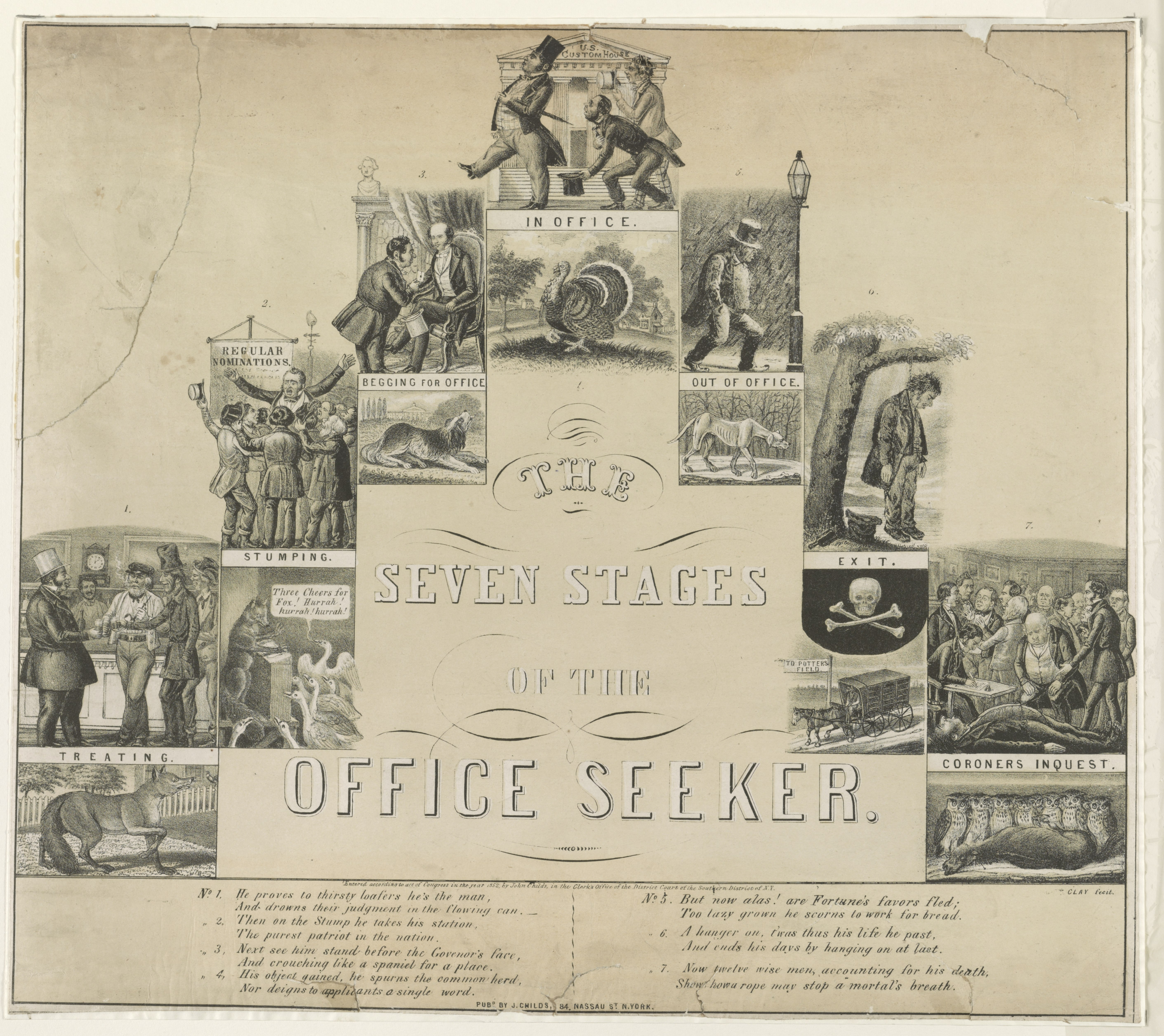
"The seven stages of the office seeker", 1852

By the late 1860s, citizens began demanding civil service reform, but it was only after the 1881 assassination of James A. Garfield by Charles J. Guiteau as revenge for the latter being denied a consulship that the calls for civil service reform intensified. Moderation of the spoils system at the federal level began with the passage of the Pendleton Act in 1883, which created a bipartisan Civil Service Commission to evaluate job candidates on a nonpartisan merit basis. While few jobs were covered under the law initially, the law allowed the President to transfer jobs and their current holders into the system, thus giving the holder a permanent job. The Pendleton Act's reach was expanded as the two main political parties alternated control of the White House every election between 1884 and 1896. Following each election, the outgoing President applied the Pendleton Act to some of the positions for which he had appointed political supporters. By 1900, most federal jobs were handled through civil service, and the spoils system was limited to fewer and fewer positions.

Although state patronage systems and numerous federal positions were unaffected by the law, Karabell argues that the Pendleton Act was instrumental in the creation of a professional civil service and the rise of the modern bureaucratic state. The law also caused major changes in campaign finance, as the parties were forced to look for new sources of campaign funds, such as wealthy donors.

The separation between political activity and the civil service was made stronger with the Hatch Act of 1939, which prohibited federal employees from engaging in many political activities.

The spoils system survived much longer in many states, counties, and municipalities, such as the Tammany Hall machine, which endured until the 1950s when New York City reformed its civil service. Illinois modernized its bureaucracy in 1917 under Frank Lowden, but Chicago held on to patronage in city government until the city agreed to end the practice in the Shakman Decrees of 1972 and 1983. Nonetheless, some federal positions such as U.S. ambassadorships have continued to be assigned to the president's political supporters up to the present day, leading to criticism that they perpetuate the old spoils system.

== See also ==
- Clientelism
- Cronyism
- Earmark (politics)
- Guanxi
- Looting
- Padrino system, Philippine equivalent
- Political corruption
- Political particularism
- Political patronage
- Pork barrel
- Separation of powers
- Soft despotism
- Whig Party (United States)

== Sources ==
- Bailey, Thomas Andrew (1981). Presidential Saints and Sinners. VNR AG. ISBN 978-0-02-901330-4.
- Chemerinsky, Erwin (2019). Constitutional Law: Principles and Policies (6th ed.). New York: Wolters Kluwer. ISBN 978-1-4548-9574-9.
- Friedrich, Carl Joachim (1937). "The Rise and Decline of the Spoils Tradition". The Annals of the American Academy of Political and Social Science. 189 (1): 10–16. doi:10.1177/000271623718900103. ISSN 0002-7162. S2CID 144735397.
- Gates, Paul W. (November 1968). History of Public Land Law Development, Written for the U.S. States Public Land Law Review Commission. One chapter written by Robert W. Swenson. Washington, D.C.: U.S. Government Printing Office. LCCN 68062999. OCLC 453829.
- Gilfoyle, Timothy (2006). A Pickpocket's Tale: The Underworld of Nineteenth-Century New York. W. W. Norton Company. ISBN 978-0393329896.
- Griffith, Ernest S. The Modern Development of the City in the United Kingdom and the United States (1927)
- Hoogenboom, Ari Arthur. Outlawing the Spoils: A history of the civil service reform movement, 1865–1883 (1961)
- Howe, Daniel Walker (2007). What Hath God Wrought: The Transformation of America, 1815–1848. The Oxford History of the United States. New York City: Oxford University Press. ISBN 978-0-1950-7894-7. LCCN 2007012370. OCLC 122701433.
- Karabell, Zachary (2004). Chester Alan Arthur. New York: Henry Holt & Co. ISBN 978-0-8050-6951-8.
- McCloskey, Robert G. (2010). The American Supreme Court. Revised by Sanford Levinson (5th ed.). Chicago: University of Chicago Press. ISBN 978-0-226-55686-4.
- Ostrogorski, M. Democracy and the Party System in the United States (1910)
- Parton, James (1881). The beginning of the "spoils" system in the national government, 1829–30. Civil Service Reform Association. New York: G.P. Putnam's Sons. LCCN unk81009481.
- Rohrbough, Malcolm J. (1971) [1968]. The Land Office Business: The Settlement and Administration of American Public Lands, 1789–1837. Galaxy Book 354 (Paperback ed.). London: Oxford University Press. ISBN 978-0-19-501472-3. LCCN 68029725. OCLC 176589.
- Rubio, Philip F. (2001). A History of Affirmative Action, 1619–2000. University Press of Mississippi
- United States Civil Service Commission Office of Public Affairs (1974). Biography of an Ideal: A History of the Federal Civil Service. The Commission.
- Van Riper, Paul. History of the United States Civil Service Greenwood Press (1976; reprint of 1958 edition)
- White, Richard (2017). The Republic for Which It Stands: The United States During Reconstruction and the Gilded Age: 1865–1896. Oxford University Press. ISBN 9780190619060.
