= John Holman (slave trader) =

18th-century English slave trader

John Holman was an English slave trader from London who settled in the Pongo River area in the 1760s before eventually moving on to South Carolina in 1790.

John Holeman Sr., upon his death, provided the economic base for the second largest slave holding family of African descent to plant rice in South Carolina.
