= William M. Gwin =

American medical doctor and politician (1805–1885)

William Gwin
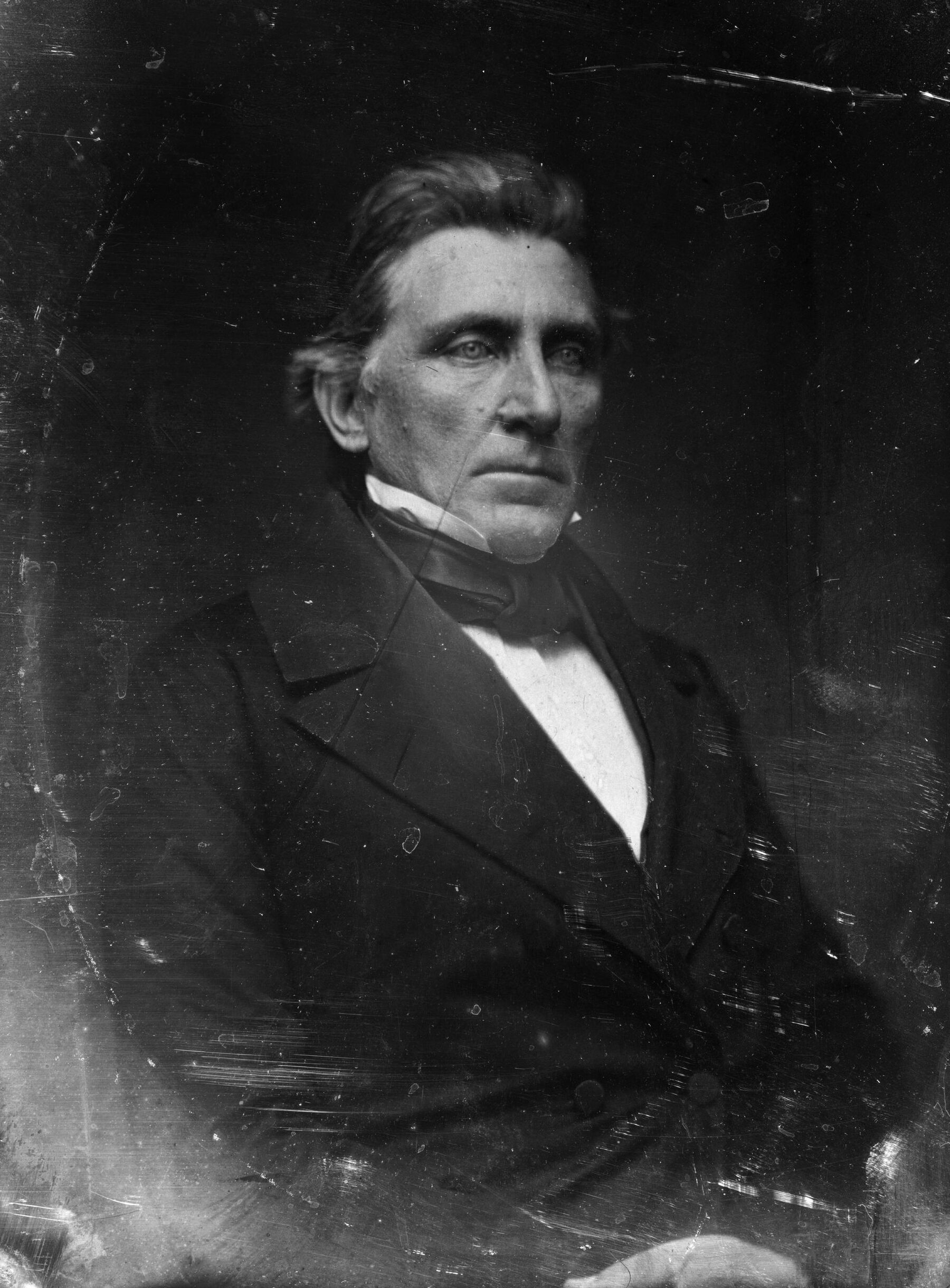

United States Senator from California
- In office January 13, 1857 – March 3, 1861
- Preceded by: Himself (1855)
- Succeeded by: James A. McDougall
- In office September 10, 1850 – March 3, 1855
- Preceded by: Himself (Shadow Senator)
- Succeeded by: Himself (1857)

United States Shadow Senator from California
- In office December 20, 1849 – September 10, 1850
- Preceded by: Seat established
- Succeeded by: Himself (U.S. Senator)

Member of the U.S. House of Representatives from Mississippi's at-large district
- In office March 4, 1841 – March 3, 1843
- Preceded by: Albert G. Brown
- Succeeded by: William H. Hammett

Personal details
- Born: William McKendree Gwin; October 9, 1805 near Gallatin, Tennessee, U.S.
- Died: September 3, 1885 (aged 79) New York City, U.S.
- Party: Democratic
- Education: Transylvania University (BA, MD)

William McKendree Gwin (October 9, 1805 – September 3, 1885) was an American medical doctor and politician who served in elected office in Mississippi and California. In California he shared the distinction, along with John C. Frémont, of being the state's first U.S. senators. Before, during, and after the Civil War, Gwin was well known in California, Washington, D.C., and the Southern United States as a determined Confederate sympathizer.

== Early life ==
Gwin was born near Gallatin, Tennessee. His father was Reverend James Gwin, a pioneer Methodist minister, who served under the prominent Reverend William McKendree, America's first native-born Methodist bishop and namesake of the younger Gwin. James Gwin served as a soldier on the frontier under General Andrew Jackson. William Gwin pursued classical studies and graduated from the medical department of Transylvania University in Lexington, Kentucky, in 1828.

== Political career ==
Portrait by Brady c. 1860–1861

As the son of a chaplain who was at the Battle of New Orleans, the young Gwin served as a personal secretary to President Andrew Jackson during the latter's second term. Gwin then practiced medicine in Clinton, Mississippi, until 1833, when he became the United States Marshal for Mississippi, serving for one year. Gwin owned extensive plantation lands and slaves in Mississippi.

He was elected as a Democrat from Mississippi to the 27th Congress of 1841 to 1843. Declining a renomination for Congress on account of financial embarrassment, he was appointed, on the accession of James K. Polk to the Presidency, to superintend the building of the new custom-house at New Orleans, Louisiana. He moved to California in 1849 and participated in the 1849 California Constitutional Convention. He also purchased property in Paloma, California, where a gold mine was established. The Gwin Mine would eventually yield millions of dollars, providing him with a fortune. He also organized the Chivalry wing of the Democratic Party.

Before the admission of California as a U.S. state, Gwin was elected as a Democrat to the United States Senate. He served from September 10, 1850, to March 3, 1855. He was a strong advocate of Pacific expansion and in 1852 advocated a survey of the Bering Strait. Gwin presented a bill that was approved by the Senate and the House and became the Act of March 3, 1851, which established a three-member Board of Land Commissioners to be appointed by the President for three-year terms (the period was twice extended by Congress, resulting in a five-year term). The function of the Public Land Commission was to determine the validity of Spanish and Mexican land grants in California.

California Governor John Bigler turned to Gwin's rival, David Broderick, when Gwin failed to help Bigler obtain the ambassadorship to Chile. Broderick was appointed Chairman of the California Democratic Party, which split as a result. Gwin had a duel with Representative Joseph McCorkle with rifles at thirty yards following an argument over his alleged mismanagement of federal patronage. Shots were fired by both men, but only a donkey died. The split added turmoil to California's political scene, including bribery, physical intimidation, and nonstop political maneuvering. Although weaker than Gwin's faction, the Broderick faction was able to block Gwin from being re-elected senator in 1855.

When the Know Nothings exploited the weakness, Broderick accepted Gwin's candidacy, and Gwin was re-elected to the United States Senate and served from January 13, 1857, to March 3, 1861. He took Joseph Heco with him to Washington, D.C., to meet President James Buchanan. In 1858, Gwin challenged Massachusetts Senator Henry Wilson to a duel, but they resolved their differences through a senatorial arbitration committee.

During the 32nd and 33rd Congresses he was chairman of the U.S. Senate Committee on Naval Affairs. During his second term he was also a member of the U.S. Senate Committee on Finance. While in the Senate, he secured the establishment of a mint in California, a survey of the Pacific coast, a navy yard, and station and carried through the senate a bill providing for a line of steamers between San Francisco, China, and Japan by way of the Sandwich Islands. By 1860, he was advocating the purchase of Alaska from the Russian Tsar.

Although the new Republican Party won several important urban contests in California, Gwin's wing of the Democratic Party did very well in the California elections of 1859. After the election of Abraham Lincoln in 1860, Gwin helped to organize abortive secret discussions between Lincoln's new Secretary of State, William H. Seward, and some southern leaders to find a compromise that would avoid dissolution of the Union. Before hostilities broke out between the states, Gwin toured the South but returned to California. Here Gwin's Chivalry faction spoke on the South's behalf. Gwin even considered that it might be possible for a Republic of the Pacific, centered on California, to secede from the Union, but when his party suffered badly in the elections of 1861, he saw that there was little more that he could do in California to promote that cause.

== Later life ==
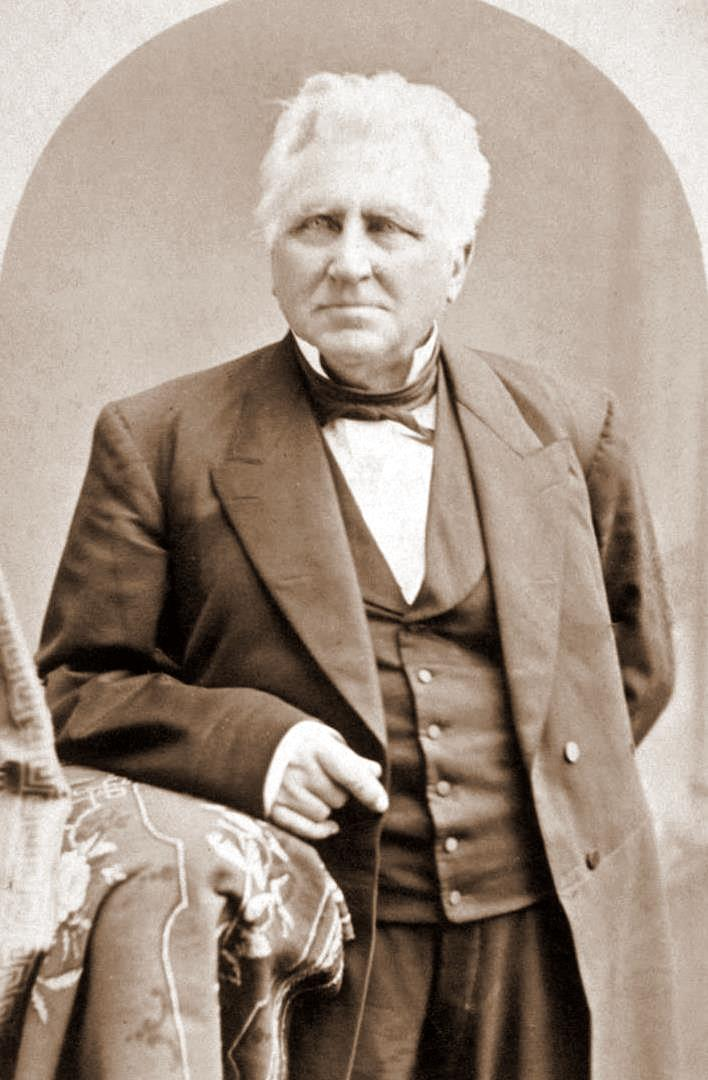
Gwin in later years

Gwin returned east to New York on the same ship as Edwin Vose Sumner, commander of the Union Army's Department of the Pacific. Sumner organized Gwin's arrest along with two other secessionists, John Slidell (soon after involved in the Trent Affair) and J. L. Brent. However, President Abraham Lincoln intervened for their release, wishing to avoid an international incident, as Gwin had friends in Panama. Gwin sent his wife and one of his daughters to Europe, while he returned to his plantation in Mississippi. The plantation was destroyed in the war and Gwin, a daughter, and son fled to Paris.

In 1864, he attempted to interest Napoleon III in a project to settle American slave owners in Sonora, Mexico. Despite a positive response from Napoleon, the idea was rejected by his protégé, Maximilian I, who feared that Gwin and his southerners would take Sonora for themselves. After the war, he returned to the United States and gave himself up to Major General Philip Sheridan in New Orleans. Sheridan granted his original request for release to rejoin his family, who had also returned, but was countermanded by President Andrew Johnson.

Gwin retired to California and engaged in agricultural pursuits until his death in New York City in 1885. He was interred at Mountain View Cemetery in Oakland, California in a large, pyramid-shaped mausoleum.

== See also ==
- Samuel Gwin (d. 1838), his brother

U.S. House of Representatives
Preceded by Albert G. Brown	Member of the U.S. House of Representatives from Mississippi's at-large congressional district 1841–1843; Served alongside: Jacob Thompson	Succeeded by William H. Hammett
U.S. Senate
New seat	U.S. Shadow Senator (Class 3) from California; 1849–1850; Served alongside: John C. Frémont	Succeeded by Himself as U.S. Senator
Preceded by Himself as Shadow Senator	U.S. Senator (Class 3) from California; 1850–1855; Served alongside: John C. Frémont, John B. Weller	Vacant Title next held by Himself; 1857
Preceded by David Yulee	Chair of the Senate Naval Affairs Committee; 1851–1855	Succeeded by Stephen Mallory
Vacant Title last held by Himself; 1855	U.S. Senator (Class 3) from California; 1857–1861; Served alongside: John B. Weller, David C. Broderick, Henry P. Haun, Milton Latham	Succeeded by James A. McDougall
Preceded by David Yulee	Chair of the Senate Post Office Committee; 1860–1861	Succeeded by Jacob Collamer
