= James Gwin (Methodist minister) =

American frontiersman (1769–1841)

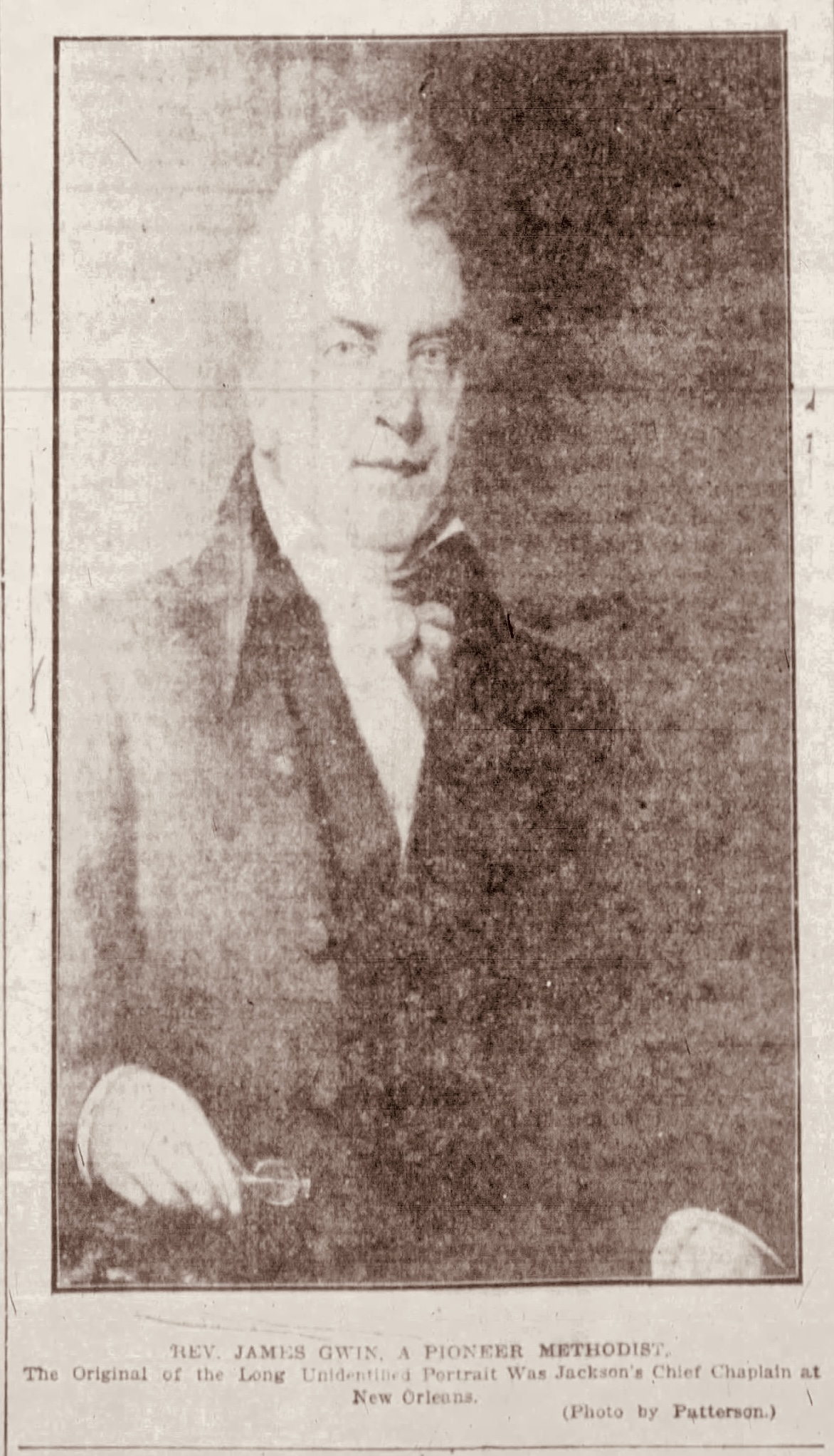
- Born: January 10, 1769; Virginia or North Carolina
- Died: August 3, 1841 (aged 72); Mississippi

Rev. James Gwin (January 10, 1769 – August 3, 1841) was an American frontier soldier and Methodist camp-meeting preacher who worked throughout the west, originally in Tennessee and Kentucky, then in Missouri and Illinois, finally retiring to Mississippi to be closer to his sons. In 1843 he was described as "the Indian fighter, and war chaplain to chieftain [Andrew] Jackson—one of the best Christians in the world, but believing it to be a religious duty never to forgive an enemy until he had first given him a sound thrashing—who believed both in prayer and battle—the battle first and the prayer afterwards." One of Gwin's sons, William McKendree Gwin, became one of the first U.S. Senators from California. Another son, Samuel Gwin, died from wounds received in a duel in Mississippi over an appointment made by Jackson to a U.S. government land office. The last letter Jackson ever wrote was addressed to W. K. Gwin; Jackson expressed his deep fondness for Gwin as well as his regard for Gwin's "venerated father and brother."

== Biography ==
Gwin was born in January 1769 in Virginia or North Carolina. He moved west around 1788, or maybe 1791, arriving in time to fight the Cherokee in Tennessee, participating in a bloody battle on Caney Fork and in the Nickajack Expedition. Gwin later wrote detailed accounts of these fights for the Nashville-based Western Methodist magazine in the mid-1830s, under the title "Recollections of the West." His first settled permanently at Hamilton Station, in Sumner County, Tennessee, and then later moved to Fountain Head. He was commissioned a coroner of Sumner County by Tennessee state governor John Sevier in 1798.

He joined the Methodist Conference in 1802, at Sumner county, Tennessee. He organized what was called the Barren Circuit in Kentucky. Beginning in 1807 he traveled in company with William McKendree and preached at camp meetings in Illinois and Missouri, which were then "but thinly settled." Methodist historian McFerrin described him as "commanding, being more than six feet in height, and in his later years he weighed over two hundred pounds...and his voice unsurpassed for strength and sweetness...His early educational opportunities were limited, but he was a great student of nature, and had wonderful fluency of speech. His sermons were not remarkable for order or symmetry, nor did they show much familiarity with the classics or scholastic divinity; but he was well-versed in the Scriptures, and had studied the human heart; hence his discourses were direct, and oftentimes eloquent and powerful...Said a young minister, who was his colleague in Nashville, while Mr. Gwin was pastor there, 'Brother Gwin, how is it that you are ever prepared to preach? You seem to be seldom in your study, and scarcely ever read.' 'O my son,' replied Mr. Gwin, 'you do not understand it: you preachers of your class have to read and study books to master your subjects, but I know what the books are made of before they are printed.'" He also worked part-time as a surveyor.

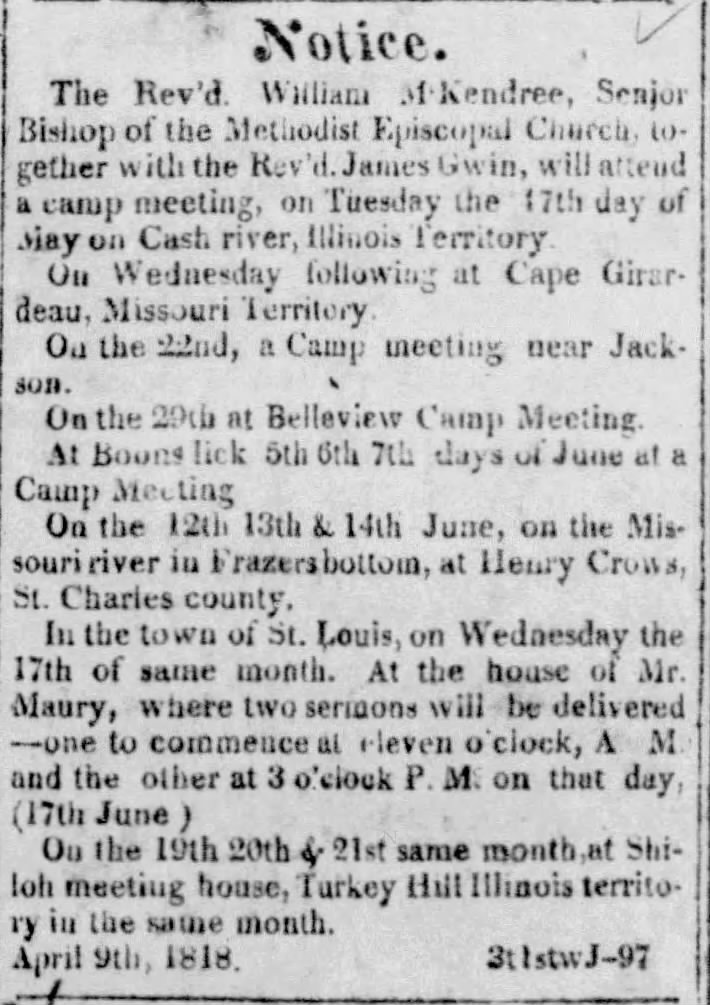
William McKendree and James Gwin camp meetings schedule 1818

McGwin was present at the Battle of New Orleans where he tended to the men as chaplain. It was later claimed by a Jackson-enthusiast Natchez newspaper that he commanded between 1,200 and 1,400 men at the battle, equivalent to a brigade. A rustic yarn told about the reverend is that "When a quartermaster sneered at the chaplain's black coat, Gwin took it off and thrashed the scoffer into a respectful mood. Then pulling on his coat, he knelt and prayed just as vigorously for the quartermaster's salvation."

In 1829 he had a ministry in Nashville to the enslaved. Around 1830, James Gwin, and his sons Samuel Gwin, William M. Gwin, and Alexander Gwin all purchased tracts of land in what was soon organized as Issaquena County, Mississippi. In 1838 James Gwin was appointed to the Methodist conference at Vicksburg, Mississippi, and Andrew Jackson visited with him there in 1840 on his Battle of New Orleans 25th-anniversary celebration trip.

According to the "California correspondent for the New Orleans True Delta" in 1850, "...the Rev. James Gwin, was for several years attached to Gen. Jackson's suite...Jackson was devotedly attached to him, and it is well known, that whenever he desired to reach the public ear, it was his wont to express his views or complain of his grievances in letters addressed to his favorite chaplain." One such case was an 1835 letter signaling that he favored Martin Van Buren over Hugh Lawson White to be his successor. Gwin died in 1841, at the Buena Vista plantation owned by his grandson-in-law Basil Kiger. Gwin has a grave marker at Cedar Hill Cemetery in Vicksburg, Mississippi.

== Family ==
His wife was Mary Adair McAdams.

One of his sons was William McKendree Gwin, eventually a U.S. Senator for California. Dr. W. M. Gwin also played an important role in Jackson's communications with Sam Houston regarding the establishment of Texas. His other children were Alexander Gwin, and Samuel Gwin, and a daughter who married Basil Kiger and lived on a plantation north of Vicksburg.

== Sources ==
- Anderson, Douglas (1921). "The Fighting Gwins of Fountain Head". Nashville Banner. Vol. XLVI. Nashville, Tennessee. - "The articles to be printed under this heading have to do with Rev. James Gwin and his two sons, Samuel and Willlam. They will take the reader into the Indian-fighting and camp-meeting periods of our history, and then into the Jacksonian and dueling periods."
  - 1921-08-07 Part 1
  - 1921-08-14 Part 2
  - 1921-08-21 Part 3
  - 1921-08-28 Part 4
  - 1921-09-04 Part 5
  - 1921-09-11 Part 6
- Dittes, Al (April 2015). "James Gwin: The first Fountain Head Pioneer" (PDF). Days of Old Sumner County. No. 10. Gallatin, Tennessee: Sumner County Historical Society. pp. 6–7.
- Gates, Paul W. (November 1968). History of Public Land Law Development, Written for the U.S. States Public Land Law Review Commission. One chapter written by Robert W. Swenson. Washington, D.C.: U.S. Government Printing Office. LCCN 68062999. OCLC 453829.
- McFerrin, John B. (1874). "XVII". History of Methodism in Tennessee. Vol. I. Nashville, Tennessee: Southern Methodist Printing House. pp. 419–469. LCCN unk82042716. OCLC 669362005 – via HathiTrust.
