= William McKendree =

American bishop (1757–1835)

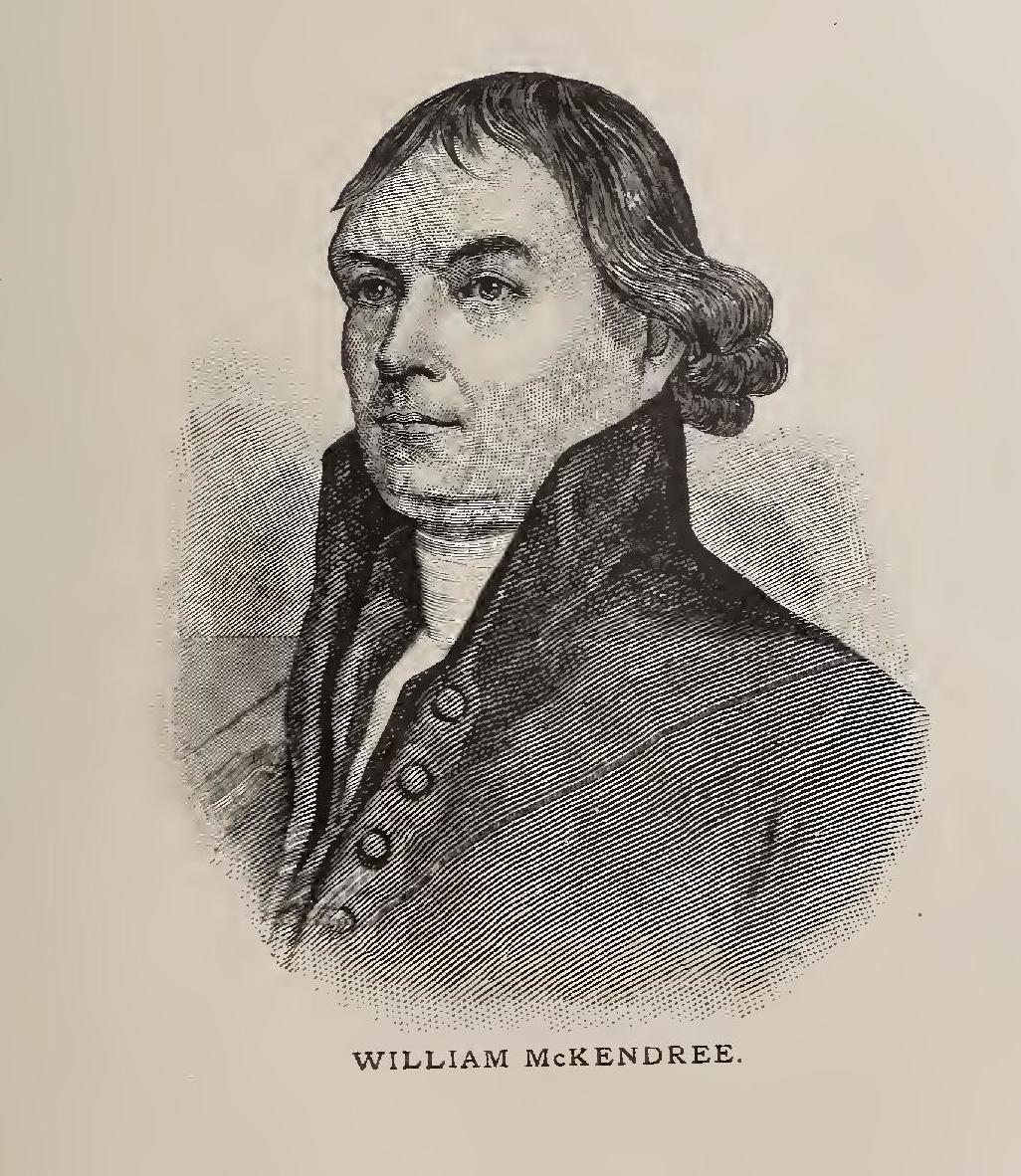
- Born: July 6, 1757; King William County
- Died: March 5, 1835; Sumner County
- Resting place: Vanderbilt Divinity School Cemetery

William McKendree (July 6, 1757 – March 5, 1835) was an Evangelist and the fourth Bishop of the Methodist Episcopal Church, and the first Methodist bishop born in the United States. He was elected in 1808.

== Early years ==
William was born in King William County, Virginia, the son of John and Mary McKendree. His parents were both of Scottish ancestry.

As a young man, McKendree served in the Virginia militia during the American Revolutionary War. He entered the ranks as a private, but eventually served as an adjutant in the commissary department. He was present at the siege of Yorktown and the surrender of Lord Cornwallis. After the war, he returned to private life.

William was converted to Christ in 1787. Shortly thereafter he began conversing with his friends on the subject of the Christian faith and making them the subjects of his fervent prayers. He soon volunteered to take part in public religious meetings, and his addresses produced a powerful effect.

== Ministry ==
In 1788, while living in Brunswick County, Virginia, William was received on trial into the ministry of the Methodist Episcopal Church. Unusually, he was admitted without first obtaining a License to Preach and without anyone's recommendation. Bishop Francis Asbury appointed him as junior preacher to Mecklenburg circuit and he served for several years on neighboring circuits.

The Rev. McKendree continued as an itinerant preacher until November 1792, when, having been influenced by James O'Kelly to join in certain measures of pretended reform, he was greatly disappointed by their failure at the General Conference. Mr. O'Kelly withdrew from the M.E. Church. Mr. McKendree, sympathizing with him, sent in his resignation as a minister. But the Conference agreed that he might still preach among the Methodist societies.

Rev. McKendree soon obtained leave to travel with Bishop Asbury, that he might ascertain for himself whether his impressions had been well founded. In a short time he was convinced he had been deceived. He therefore devoted himself to a careful examination of the Rules and Discipline of the Church as drawn up by John Wesley, and as established by the General Conference in the U.S.A. McKendree became fully convinced both of their harmony with the primitive church and of their particular adaptedness to the circumstances and wants of this nation.

In 1793 the Rev. McKendree was sent to South Carolina, but returned the next year. For the next three years, his circuit was vast—extending from Chesapeake Bay to the Blue Ridge and Alleghany Mountains. In 1796 he became Presiding Elder. In 1798, he was appointed to the Baltimore conference, and in 1800 he went with Bishop Asbury and Bishop Richard Whatcoat to the Western Conference, which met that year at Bethel, Kentucky.

Rev. McKendree was appointed the Presiding Elder of the Kentucky-Holston District, 1800–01. In 1801, the conference sent McKendree to oversee the church's efforts in Southeastern Ohio, Kentucky, Tennessee, and western Virginia and part of Illinois. He subsequently became Presiding Elder on the Cumberland District. He served as a circuit preacher in addition to his organizational efforts, becoming a respected figure in the region. He was the leader of the Great Revival in the West.

== As bishop ==
The Rev. William McKendree became widely know and most highly esteemed because of his popular talents in the pulpit and his faithful attention to every part of his work. Consequently, the 1808 General Conference of the M.E. Church, meeting in Baltimore, elected him to the office of Bishop. Indeed, when called to preach before the General Conference, such was the power and unction connected with his sermon, that Bishop Asbury was quoted as having said at its close, "That sermon will make McKendree bishop."

From that time, then, Bishop McKendree traveled with Bishop Asbury, or alone, over every part of the Church. His first episcopal tour of 1,500 miles extended through Virginia, Tennessee, Missouri, and Illinois. After 1816 he was Senior Bishop for nineteen years. In 1830, he lent his support to the Lebanon Seminary, Lebanon, Illinois. As a result, the school chose to change its name to McKendree College (later University).

Bishop McKendree never married. His family had moved to Sumner County, Tennessee about 1810. So when the bishop was not traveling, he also called that area home. He died 5 March 1835 at the home of his brother, Dr. James McKendree, in Sumner County near Nashville. One of his last expressions was said to have been, "All is well." McKendree was initially buried in a family burial ground in Sumner County, but in October 1876 his remains were reinterred to the grounds of the recently founded Vanderbilt University.

== Legacy ==
Bishop Matthew Simpson wrote of Bishop McKendree:

He was a man of great energy and genius, and was deeply pious and modest almost to timidity. His mind was clear and logical, his knowledge varied and extensive, his imagination lively but well regulated, and his eloquence was unusually powerful. He was careful in the administration of discipline, and introduced system into all the operations of the church.

Bishop McKendree's influence was patent everywhere, but especially was he regarded in the West. He had given years of earnest labor to establishing Methodism on the western frontier. He therefore felt a deep and abiding interest in the success thereof. He thus earned the nickname "Father of Western Methodism", and was considered one of the greatest Bishops of the M.E. Church.

People named for Bishop McKendree include William McKendree Springer, William McKendree Robbins, William McKendree Gwin and James McKendree Reiley's son William McKendree Reiley.

== See also ==
- List of bishops of the United Methodist Church
- Sketches of Holston Preachers
