= Chocchuma, Mississippi =

Extinct village in northwest Mississippi (state)

- Ghost town
- Location within the state of Mississippi
- Coordinates: 33°45′8″N 90°1′17″W
- Country: United States
- State: Mississippi
- County: Grenada
- Elevation: 190 ft (58 m)
- Time zone: UTC-6 (Central (CST))
  - Summer (DST): UTC-5 (CDT)
- GNIS feature ID: 705787

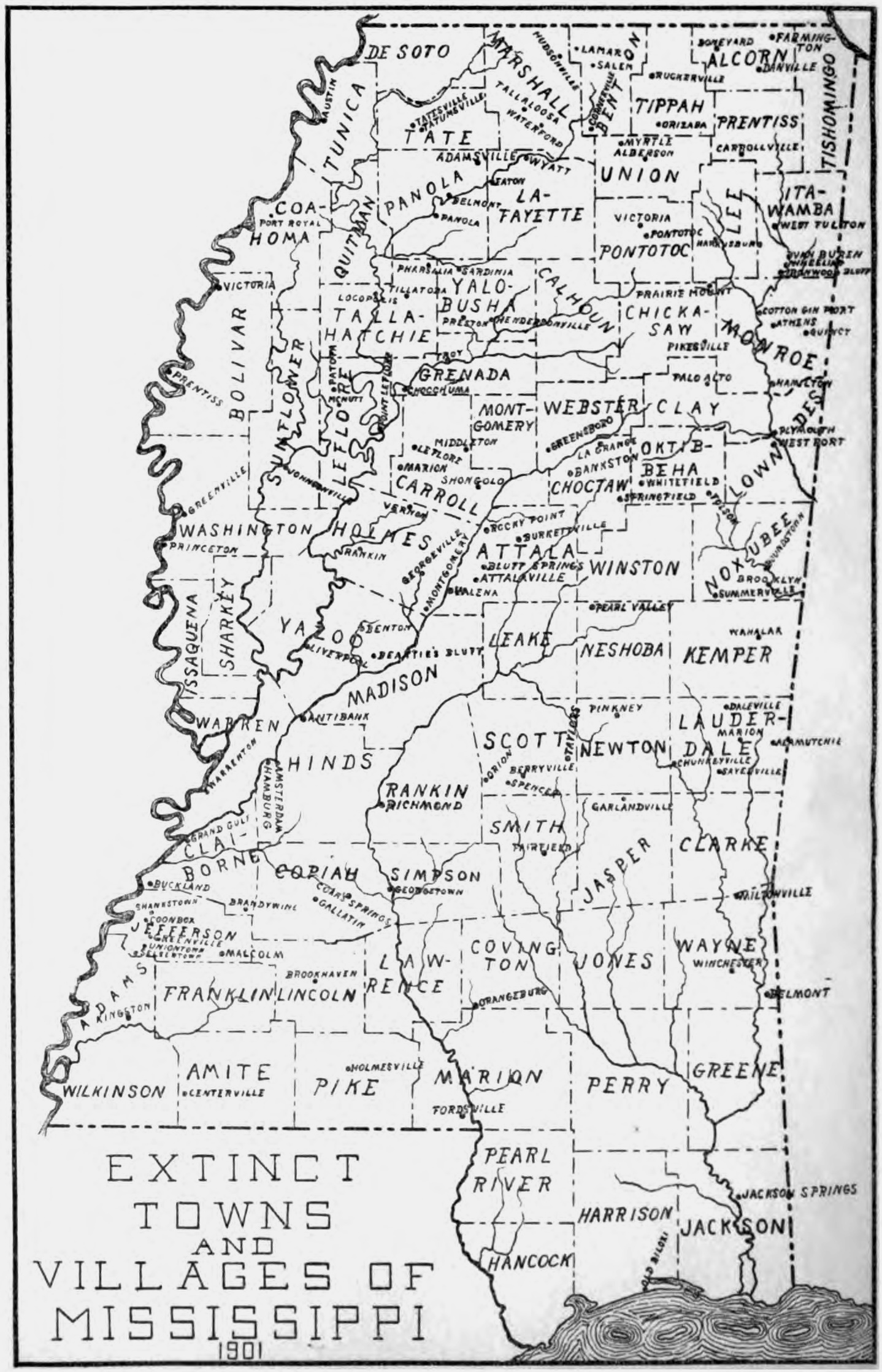
Extinct Towns and Villages of Mississippi

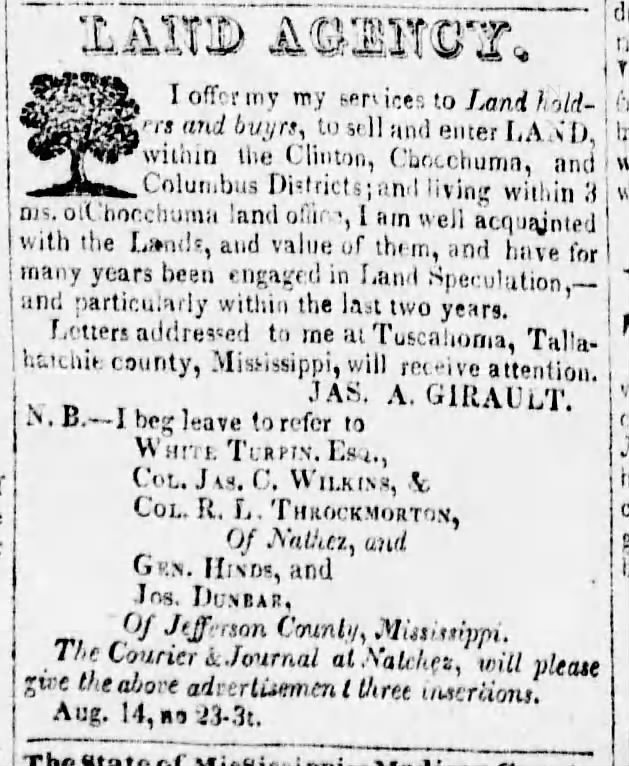
Land agent James A. Girault was an associate of White Turpin, James C. Wilkins, R. L. Throckmorton, Thomas Hinds, and Joseph Dunbar (The Weekly Mississippian, September 18, 1835)

Chocchuma, Mississippi is an extinct trading post and village in Grenada County, Mississippi, United States. It was located on the south bank of the Yalobusha River about three miles southwest of Holcomb, and 17 miles west of the county seat of Grenada. It was the site of a river crossing (33°45′18″N 90°1′22″W) by ferry, and a steamboat landing, and the road from Charleston to Carrollton passed through Chocchuma. The primary attraction of the town was that it was site of the U.S. Government Land Office for the northwestern district of Mississippi, established in 1833 to distribute the lands ceded by the Choctaw under the Treaty of Dancing Rabbit Creek. Another settlement, Tuscahoma (Tullahoma?), was established very near by at around the same time. As of 1835 and 1836 there were charges and countercharges of corrupt land speculation by the Chocchuma Land Company and/or government appointees working of the Chocchuma land office, possibly involving J. F. H. Claiborne and/or Robert J. Walker. A court case involving land claims out of the office was ongoing in the 1840s.

A Natchez correspondent wrote that between 1833 and 1836 Chocchuma had been a boom town, featured of "a population of several hundreds" and the host of "several large New York [business] houses." There was a 300 yd (900 ft) long Main Street "fringed on either side with a beautiful growth of sycamores." The "second principal street" was the site of the town's well. A town booster wrote to the Mississippi Free Trader of Natchez in 1836 that "navigation of the Yalabusha up to Chocchuma is not so good as could be desired, owing mainly to the leaning timber and shortness of the bends." The town had a two-story hotel. Other Chocchuma amenities included "five business houses, besides saloons, other shops, three hotels, five boarding houses." In June 1838 B. M. Doak was granted a license to operate a public house at Chocchuma.

When the land office was moved to Grenada in 1838, the settlement rapidly declined. By 1839, the settlements fortune's seemed to have cratered. A visitor later wrote that the population had dwindled from hundreds to about seven people and two horses occupying three cabins, with one old man telling that most of the population had departed in 1837, "left for Texas."

At the time of our visit in '39, we found it located on a bluff which jutted boldly into the Yalobusha, over which the cliffs hung, clothed with a thousand shrubs and vines, giving it an appearance of romantic beauty. The stream is about 20 yd (60 ft) wide, and winds along gently beneath, the perfect semblance of placidity. The town contains about 30 houses, all of which are miserably constructed log cabins, with the exception of a large frame building, which looked quite out of place amongst the more humbler tenements surrounding it. 'T was one of Uncle Sam's speculations, and cost him some US$35,000 (equivalent to $1,128,750 in 2025). Only four or five of the whole number of houses were occupied, and the few which were so, presented fewer signs of life than any grave-yard we have ever gazed on...perfect personification of the most complete and distressing desertedness. Three chimneys alone sent their curling currents to the skies, and not the crowing of a single cock, nor the lowing of a single cow, nor the barking of a single cur, heard we here.

The same author recorded a eerie description of a derelict "grocery":

...the ruins of the town "grocery," now mouldering in the dust, remained the miserable memento of many a one who found this, to them the gate to ruin. We stumbled over the old door, and on turning it over, found long and lengthened lines of "chalk scores," the running accounts doubtless of many, who then and there made their last run.

A man named George Connelly "engaged in the mercantile business at [Chocchuma] during its prosperous days." Nearby Grenada was established around 1838 by the union of Pittsburg and Tullahoma (Tuscahoma?). Cotton shippers and freight companies in the area settled on using Williams' Landing near the plantations of Greenwood LeFlore. James A. Girault and George R. Girault, originally from Natchez, settled in the vicinity and "were subsequently appointed respectively Receiver and Register of the Land Office at Grenada."

The site had may have had a prior association with the Chakchiuma people for which it was named. Chakchiuma territory was said to lie between the Choctaw and the Chickasaw "along the Nusa-Cheah and Oktibbe-ha Creeks and thence on west to about the mouth of the Yallobusha River."

In 1969 the former site of Chocchuma was said to be "situated where Parson's depot, on the Yazoo branch of the Illinois Central Railroad, is now located."

== Additional images ==
Chocchuma–Peete–Parsons
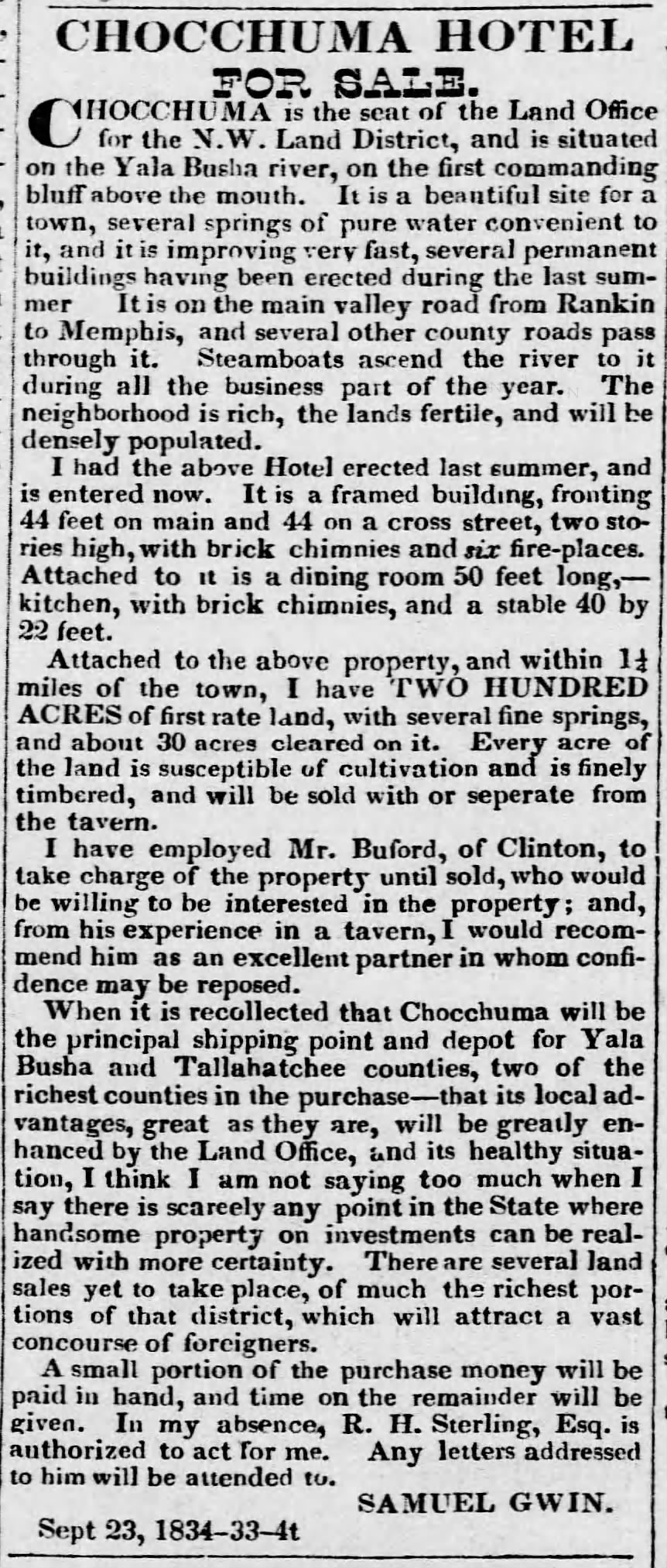
Samuel Gwin was the son of Andrew Jackson's friend Rev. James Gwin

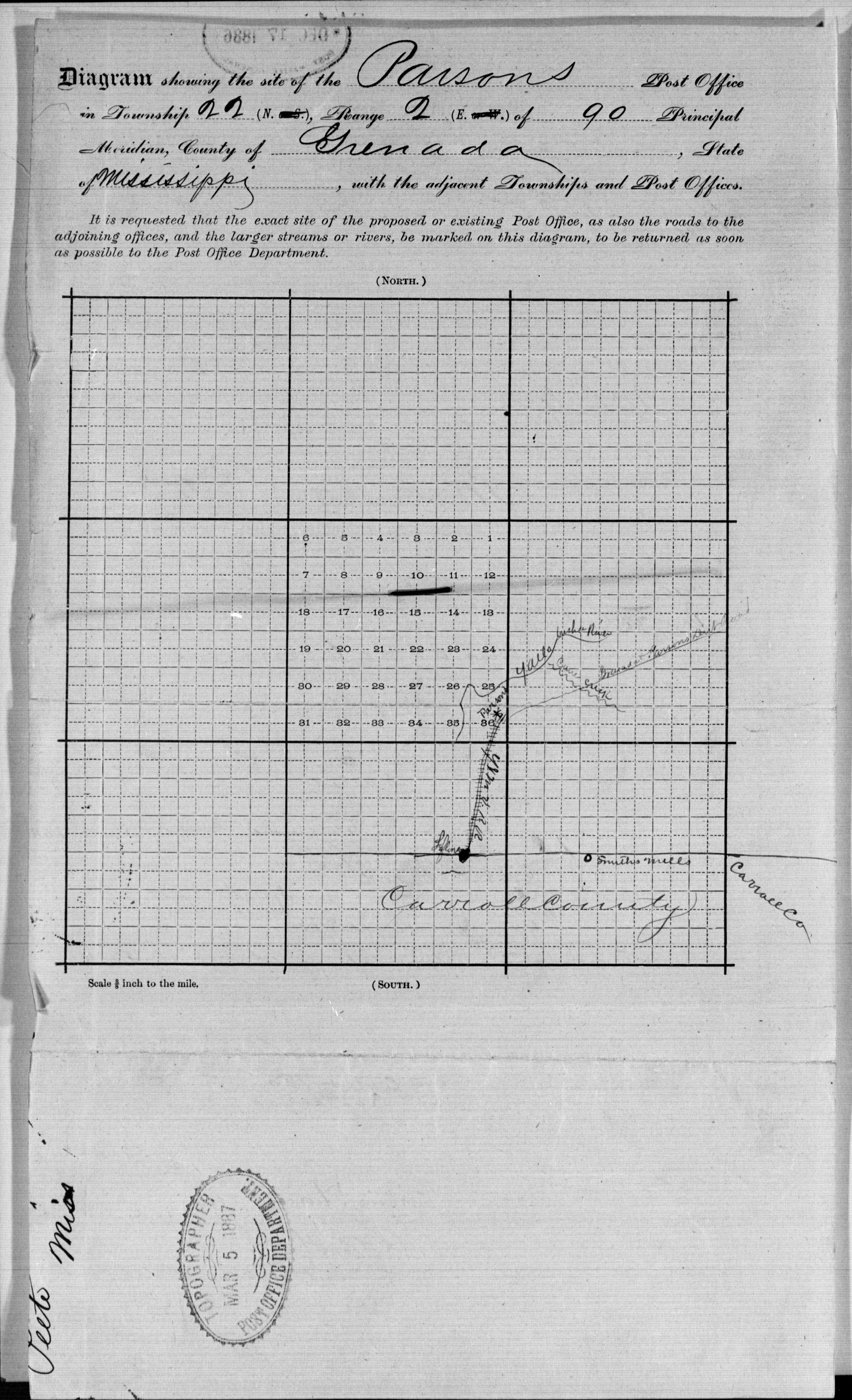
Location map submitted with Peete post office application showing depot location on the Yazoo and Mississippi Valley Railroad, 1886

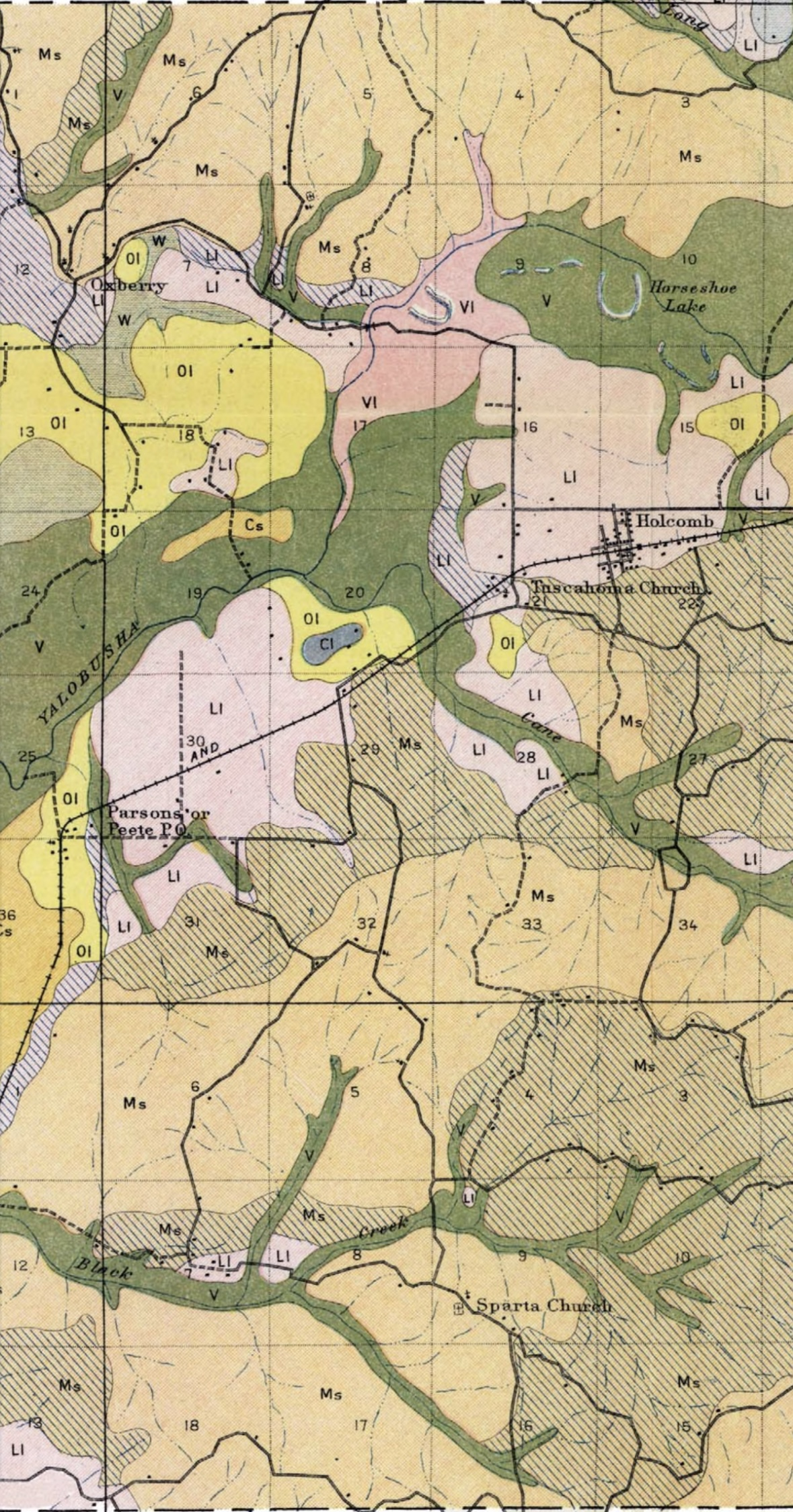
Detail of USDA soil survey of Grenada County, 1915

== Sources ==
- Riley, Franklin L. (1902). "Extinct Towns and Villages". Publications of the Mississippi Historical Society. V – via HathiTrust.
- Rohrbough, Malcolm J. (1971) [1968]. The Land Office Business: The Settlement and Administration of American Public Lands, 1789–1837 (Paperback ed.). London: Oxford University Press. ISBN 978-0-19-501472-3.
