= African-American slave owners =

Type of antebellum slave ownership

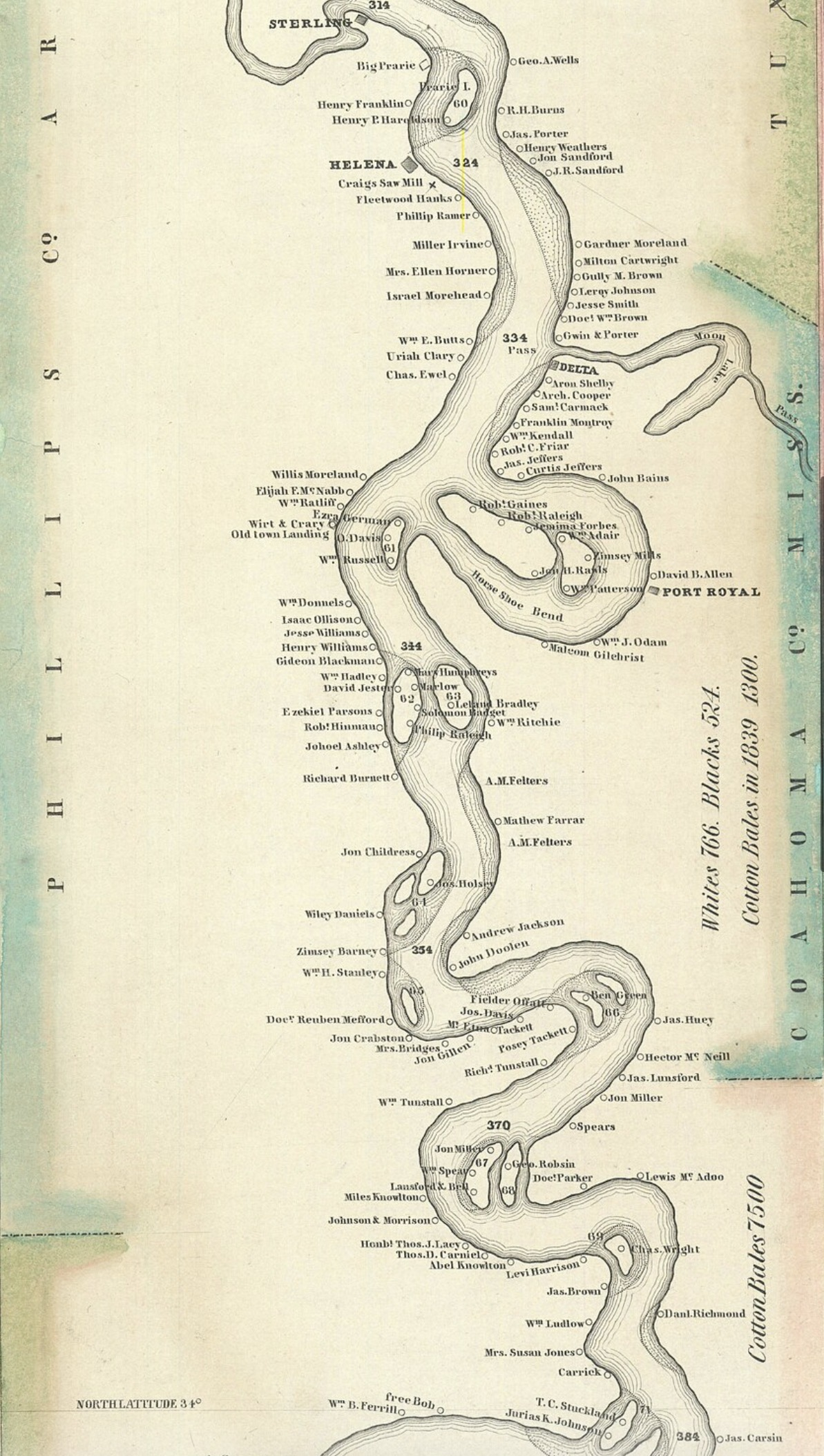
Free Bob was the only black slave owner in Arkansas Territory in 1830; circa 1840 Free Bob owned property along the Mississippi River in Desha County

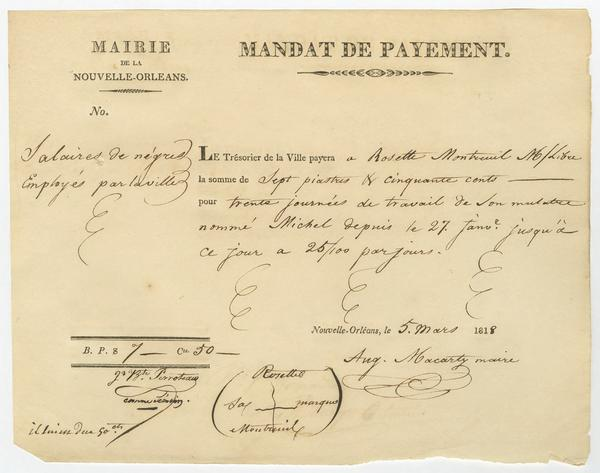
Order for payment dated 5 March 1818 from the Mayor of New Orleans to reimburse Ms. Rosette Montreuil, a free colored person, for the labor of her mulatto slave, Michel.

African American slave owners were African Americans who owned slaves during slavery in the United States.

Black slave owners were relatively uncommon as "of the two and a half million African Americans living in the United States in 1850, the vast majority was enslaved". There were an estimated "242 black planters, defined as property owners with more than twenty slaves, in the American South in 1850."

== History ==
Slave owners included a small number of people of at least partial African ancestry in each of the original Thirteen Colonies and later states and territories that allowed slavery; in some early cases, black Americans also had white indentured servants.

By 1830, there were 3,775 black (including mixed-race) slaveholders in the South who owned a total of 12,760 slaves; the Southern slave population at the time was around 2.3 million people. 80% of the black slaveholders were located in Louisiana, South Carolina, Virginia, and Maryland.

The historian James Oakes, in 1982, stated that:

[t]he evidence is overwhelming that the vast majority of black slaveholders were free men who purchased members of their families or who acted out of benevolence". After 1810, Southern states made it increasingly difficult for any slaveholders to free slaves. Often the purchasers of family members were left with no choice but to maintain, on paper, the owner–slave relationship. In the 1850s, "there were increasing efforts to restrict the right to hold bondsmen on the grounds that slaves should be kept 'as far as possible under the control of white men only.'"

It has been widely claimed that an African former indentured servant who settled in Virginia in 1621, Anthony Johnson, became one of the earliest documented slave owners in the mainland American colonies when he won a civil suit for ownership of John Casor. However, the first "documented slave for life", John Punch, lived in Virginia but was held by Hugh Gwyn, a white man, not Anthony Johnson.

There were economic and ethnic differences between free blacks of the Upper South and the Deep South, with the latter fewer in number, but wealthier and typically of mixed race. Half of the black slaveholders lived in cities rather than the countryside, with most living in New Orleans and Charleston. In particular, New Orleans had a large, relatively wealthy free black population (gens de couleur) composed of people of mixed race, who had become a third social class between whites and enslaved blacks, under French and Spanish colonial rule. Relatively few non-white slaveholders were substantial planters; of those who were, most were of mixed race, often endowed by white fathers with some property and social capital. For example, Andrew Durnford of New Orleans was listed as owning 77 slaves.

According to Rachel Kranz:

Durnford was known as a stern master who worked his slaves hard and punished them often in his efforts to make his Louisiana sugar plantation a success.

In the years leading up to the Civil War, Antoine Dubuclet, who owned over a hundred slaves, was considered the wealthiest black slaveholder in Louisiana.

The historians John Hope Franklin and Loren Schweninger wrote:

A large majority of profit-oriented free black slaveholders resided in the Lower South. For the most part, they were persons of mixed racial origin, often women who cohabited or were mistresses of white men, or mulatto men ... Provided land and slaves by whites, they owned farms and plantations, worked their hands in the rice, cotton, and sugar fields, and like their white contemporaries were troubled with runaways.

The historian Ira Berlin wrote:

In slave societies, nearly everyone – free and slave – aspired to enter the slaveholding class, and upon occasion some former slaves rose into slaveholders' ranks. Their acceptance was grudging, as they carried the stigma of bondage in their lineage and, in the case of American slavery, color in their skin.

African American history and culture scholar Henry Louis Gates Jr. wrote:

the percentage of free black slave owners as the total number of free black heads of families was quite high in several states, namely 43 percent in South Carolina, 40 percent in Louisiana, 26 percent in Mississippi, 25 percent in Alabama and 20 percent in Georgia.

Free blacks were perceived "as a continual symbolic threat to slaveholders, challenging the idea that 'black' and 'slave' were synonymous". Free blacks were sometimes seen as potential allies of fugitive slaves and "slaveholders bore witness to their fear and loathing of free blacks in no uncertain terms". For free blacks, who had only a precarious hold on freedom, "slave ownership was not simply an economic convenience but indispensable evidence of the free blacks' determination to break with their slave past and their silent acceptance – if not approval – of slavery."

In his 1985 statewide study of black slaveholders in South Carolina, Larry Koger challenged this benevolent view. He found that the majority of mixed-race or black slaveholders appeared to hold at least some of their slaves for commercial reasons. For instance, he noted that in 1850, more than 80% of black slaveholders were of mixed race, but nearly 90% of their slaves were classified as black. Koger also noted that many South Carolina free blacks operated small businesses as skilled artisans, and many owned slaves working in those businesses. "Koger emphasizes that it was all too common for freed slaves to become slaveholders themselves."

Some free black slaveholders in New Orleans offered to fight for Confederate Louisiana in the Civil War, but confederate laws prevented them from ever becoming soldiers. Over 1,000 free mixed people (creoles of color) volunteered and formed the 1st Louisiana Native Guard, which was disbanded without ever seeing combat.

The phenomenon of black slave owners remains a controversial topic among proponents of Afrocentrism.
