= Malcolm Gilchrist (North Carolina politician) =

Land owner and public official (1744–1821)

- Born: February 8, 1744; Kintyre, Scotland
- Died: April 12, 1821 (aged 77); Maury County, Tennessee, United States

Malcolm Gilchrist (February 8, 1744 – April 12, 1821) was an American land owner and politician. He served multiple terms in both houses in the North Carolina General Assembly in the 1790s.

== Biography ==
Gilchrist immigrated with his brother and sister to the United States from Scotland in 1770. He settled at Little Crain's Creek in Moore County, North Carolina by 1775. Gilchrist served as a justice of the peace of Moore County beginning in 1787. He served as sheriff of Moore County from 1792 to 1794. He represented Moore County in the North Carolina House in 1794 and 1795, and in the North Carolina Senate in 1796, 1798, 1799, and 1800. The other representative from Moore County for much of this period was Thomas Overton, the 13-years-older brother of John Overton, longtime business partner and friend of Andrew Jackson.

In 1809 he relocated to Maury County, Tennessee with his wife and nine children. He had earlier purchased a 1,000-acre tract in that county. When Gilchrist died in 1821 he left "land, land warrants, slaves, books, and other property to his children and grandchildren." He and his wife Catherine Buie Gilchrist are both buried in Mount Pleasant Cemetery in Maury County.

== See also ==
- Malcolm Gilchrist (speculator)

== Sources ==
- McLean, Angus Wilton; Purcell, John Edwin I; Singletary, Archibald Gilchrist; Purcell, John Edwin II (1942). Lumber River Scots and their Descendants; the McLeans, the Torreys, the Purcells, the McIntyres, the Gilchrists. Richmond: The William Byrd Press. LCCN 42014522. OCLC 1669112.
- Robinson, Blackwell P. (1956). A History of Moore County, North Carolina, 1747–1847. Southern Pines, North Carolina: Moore County Historical Association.
