= Paul Wallace Gates =

American historian

- Born: December 14, 1901; Nashua, New Hampshire
- Died: January 5, 1999 (aged 97); Oakland, California
- Occupation: Historian
- Known for: Foremost authority on history of United States land law

Paul Wallace Gates (December 14, 1901 – January 5, 1999) was a professor of history and general historian who is widely considered to be the foremost authority on the history of federal land policy in the United States. Gates wrote 10 books and 75 academic articles, and his magnum opus was History of Public Land Law Development.

== Life and career ==
Gates was born in Nashua, New Hampshire, son of a Protestant minister. His undergraduate work was chiefly at Colby College (B.S., 1924), although he also attended Clark University (A.M., 1925) and the University of Wisconsin. He earned his PhD from Harvard University in 1930, working under the direction of Frederick Merk. Gates' PhD thesis was the basis of his first book, The Illinois Central Railroad and Its Colonization Work (1934), for which he was awarded the David A. Wells Prize at Harvard. Gates was an instructor at Harvard (1929–1930) while working on his doctorate, and after receiving his PhD he worked for the Agricultural Adjustment Administration, and taught at Bucknell University (1930–1936).

In 1935 Gates began his career at Cornell University, where he did the majority of his academic work. From 1946 to 1956 he was the Chair of the Department of History. He eventually earned the honor of being named the John Stambaugh Professor of History. Aside from his research, he was a renowned professor of undergraduate courses and had 23 PhD students, many of whom became leaders in the profession as well. He emphasized with these students interdisciplinary studies, a characteristic of Gates himself. After he retired in 1971, he continued writing many seminal works on the subject of land law and well into his 90s was still being honored as the foremost leader in this field.

Gates wrote on many separate regions, with a focus on the upper Midwest and California. Although his early career interests were in federal land policy in general, as he himself once said, "It soon became apparent that before a history of the Public Domain could be written, special and regional studies would have to be prepared to show the functioning of the land system in a number of fairly typical states and smaller subdivisions."

Gates was married for over 60 years to Lillian Cowdell Gates, who had an independent academic career and also collaborated with Paul on several books. They had 4 children and 17 grandchildren. After Lillian died, Paul remarried. He died in Oakland, California, where he had lived briefly late in his retirement. Among the honorary degrees that he received were the hon. L.H.D. from Colby College (1967), and the hon. LL.D. from the University of Maine (1968).

== Bibliography ==
In addition to the references above, the following selected list of works is provided since his writings define who Gates was. Most of these works are by Gates but some of them are about Gates.

=== Books and other monographs ===
- Ellis, David M, ed. (1969). The Frontier in American Development: Essays in Honor of Paul Wallace Gates. Ithaca: Cornell University Press. OCLC 6025.
- Gates, Paul Wallace (1997). Fifty Million Acres: Conflicts Over Kansas Land Policy, 1854-1890. Norman, OK: University of Oklahoma Press. ISBN 978-0806129914. OCLC 36767605.
- Gates, Paul Wallace (2011). The Wisconsin Pine Lands of Cornell University. Ithaca and London: Fall Creek Books. ISBN 978-0-8014-7763-8. Reprint edition available for sale October 31, 2013.

=== Journal articles ===
- Gates, Paul W. (March 1948). "Hoosier Cattle Kings". Indiana Magazine of History. 44 (1): 1–24.
- Gates, Paul W. (May 1956). "Private Land Claims in the South". Journal of Southern History. 22 (2). Southern Historical Association: 183–204. doi:10.2307/2954238. JSTOR 2954238.
- Gates, Paul W. (May 1958). "Adjudication of Spanish-Mexican Land Claims in California". Huntington Library Quarterly. 21 (3). University of California Press: 213–236. doi:10.2307/3816434. JSTOR 3816434.
- Gates, Paul W. (May 1961). "California's Agricultural College Lands". Pacific Historical Review. 30 (2). University of California Press: 103–122. doi:10.2307/3636696. JSTOR 3636696.
- Gates, Paul W. (June 1961). "California's Embattled Settlers". California Historical Society Quarterly. 41 (2). University of California Press: 99–130. doi:10.2307/25155471. JSTOR 25155471.
- Gates, Paul W. (June 1967). "Pre-Henry George Land Welfare in California". California Historical Society Quarterly. 46 (2). University of California Press: 121–148. doi:10.2307/25154205. JSTOR 25154205.
- Gates, Paul W. (Summer 1969). "Frontier Land Business in Wisconsin". The Wisconsin Magazine of History. 52 (4). State Historical Society of Wisconsin: 306–327.
- Gates, Paul W. (November 1970). "The Suscol Principle, Preemption and California Latifundia". Pacific Historical Review. 39 (4). University of California Press: 453–471. doi:10.2307/3637782. JSTOR 3637782.
- Gates, Paul W. (December 1971). "The California Land Act of 1851". California Historical Quarterly. 50 (4). University of California Press: 395–430. doi:10.2307/25157352. JSTOR 25157352.
- Bogue, Allan G. (2006). "Tilling Agricultural History with Paul Wallace Gates and James C. Malin". Agricultural History. 80 (4). Agricultural History Society: 436–460. doi:10.1525/ah.2006.80.4.436. JSTOR 4617776. S2CID 144038445.

== Sources ==
- Gates, Paul W. (1968). History of Public Land Law Development. Washington: Public Land Law Review Commission. OCLC 238828444.
- Bogue, Allan G.; Bogue, Margaret Beattie; LaFeber, Walter; Silbey, Joel (May 1999). "In Memoriam: Paul W. Gates". Perspectives. American Historical Association. Archived from the original on July 4, 2004.
- Gates, Paul W. (1934). The Illinois Central Railroad and Its Colonization Work. Cambridge: Harvard University Press. OCLC 1929843.
- Petulla, Joseph M. (Summer 1977). "Paul Wallace Gates, Historian of Public Land Policy". California Historical Quarterly. 56 (2). San Francisco: University of California Press: 170–174. doi:10.2307/25157703. JSTOR 25157703.
- Gates, Paul Wallace (1943). The Wisconsin Pine Lands of Cornell University. Ithaca: Cornell University Press. OCLC 559384503.
