= List of duels in the United States =

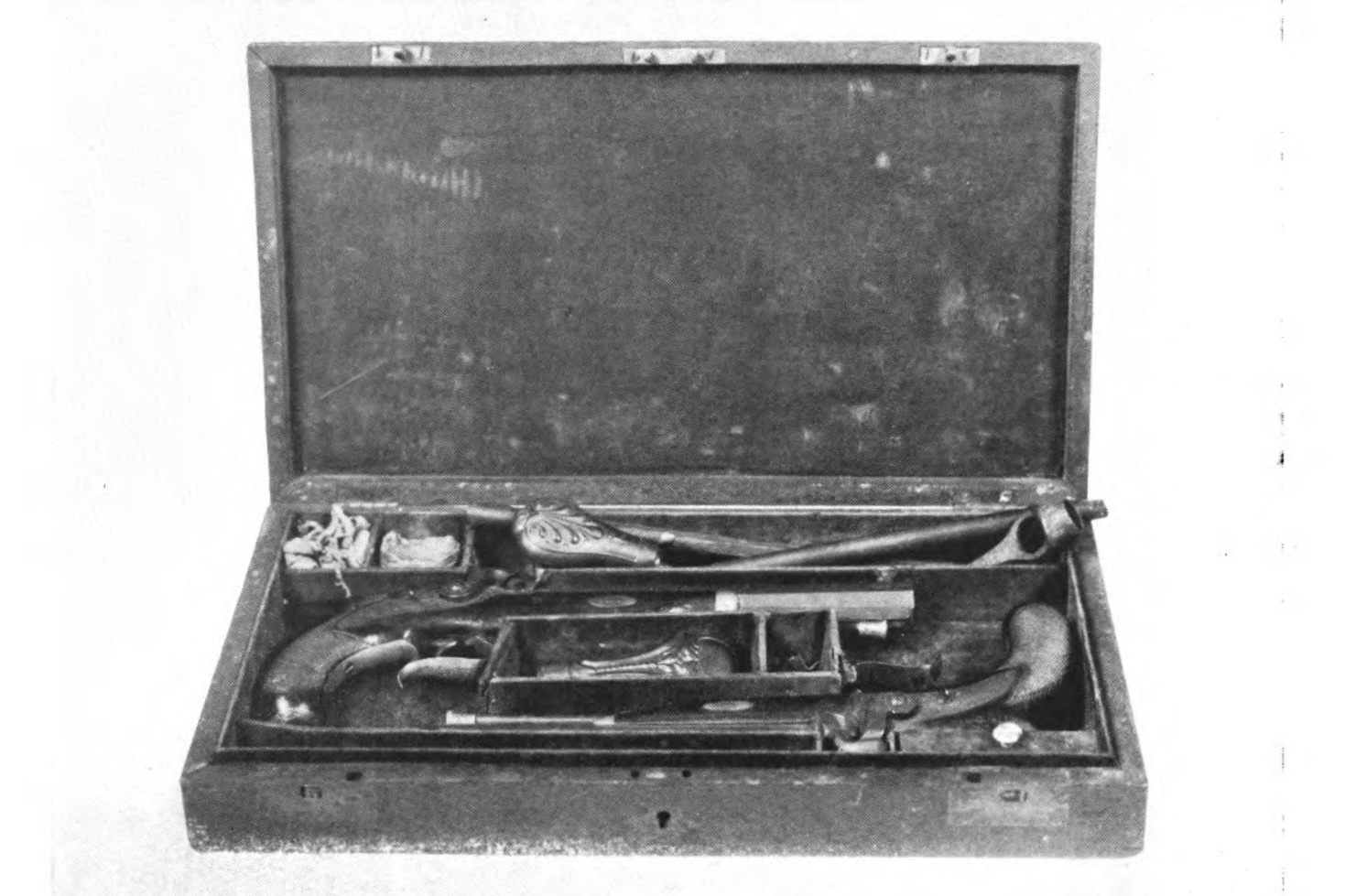
Dueling pistols, Savannah, Georgia

This is a list of duels in the United States, which in their day were often called affrays or rencontres.

- May 16, 1777: Button Gwinnett, a signer of the Declaration of Independence, dueled his political opponent Lachlan McIntosh; both were wounded, and Gwinnett died three days later.
- July 4, 1778: John Cadwalader, a brigadier General in the Continental Army challenged Thomas Conway, a former general in the same, to a duel. Cadwalader was a supporter of George Washington's and was angered by what he perceived as Conway's disloyal conduct to Washington as a member of the Conway Cabal. The duel was fought with pistols. Cadwalader's shot struck Conway in the mouth and passed through the back of his head. Conway miraculously survived and went on to apologize to Washington.
- August 30, 1778: Robert Howe, an officer in the Continental Army, shot Christopher Gadsden, a politician from South Carolina, in the ear during a duel.
- December 24, 1778: John Laurens dueled fellow Continental Army officer General Charles Lee. Lee was wounded and Laurens was unharmed. Lee had previously participated in a duel while working as a mercenary in Poland in 1765, in which he was wounded and his opponent killed.
- June 22, 1793: James Lamberton shot and killed John Duncan in a duel in Carlisle, Pennsylvania; Duncan was the father of future Natchez nabob Stephen Duncan and brother of future Pennsylvania chief justice Thomas Duncan.
- February 3, 1801: Future U.S. Senator John Rowan shot and killed Dr. James Chambers in the second fire of a duel in Bardstown, Kentucky. Future Secretary of the Treasury George M. Bibb was Rowan's second.
- July 31, 1802: Future Treasury Secretary William H. Crawford duels and kills Georgia's "Western Circuit" solicitor-general Peter L. Van Allen on the South Carolina side of the Savannah River.
- November 24, 1801: Philip Hamilton, son of the former U.S. Secretary of Treasury, dueled George I. Eacker; Hamilton was killed.
- September 5, 1802: John Stanly shot and killed Founding Father and former North Carolina Governor Richard Dobbs Spaight in a duel in New Bern.
- July 11, 1804: U.S. Vice President Aaron Burr, while in office, dueled former U.S. Secretary of the Treasury Alexander Hamilton; Hamilton was killed.
- February 14, 1805: Micajah Green Lewis, political aide, in-law of territorial governor W. C. C. Claiborne, and recent Princeton graduate was shot and killed in a duel at New Orleans by Robert Sterry, son of slave trader Cyprian Sterry, recent Brown graduate, and future American diplomat.
- May 30, 1806: Andrew Jackson and Charles Dickinson. Dickinson was killed, and Jackson wounded. Upon his inauguration to the presidency in 1829, Jackson became the only U.S. president to have killed a man in a duel.

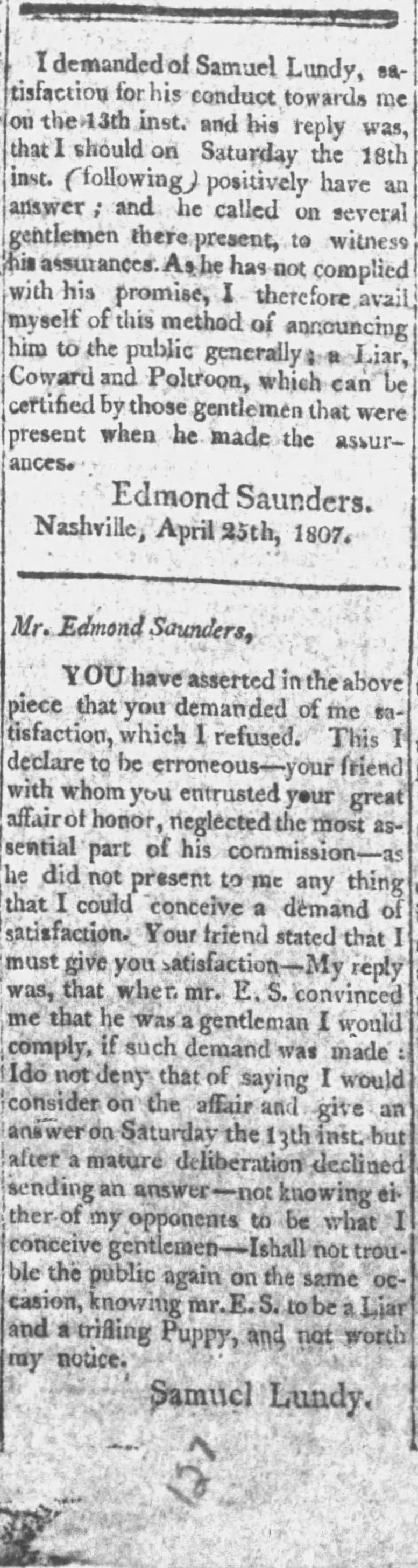
Duel challenge in a Nashville newspaper; a poltroon is a "wretched coward" (1807)

- November 30, 1806: Plantation owner and militia officer Benjamin Farar Jr. and merchant and militia officer Ferdinand L. Claiborne dueled at the Vidalia sandbar on the Mississippi River.
- January 19, 1819: Kentuckians Humphrey Marshall and Henry Clay dueled across the state line in Indiana; Clay was shot in the thigh on the third fire.
- September 25, 1810: Lawyer and future Louisiana state legislator Stephen A. Hopkins shot recently resigned U.S. attorney for Louisiana Philip Grymes through the chest in a duel at Manchac, West Florida.
- July 7, 1811: George Poindexter and Abijah Hunt dueled in Mississippi Territory; Hunt died of his wounds on July 10.
- 1814 or 1815: Current and past United States Attorneys for the District of Louisiana John Dick and John Grymes dueled over Grymes' private-practice work for the slave-smuggling privateers the Lafitte brothers; the duel was presumably in the vicinity of New Orleans, both parties reportedly took bullets to the leg.
- August 12, 1817: Thomas Hart Benton and Charles Lucas, attorneys on opposite sides of a court battle, dueled on the famous Bloody Island after Lucas challenged Benton's right to vote and Benton accused Lucas of being a "puppy"; Lucas was shot in the throat and Benton shot in the leg, upon which Benton released Lucas from his obligation.
- September 27, 1817: Benton and Lucas rematch, again on Bloody Island; Benton challenged Lucas after Lucas said the first fight at 30 ft (9.1 m) was unfair because Benton was a better shot. Benton killed Lucas at nine feet and was unhurt.
- February 6, 1819: Former U.S. Senator Armistead T. Mason shot and killed in a duel at Bladensburg by his second cousin, John Mason McCarty.
- July 16, 1819: Subsequent to an argument at a militia muster on the Fourth of July, Kentucky militia general Jacob Holman and militia colonel Francis G. Waring dueled in Franklin County, Kentucky. Waring was killed instantly, Holman was shot in the hip and disabled for life.
- March 22, 1820: Stephen Decatur and James Barron dueled; Decatur was killed.

Non-combat U.S. Army casualties of 1821 in the Deep South (Nashville Republican Banner, August 29, 1821)

- August 9, 1821: Two officers of the U.S. Treasury Department, Edward J. Fox and Henry Randall, duel just outside of Georgetown, District of Columbia. Randall died from a shot through the heart at eight paces.
- June 18, 1822: First of four duels between George McDuffie and Francis Cumming over the electoral prospects of William H. Crawford.
- June 30, 1823: Joshua Barton and Thomas C. Rector dueled on Bloody Island. Barton's brother, Senator David Barton, sought to block the reappointment of Rector's brother, William Rector, to the position of surveyor general for Missouri, Illinois, and Arkansas. Barton was killed and Rector unhurt.
- March 1825: Robert A. Beall of Augusta, Georgia, dueled Thomas D. Mitchell over "remarks." Shots were fired, no one was injured.
- September 1825: Planter and state legislator John Joor dueled Mississippi state judge Joshua Child at Woodville, Mississippi; both "severely" wounded but survived.
- March 1826: At Hamburg, South Carolina, across the Savannah River from Augusta, Thomas D. Mitchell shot and killed Dr. Ambrose Baber, who had been the surgeon on Beall's side in the Beall-Mitchell duel the year prior.
- April 26, 1826: Henry Clay and John Randolph of Roanoke dueled at Pimmit Run, Virginia. Both men were unhurt.
- September 22, 1826: U.S. Representative Sam Houston of Tennessee severely wounded General William A. White in a pistol duel near Franklin, Kentucky, over the patronage political appointment of the Nashville Postmaster.
- September 19, 1827: A duel between Samuel Levi Wells III and Dr. Thomas Harris Maddox turned into a brawl involving notable figures such as Jim Bowie.
- October 29, 1827: Robert Crittenden of Kentucky killed Henry Wharton Conway of Tennessee in Arkansas Territory; the duel resulted from charges of corruption made during a campaign for territorial office.
- November 5, 1827: North Carolina Congressmen Robert B. Vance and Samuel Carson dueled at the Saluda Gap; Vance died of his wounds the following day.
- January 25, 1828: George W. Crawford, then attorney general for the state of Georgia, killed Georgia state legislator member Thomas E. Burnside (Ambrose Burnside's uncle) in a duel, answering Crawford's challenge over published defamation of Crawford's father which Burnside had written.
- 1829: Judge Isaac Caldwell dueled John R. Peyton on the Robinson Road in Mississippi, after Peyton cast the deciding vote that established Jackson as state capital over Clinton. "Both men escaped uninjured."
- October 29, 1829: Charles Wickliffe, son of local slave owner Robert Wickliffe, and newspaper editor George James Trotter, son of gunpowder merchant George Trotter Jr., dueled on the line between Fayette County and Scott County, Kentucky; Wickliffe was killed on the second fire.
- August 26, 1831: Thomas Biddle and Missouri Congressman Spencer Darwin Pettis dueled on the Mississippi's Bloody Island. Biddle challenged Pettis for comments about Biddle's brother, Nicholas Biddle, who was president of the bank of the United States. Both men were mortally wounded after firing from five feet.
- January 23, 1832: Major J. T. Camp killed Georgia state Senator Sowell Woolfolk in a duel near Columbus, Georgia.
- August 10, 1832: Savannah physician Philip Minis shot and killed Georgia state legislator James Stark, after which Minis claimed that a valid duel had occurred. Minis also claimed his right to self-defense, saying he had not agreed to the duel and that he shot Stark to save his own life. Minis was found not guilty by a jury. While it is not clearly eligible to be on this list, the deceased had claimed his shooting and threatening fell under the law of duels, which is legally giving permission for his opponent to take shelter in the law of duels.
- September 25, 1832: James Westcott and Thomas Baltzell; Baltzell unhurt, Westcott injured but survived to become a U.S. Senator.
- July 14, 1834: Alexander Keith McClung kills Mississippi state representative Augustus Albert Allen in a duel at Jackson.
- January 12, 1836: Mississippi judge Isaac Caldwell killed by Samuel Gwin of the Government Land Office in Clinton, Mississippi; Gwin died in 1838 in part due injuries suffered in the same duel.
- February 5, 1837: Texan brigadier general Albert Sidney Johnston was shot in a duel over military position with Felix Huston.
- February 24, 1838: U.S. Representative from Kentucky William Jordan Graves killed U.S. Representative from Maine Jonathan Cilley in a pistol duel. Afterwards, Congress passed a law making it illegal to issue or accept a duel challenge in Washington, D.C.
- December 12, 1839: Florida militia brigadier general Leigh Read and Colonel Augustus A. Alston, a Whig Party leader, dueled with rifles at 15 paces. Read had been challenged twice by Alston, an overconfident duelist, and unexpectedly killed Alston. Tallahassee Mayor Francis Eppes (as it happens, Thomas Jefferson's grandson) was elected in large part to put down dueling and other lawlessness in the territory. Read was assassinated by Alston's brother in April 1841.
- September 18, 1839: Pierre Bossier killed Francois Gainnie in a duel in Louisiana.
- 1842: S. S. Prentiss dueled Tilghman Mayfield Tucker.
- July 11, 1842: New York newspaper editor James Watson Webb slightly injured in the leg in a Wilmington, Delaware duel with U.S. Representative Thomas F. Marshall of Kentucky.
- September 22, 1842: Abraham Lincoln, at the time an Illinois state legislator, accepted a challenge to a duel by Illinois state auditor James Shields. Lincoln apparently had published an inflammatory letter in a Springfield newspaper, the Sangamo Journal, that poked fun at Shields. Taking offense, Shields demanded "satisfaction" and the incident escalated with the two parties meeting on a Missouri island called Bloody Island, near Alton, Illinois, for the duel. Just prior to engaging in combat, the two participants' seconds intervened and were able to convince the two men to cease hostilities, on the grounds that Lincoln had not written the letters.
- July 26, 1847: Albert Pike and John Selden Roane dueled, resulting in a draw, with no injuries.
- August 20, 1852: Newspaper editors John L. Marling and Felix Zellicoffer duel in Nashville over the presidential election; both were slightly injured and survived.
- June 1, 1853: U.S. Senator William McKendree Gwin and U.S. Congressman J. W. McCorkle dueled, with no injuries.
- August 26, 1856: Benjamin Gratz Brown and Thomas C. Reynolds dueled on Bloody Island, in what would be called the "Duel of the Governors". Brown was then the abolitionist editor of the St. Louis Democrat and Reynolds a pro-slavery St. Louis district attorney. Brown was shot in the leg, which caused him to limp for the rest of his life, while Reynolds was unhurt. Brown would later become the Union-sanctioned governor of Missouri and Reynolds a Confederate governor of Missouri.
- May 17, 1859: Henry Gray Vick and James Stith duel with Kentucky rifles four days before Vick's wedding; Vick killed on the first fire. Possibly took place on grounds of Holly's Garden. Last duel in Mobile, Alabama.
- September 13, 1859: U.S. Senator David C. Broderick and former Chief Justice of the Supreme Court of California David S. Terry dueled; Terry killed Broderick.
- September 5, 1862: Confederate major Alfred M. Rhett, son of Fire-Eater Robert Barnwell Rhett, shot and killed Confederate colonel William Ransom Colhoun (a kinsman of John C. Calhoun), his commanding officer at Fort Sumter.
- September 6, 1863: Brig. Gen. Lucius Marshall Walker, the nephew of President James K. Polk, and General John Sapington Marmaduke, the future governor of Missouri, dueled over differences on the Confederate battlefield at the battles of Helena and Reed's Bridge in Arkansas. The duel took place at 6 am near the north bank of the Arkansas River, just outside Little Rock (now within eyesight of the Clinton Presidential Library). Both men missed their first shots, but Marmaduke mortally wounded Walker with his second shot. Walker died the next day.
- July 21, 1865: "Wild Bill" Hickok and Davis Tutt, dueled in Springfield, Missouri. Hickok had lost a pocket watch to Tutt in a card game, and when he demanded its return, Tutt refused. Tutt was shot and killed. The confrontation is often remembered as the first instance of two gunmen participating in a quick-draw duel.
- July 22, 1867: John Bull killed Langford Peel in a quick-draw duel in Salt Lake City, Utah. Peel challenged Bull after the two argued about their business, an argument which culminated in Peel slapping Bull. Bull reasoned that he did not have a gun, but Peel told him to get his own and come back. Peel waited in the saloon for an hour but left, not knowing that Bull had not refused his offer but was simply late. After meeting again in another saloon, the two drew their weapons and Bull gunned down Peel.
- July 14, 1873: Newspaper editor R. Barnwell Rhett Jr. killed Louisiana judge William H. Cooley in a duel held near New Orleans.
- March 9, 1877: Gamblers Jim Levy and Charlie Harrison dueled in a saloon in Cheyenne, Wyoming. Levy challenged Harrison to take it outside, Harrison agreed, and the two squared off in the street. Western novelist James Reasoner claimed in Esquire that this was "the most 'Hollywood' showdown". During the duel, Harrison shot wild, while Levy took more careful aim and shot Harrison. Levy had previously participated in another quick-draw duel with gunfighter Michael Casey, who had challenged him in an alleyway in Pioche, Nevada.
- March 22, 1882: Wyatt Earp killed an outlaw named Florentino "Indian Charlie" Cruz in a duel in the Dragoon Mountains of southeastern Arizona. Although the actual events are still debated by historians, Earp left his own account claiming that after capturing Cruz, Earp told Cruz to face him and draw his weapon. Earp ended up gunning down Cruz.
- June 7, 1882: Louisiana State Treasurer Edward A. Burke was seriously wounded by C. Harrison Parker, editor of the New Orleans Daily Picayune, in a duel with pistols. After Parker published unflattering remarks about Burke, Burke challenged him to a duel.
- February 8, 1887: Jim Courtright was killed by Luke Short during a quick-draw duel in Fort Worth, Texas.

== See also ==
- List of Confederate duels
- List of Old West gunfights
- Dueling in the Southern United States
- List of violent incidents involving Andrew Jackson
- List of assassinated American politicians
- List of members of the United States Congress killed or wounded in office
- List of United States federal judges killed in office
- List of United States presidential assassination attempts and plots
