= Augustus Albert Allen =

Mississippi lawyer (1810–1834)

- Born: c. 1810; Virginia
- Died: July 14, 1834; Mississippi

Augustus Albert Allen (c. 1810–July 14, 1834), also known as Gen. A. A. Allen and "Baron Allen," was an American lawyer and politician. Originally from Virginia, he was at one time a cadet at the United States Military Academy at West Point. He settled in Mississippi in the 1830s and worked as a lawyer, banker, and land dealer. He was elected to the state legislature from Hinds County in 1833. He was killed in a duel with Alexander Keith McClung in 1834.

== Life and career ==
Allen was born around 1810. He was said to be from Virginia. He entered West Point on July 1, 1828, at age 17, and was ranked 59 of 59 in his class that year, with 11 listed below him as either "found deficient" or "sick absent". He was in the same class as George B. Crittenden, George Washington Cass, and Philip St. George Cocke.

Allen was enrolled at the United States Military Academy at West Point in 1829–1830, when future Confederate general John Bankhead Magruder, at that time captain of the 1st Company of Cadets, "called upon Cadet Private Augustus Albert Allen to close up ranks. 'Baron' Allen, as he was known to his classmates, considered the command a personal insult, for which he demanded an apology." Not immediately receiving one, Allen challenged Magruder to a duel, which Magruder accepted even though duels were prohibited under Academy regulations. Magruder's second, William N. Pendleton, ultimately acted as mediator and resolved the conflict, without gunfire, to the satisfaction of all parties. In July 1830, Cadet Allen attended a dinner hosted by Philip P. Barbour at Lynchburg and toasted to the ex-presidents of the United States. He did not graduate from the academy.

In 1833 he was a commissioner selling building lots in the Mississippi state capital of Jackson. He was on the board of directors of a Jackson bank in July 1833. In 1833 he was elected to the Mississippi House of Representatives from Hinds County.

In January 1834 Allen's primary occupation was lawyer. In June 1834, along with Isaac Caldwell (killed in an 1836 duel) and others, Allen was investigating public land sales at the Chocchuma land office. In July 1834, Kentucky-born lawyer Alexander Keith McClung shot Allen in the mouth from 34 ft (10 m). McClung's shot amputated Allen's tongue and smashed "several teeth...leaving a horrific wound from which he died in great agony." McClung's shot "set a record for a death by smoothbore pistol at roughly 100 paces." As many as 3,000 people, including 150 state legislators, were present at the Jackson dueling grounds to witness this event. S. S. Prentiss and Felix Huston were apparently Allen's seconds in the duel, which was held on the banks of the Pearl River.

== See also ==
- Title and rank in the antebellum U.S. South
- List of duels in the United States
- List of United States Military Academy non-graduate alumni

== Sources ==
- Prichard, Jim (April 2008). "A Killing Gentleman" (PDF). Kentucky Humanities. pp. 27–32. ISSN 1554-6284.
- Settles, Thomas (2009). John Bankhead Magruder: A Military Reappraisal. Genealogy by Kimberly C. Campbell. Baton Rouge: LSU Press. ISBN 978-0-8071-4962-1. LCCN 2008034611. Project MUSE book 16583.
