= DeSoto Island =

Mississippi River landform

Coordinates: 32.3558°N 90.8863°W

DeSoto Island is a Mississippi River island near the confluence of the River and Glass Bayou just north of Vicksburg, in the jurisdiction of Madison Parish, Louisiana, United States. In the 19th century it was known as the Duelling Island because duelists went there to conduct their "affairs of honor." Among the notable duels conducted there, some of which attracted great crowds, were shootouts between Seargent S. Prentiss and Henry S. Foote, and "Mr. Cunningham of South Carolina" and Alexander Duvall, and the duel where the "Black Knight of the South," Alexander K. McClung, killed John Menifee, brother of Kentucky congressman Richard H. Menifee. Covered in brush and willows, the island was also reputed to serve as a hideout for bandits who were wanted by the law.

== See also ==
- Kangaroo, Vicksburg
- Bloody Island (Mississippi River)
- Dueling in the Southern United States
- Dueling Oaks
