= Alexander Keith McClung =

American duelist (1811–1855)

Alexander McClung
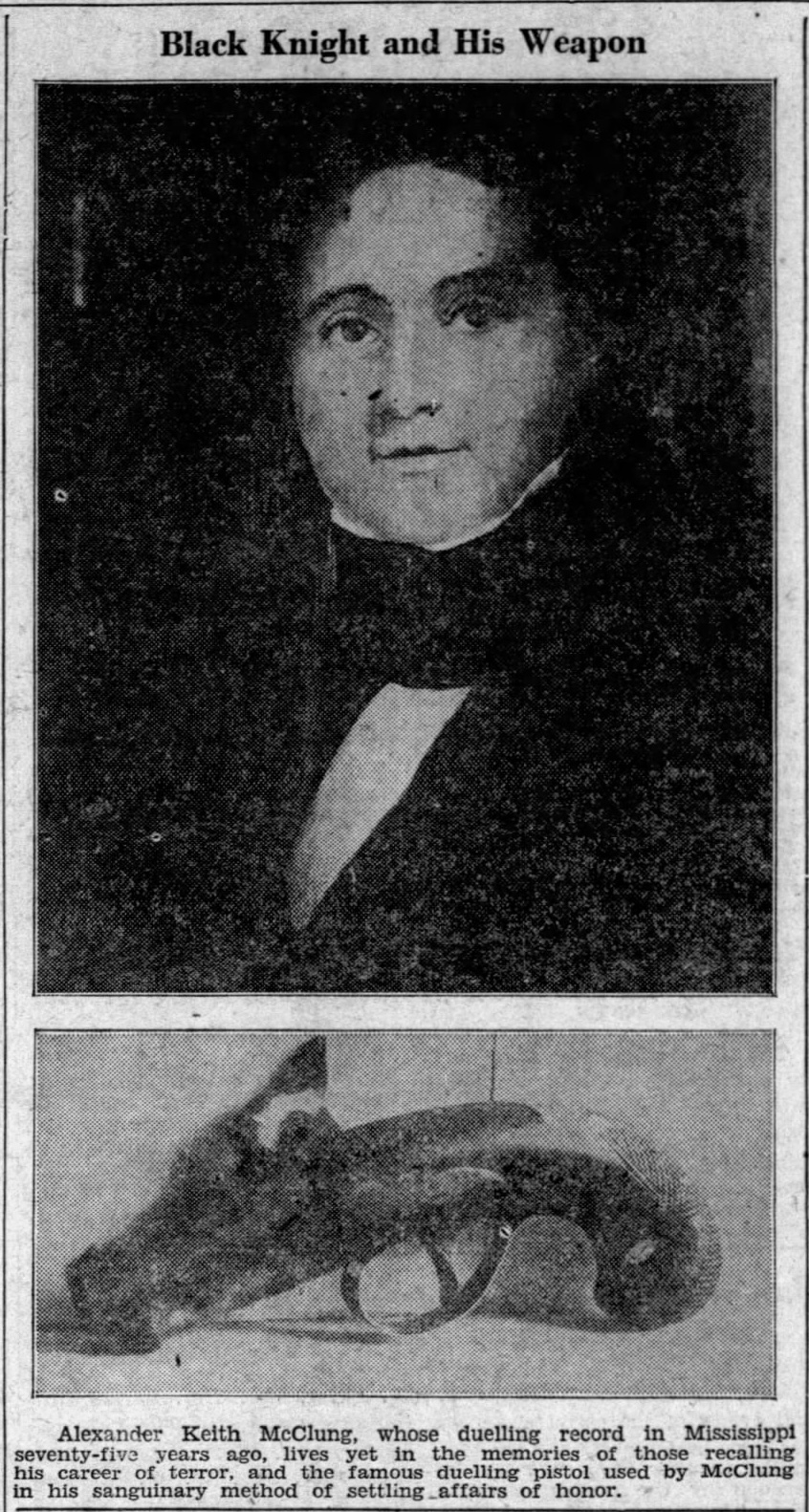
- "Black Knight and His Weapon" Clarion-Ledger, Jackson, Mississippi, October 6, 1929; this is possibly the derringer with which he committed suicide

2nd United States Ambassador to Bolivia
- In office 1849–1851
- President: Zachary Taylor; Millard Fillmore
- Preceded by: John Appleton
- Succeeded by: Horace H. Miller

Personal details
- Born: June 14, 1811 Fauquier County, Virginia
- Died: March 23, 1855 (aged 43) Jackson, Mississippi
- Citizenship: United States
- Relations: John Marshall (uncle)

Military service
- Allegiance: United States
- Branch/service: United States Army
- Years of service: 1846–48
- Rank: Lieutenant colonel
- Battles/wars: Mexican-American War

Alexander Keith McClung (June 14, 1811 – March 23, 1855) was an attorney from Vicksburg, Mississippi, U.S. marshal for the Northern District of Mississippi, a lieutenant colonel of the Mississippi Rifles during the Mexican-American War, and briefly chargé d'affaires to Bolivia in President Zachary Taylor's administration. He is best known today for his participation in a series of antebellum duels, or gunfights. He became a folkloric figure of the 19th-century United States, a dead shot with mental health problems known as "the Black Knight of the South," with claims made to the effect that he killed 18 people, or participated in 14 duels and had killed 10 men, or killed seven brothers in one family. (The historical record suggests four duels with two killings. A New History of Mississippi states that by the end of his term as U.S. marshal he "had probably killed 10 men.")

Born the seventh child of a Kentucky judge and "the most brilliant" female scion of the Marshall political family, McClung moved to Mississippi in 1832, where he built a lonely, storied, troubled life. He considered himself "Death's Ramrod." Amongst his contemporaries, he was considered a courageous soldier, a passionate Whig (devoted to Henry Clay, and opposed to Andrew Jackson), an excellent writer, an excellent shot, sensitive, melancholic, Byronic, erratic, alcoholic, and eventually, insane. He died by self-inflicted gunshot in a Mississippi boarding house in 1855, leaving a Romantic poem as a suicide note.

== Early life and naval career ==
McClung was born in Fauquier County, Virginia, and was the nephew of United States Chief Justice John Marshall. His father was William Alexander McClung, and his mother was Sarah Tarleton Marshall. Judge McClung was a Virginia native, related to the Breckinridges, who represented Kentucky in the Virginia legislature, represented Nelson County in the Kentucky Senate from 1796 to 1800, and attended the Constitutional Convention that met in Danville, Kentucky, in 1787. Sarah Marshall was remembered as the "brilliant daughter of distinguished Revolutionary War veteran Col. Thomas Marshall...Susan was carrying her seventh child when she left her Mason County home in 1811 to visit a gravely ill sister in Virginia. That memorable year witnessed the birth of a son, Alexander Keith, on June 14th in the Old Dominion, and the death of her husband on their Kentucky estate that same summer." Several of McClung's siblings died young.

At age 14, he was sent to a "classical school conducted in Woodford Co., Ky., by his uncle, Dr. Louis Marshall. To escape punishment he leaped from a second-story window and fled to his home in Mason County. He attended the New York Naval Academy, where he once threatened fellow student Benjamin F. Sands at sword point. He was commissioned as a midshipman on April 1, 1828. He set sail on the USS Vandalia (1828) on October 15, 1828, and promptly showed further evidence of behavioral issues, getting into a fight with fellow midshipman J. T. Williams. At the port of Montevideo, Uruguay, his first duel was with midshipman Addison C. Hinton, later of the Republic of Texas Navy. Hinton wounded McClung in the arm, McClung nicked Hinton's thumb. McClung's naval career ended August 20, 1829, when his captain put him ashore in Buenos Aires, Argentina. Upon returning to Kentucky, he initially studied medicine but then turned to the law. His second duel was in Frankfort, Kentucky, opposite his cousin James W. Marshall; he fired into the air, concluding the matter of honor. There may or may not have been another shooting in here somewhere. A Marshall cousin wrote in the 1880s, "I know little of the circumstances under which he killed Baker." The McClungs deny the claim that he killed a man named Baker.

== Mississippi duels ==
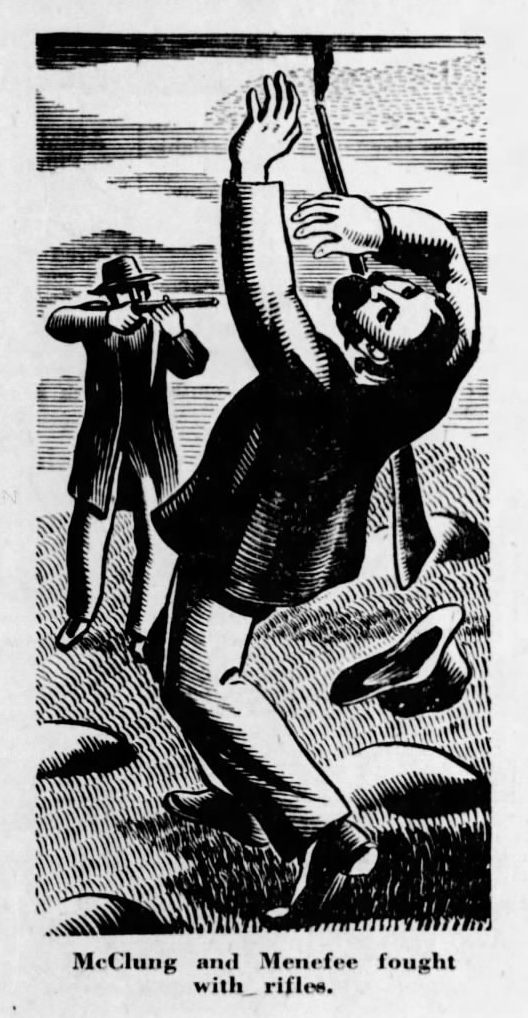
Orville Carroll illustration, 1942; A New History of Mississippi described this incident as "probably not a duel"

McClung moved first to Columbus, in northeastern Mississippi, in about 1832. He began working as a "not too successful" attorney but regardless of his lawyering skill he still managed to move within the circle of the state's most prominent politicians. Regarding his legal career, "A Mississippian" writing in the Southern Literary Messenger in 1855 commented, "notwithstanding his acknowledged talents and decided professional acumen, we have not been able to learn that he took any prominent stand at the bar, or transacted any considerable amount of professional business." Moving further south in 1833, in short order he served as "second" to Henry S. Foote in a duel with Sergeant S. Prentiss. At this duel, one of the typically baroque Southern duel cycles of gossip, rumor, slander, and melodrama was kicked off, in this case involving one Gen. Allen and a man named George W. Coffee. Thus, on July 14, 1834, McClung dueled and killed Mississippi state legislator Augustus Albert Allen. The duel was on the banks of the Pearl River, and McClung shot Allen in the mouth from 34 feet (10 m). McClung's shot amputated Allen's tongue and smashed "several teeth...leaving a horrific wound from which he died in great agony." As many as 3,000 people were present at the Jackson duelling grounds to witness this event.

In 1837 there was supposed to be a fight between McClung and H. C. Stewart, with the weapons being 16 in (41 cm) knives but McClung "absolutely refused to agree to the binding of their respective left arms with cords. Gentlemen, he contended, did not bind themselves like slaves and criminals. While the duel never took place, the barbaric terms were circulated in the Northern press as yet another example of Southern savagery."

McClung killed 24-year-old John L. Menefee in 1838. Menefee's first name is variously listed as George, James, and John W., and the family spelling was Menefee although the press generally used Menifee. He was a Vicksburg merchant, and he was the brother of Kentucky congressman Richard H. Menefee, and he was killed on "the second fire" of a duel with Mississippi rifles in Vicksburg in December 1838. The lead-up to the Menefee shooting involved Menefee and George Coffee ("McClung's old enemy") finding the completely inebriated McClung alone and unarmed in a tavern and "savagely beating" him with a pool cue to the point that they fractured his skull. This action led to the duel. As many as 700 people had ridden over to DeSoto Island, the "duelling island" across from Vicksburg, in boats to witness the shootout. Menefee was not killed directly by a bullet, but rather McClung's bullet hit the body of Menefee's gun and either a fragment of the hammer or half of the bullet entered above his right eye, or he was killed when a wooden splinter of the rifle stock cut through his neck. The crowd was against McClung, as Menefee was personally popular, and "the callous sporting crowd had reportedly bet heavily against McClung," since Menefee was a member of the local militia and was known for his excellent shooting skills. Menefee's unit, the Vicksburg Rifles, had all come to the dueling grounds to have a picnic and watch. Nearly 50 years later, in 1886, Menefee was still remembered by a Vicksburg booster as "one of the most brilliant and popular men in the State." After Menefee's death, other Menefees reportedly sought out McClung and he "fought seven of them killing three of the number and wounding the balance." Another version has it that, "As an aftermath, he was forced to methodically slay all six of his victim's brothers, one by one, in the order which they challenged him. One perfectly good family, 'shot to hell'—literally." The McClung family history claimed that his "formidable reputation saved him from ever again being challenged.

Writing in December 1854, "A Mississippian" described McClung's history of dueling:

On two occasions, since his residence in Mississippi, he has felt it to be his duty to meet an adversary at the fatal peg, under the stinging impression that his honor and pride of character had been too deeply wounded to be satisfied with a less stern arbitrament. Fighting is with him, when once fixed in mind, no child's play, and aught else than a mere means of ostentation and display of nerve. He is the last man among all we have known, who would condescend to seek notoriety, or to feign a resentment he does not feel; nor has he ever fought a bloodless duel. He has once been severely wounded himself. Both of his conflicts in this State resulted in the death of his antagonists. The character of the parties for courage and resolution of purpose, forbade all hope of any other result than death, when once a tight had been determined. Erery body knew that when such men went out fight. that a funeral would follow. The injuries received by the challenger, as he conceived, were such as to require a mortal conflict: the temperament of the challenged was opposed to the conciliatory in presence of such a foe. All were brave, gallant men, all Kentuckians, and all admired for their chivalry and many noble qualities.

Another account, spun one hundred years after McClung's death, claimed that he killed 18 men, including some conniving gamblers killed in partnership with Jim Bowie in a brawl on the deck of a steamboat, and that the names of 18 victims "are known" (but this account does not name them). His reputed double-digit kill count is possibly predominantly folkloric and not factual, as there is no secondary evidence of McClung killing a succession of Menefees in the wake of their brother's death, etc., but such statements cling to McClung's reputation nonetheless.

== Politics ==
McClung was noted for his editorial attacks on the Martin Van Buren presidential administration of 1836 to 1840; Van Buren was Jackson's hand-picked successor and was considered by the Whigs to be a dependent tool of his predecessor. McClung was named editor of the Southern Sun newspaper in 1840. From 1841 to 1845, McClung was U.S. marshal for the United States District Court for the Northern District of Mississippi. During this period there are hints of a failed courtship of Virginia Caroline Tunstall, later Mrs. Clement Claiborne Clay. They met in Columbus while she was visiting an aunt, Mrs. Fort. She reportedly said that she both loved him and feared him, and he was prone to stunts like threatening to drive their carriage into the river unless she agreed to marry him. She said yes, made him drive her home, told him the next day that her "yes" was made under duress, and "fearful...fled by stagecoach to Tuscaloosa," and never saw him again, marrying Clay shortly thereafter. Some 40 years after the fact a New York newspaper told a possibly apocryphal proto-Old West story about McClung, which may have had its origins in his marshal days:

One day [McClung] rode up to an inn in a little Mississippi town. While he was dismounting, a notorious bully and desperado of that country, who had killed many men and was the terror of that region, was on the inside with his revolver cocked and a watch in his hand. He had ordered the room cleared in five minutes and every man had gone, although all were fighting men. When McClung entered the bully faced him, and with a big oath informed him of the facts, and that there were only three minutes left before he should kill whoever remained. McClung without moving a muscle or drawing a weapon produced his watch, glanced at it and said: "My name is Alexander McClung. I give you ten seconds to get out of here or you are a dead man." The fellow yelled out, "By ——, colonel, one-half of that time will do," and he was out in two seconds.

McClung ran The True Issue newspaper in Jackson, Mississippi in 1844. The following year, he "stumped Lowndes County" for a seat in the Mississippi House of Representatives and lost the election but "established his reputation as a skilled, dramatic orator."

== Mexican–American War ==
McClung served as lieutenant colonel of the 1st Mississippi Regiment during the Mexican–American War. Originally captain of the Tombigbee Volunteers, Company K, which was named for the Tombigbee River, the company was organized at Columbus, Mississippi, and included soldiers recruited from Monroe and Lowdnes Counties. He was elected to be lieutenant colonel, second in command, defeating major general of the 3rd division of the Mississippi militia John M. Duffield, and the captain of Raymond Fencibles (Company G) Reuben E. Downing. William P. Rogers took over as captain of Company K.

McClung's soldiers were frustrated by his decision-making on a steamboat trip up the Rio Grande in August–September 1846. Having one soldier go missing (he was picked up later) during what was supposed to be a brief stop at a woodlot for steamboat fuel, "McClung posted a guard whenever the Colonel Cross docked and forbade the men to leave the boat. On one occasion McClung even armed himself with a brace of pistols and threatened to shoot several volunteers attempting to leave the vessel to find some food suitable for their sick friends on board. His reputation as a duelist made it unlikely anyone took up his challenge. Officers, on the other hand, could come and go freely. The sight of them and their servants going ashore at stops to buy food from the local inhabitants angered the enlisted men." Enlisted men, even the sick, were kept on the deck while officers and their slaves were permitted to enter the cabins. A soldier "N" from the Carroll County Volunteers (Company D) wrote of McClung, "He is the most heartless man I ever saw." The Mississippi Rifles arrived in Carmargo and camped there until September 7, leaving behind them McClung's trunk, which could not fit on the progressing baggage train, and a disorderly camp with abandoned "tents, kettles, and even newly issued rifles" as well as Lieutenant Bostick, who "had been left by himself to care for nearly 100 sick men without any arrangements made for their provisions."

McClung commanded the right wing of the Mississippi Rifles at the Battle of Monterey, which included companies C, E, G, and K (Vicksburg Southrons, State Fencibles, Raymond Fencibles, and Tombigbee Volunteers). McClung was said to be the first man over the wall at La Tenería (transl. the Tannery; also known the Black Fort), and "close behind McClung were Lts. William Purnell Townsend and William H. H. Patterson and Pvt. Edward Gregory, all members of the Tombigbee Volunteers." He and his men were assaulting the second Mexican defensive line when he was struck by an enemy minié ball that "had entered the left hip, after tearing away a portion of the hand which rested on his scabbard, and passed out near the region of the spine." McClung spent the rest of the day wounded in a ditch; his absence was recognized at dusk and a group of his men found him and carried him to safety under a combined fusillade of bullets and rain. He lost two fingers by surgical amputation, the other two were rendered useless by the wound through the hand, only his thumb remained useful.

The battle kicked off a long-running feud between McClung and Mississippi politician Jefferson Davis. In the retelling of one historian, "In February 1847, Davis became involved in a serious dispute with his second-in-command, Major Alexander McClung, and with Colonel William Campbell of the First Tennessee, over who really deserved credit for the success of the attack at Buena Vista. Beside the falling out with his second-in-command, Major McClung, several officers complained about Davis' imperious nature. Davis for his part was so concerned about his public image and so determined to promote himself as a war hero that while home on leave he wrote an angry letter to a Mississippi newspaper that demanded that the editor retract a story that gave credit for the victories to the First Tennessee and its commander, Colonel William Campbell."

=== Honors ===
The 2nd Mississippi Rifles mustered for duty in 1847 at Camp McClung, named in honor of the wounded McClung, which was set up 2.5 mi (4.0 km) north of Vicksburg along the river below the Walnut Hills. In 1847, citizens of Columbus presented McClung with a ceremonial sword inscribed "'Presented to Lieut. Col. Alex'r. McClung, by the citizens of Lowndes County, Miss., for his gallantry at the battle of Monterey.' On the sword are the words uttered by the gallant Colonel, when making his charge on the Mexican defences, 'Tombigbee Volunteers, follow me.'" As of 1904 the sword was in the possession of Mrs. Harrison T. McClung of St. Paul, Minnesota.

== Chargé d'affaires in Bolivia ==
McClung was announced as a candidate for the U.S. Congress from Mississippi in 1847. Both Jefferson Davis and McClung ran for office late year, based on their records in the war, and squabbled in print over who took what actions in combat. Davis, a Democrat, was sent up to the U.S. Senate. McClung, a Whig, failed to win to a seat in the U.S. House of Representatives, losing his race to Winfield Scott Featherston, a Democrat and fellow veteran of the Mexican-American War. In 1848 the Mississippi Free Trader criticized McClung's stump speaking style as mediocre. His writing, however, was said to be superlative. McClung supported Zachary Taylor for president in 1848 and as a reward was granted the "scantest crumbs of political patronage—the post of chargé d'affaires to Bolivia. Many of his friends advised him to refuse the position. McClung, who was in dire financial straits, swallowed his pride and accepted the mission on May 29, 1849."

According to "A Mississippian" in 1855, "The duties of his office were mainly confined to witnessing some stirring popular outbreaks and some political executions, exchanging conventional hospitalities with brother ambassadors, and paying a few stated visits to the trembling head of the government." He presented his credentials to the Bolivian government on July 3, 1850. In 1851 he reportedly insulted the Bolivian foreign minister, and essentially recalled himself to the United States. He "notified the government of Bolivia from Cobija of his impending departure" on June 30, 1851.

While in Bolivia he may have killed "an overbearing Englishman." However, this claim "is by others denied," and New History of Mississippi deems it "rumor."

== Decline and death ==
Back in Mississippi, he was a vigorous campaigner for pro-Union candidates and against the possibility of secession from the United States over the issue of slavery, supporting his old ally Foote in an election against Jefferson Davis. Many decades later, a trio of old Confederates claimed that McClung and Davis despised each other, and Davis would deliberately needle McClung, hoping to prompt a duel challenge in which Davis would have chosen the weapons, and selected sabers, at which he was the superior fighter. (No challenge to Davis was ever sent by McClung.) In 1852 he was nominated, along with S. S. Boyd of Adams County, to serve as a Whig presidential elector, but refused to serve because he did not support Winfield Scott.

He was, however, notorious by this time for his bad credit, gambling, and drunkenness, had no remaining legal career to speak of, and had accumulated significant debts. On October 11, 1852, McClung delivered a eulogy for Henry Clay that was described as one of the greatest speeches ever made in Mississippi—despite McClung having been in what was called a "beastly state of intoxication" the night before. According to local residents, by the 1850s McClung had become a hopeless alcoholic and would fall asleep on emptied shipping crates stacked behind shops in the Mississippi state capital of Jackson, unconscious yet clutching a Bowie knife in his hand. According to Mrs. Sidney Stevens of Jackson, Mississippi in 1929, "Most of McClung's quarrels and debauches either occurred or originated in the saloon...on the corner of East Capitol and North State street, across the street from the Old Capitol. That was a favorite hangout for him." Reuben Davis recalled in his memoirs the terror of entering a restaurant with two friends and coming across McClung drinking alone but for the company of two guns and a knife laid out in front of him on the bar; Davis described McClung as "insane" by that time, prone to an alcohol-fueled psychosis and erratic, frightening words and actions. Davis and companions were fearful that a hasty exit would "insult" McClung, so they ordered and then consumed their white wine and oysters as quickly as possible, leaving the equally terrified (enslaved) waiter alone with McClung. The Atlantic reviewer of Reuben Davis' memoirs, John Torrey Morse, cited his retelling of this incident as evidence of a bizarre, theatrical, exceptionalist self-regard by white Southern patriarchs:

"As in the novels of Dickens, a sort of festal rill of liquors glides merrily through the pages, and the curse of the Anglo-Saxon race evidently lay heavy on those old Mississippians. Occasionally a glimpse of its deadly work is apparent. There is the story of McClung, a colonel of course, who, in the frenzy of delirium tremens, emptied a restaurant not only of guests but of attendants, and then seated himself in the banquet hall deserted, at the head of one of the long tables, with a bottle, a bowie-knife, and two dueling-pistols in quasi-military array before him. Unaware of this inconvenient status, Mr. Davis, Governor Clark, and Governor Alcorn entered, upon an innocent quest for oysters. A frightful scene ensued, and they narrowly escaped with their lives, and without the oysters. The exciting tale is most dramatically narrated, and it is with extreme regret that we find so racy and stirring an incident too long to be repeated. Certain it is that half a dozen skeletons at a feast would be more welcome than one McClung. It seems that the peril of the occasion was augmented by the memory of an occurrence at a ball-room, where Alcorn had kicked down-stairs a young man who had taken too much wine and was showing undue attention to a lady. McClung thought that the prior right to do this kicking inhered in him, and he never forgave Alcorn for getting ahead of him. Yet Davis liked McClung; the alcoholized colonel was a candidate for Congress and was defeated, and Davis tenderly says, 'Very possibly it is from this defeat, which he took much to heart, that we may date the first symptoms of that deep melancholy which afterwards clouded the noble spirit of McClung, and which culminated in the awful tragedy of his self-inflicted death'."

In 1855, McClung sought a new military officer's commission but, with his reputation in tatters, and his old rival Jefferson Davis running the U.S. Department of War under Franklin Pierce, none was forthcoming.

McClung used "a tiny, silver-mounted derringer" to commit suicide by self-inflicted gunshot in the Eagle Hotel in Jackson, Mississippi. According to Kentucky archivist and historian James M. Prichard, his planning for this event was elaborate: "He had previously asked a local carpenter to design a wooden plank with a deep notch in one end. After positioning the plank against his bed, he lay down so that his head rested in the v-shaped notch. He placed a small silver derringer against his head and pulled the trigger. The blood ran down the board so that not a single drop stained his fine clothes. Near his body lay a bit of melancholy verse entitled 'Ode to Death.'" McClung was interred in the burial plot of Nicholas D. Coleman, widower of his cousin, Lucy Ambler Marshall Coleman, at Cedar Hill Cemetery in Vicksburg, Warren County, Mississippi. According to a military graves registration form completed by American Legion volunteers in the 20th century, "Miss Estelle Coleman (cousin)" of Vicksburg was listed as his next of kin on his death certificate.

== Legacy ==
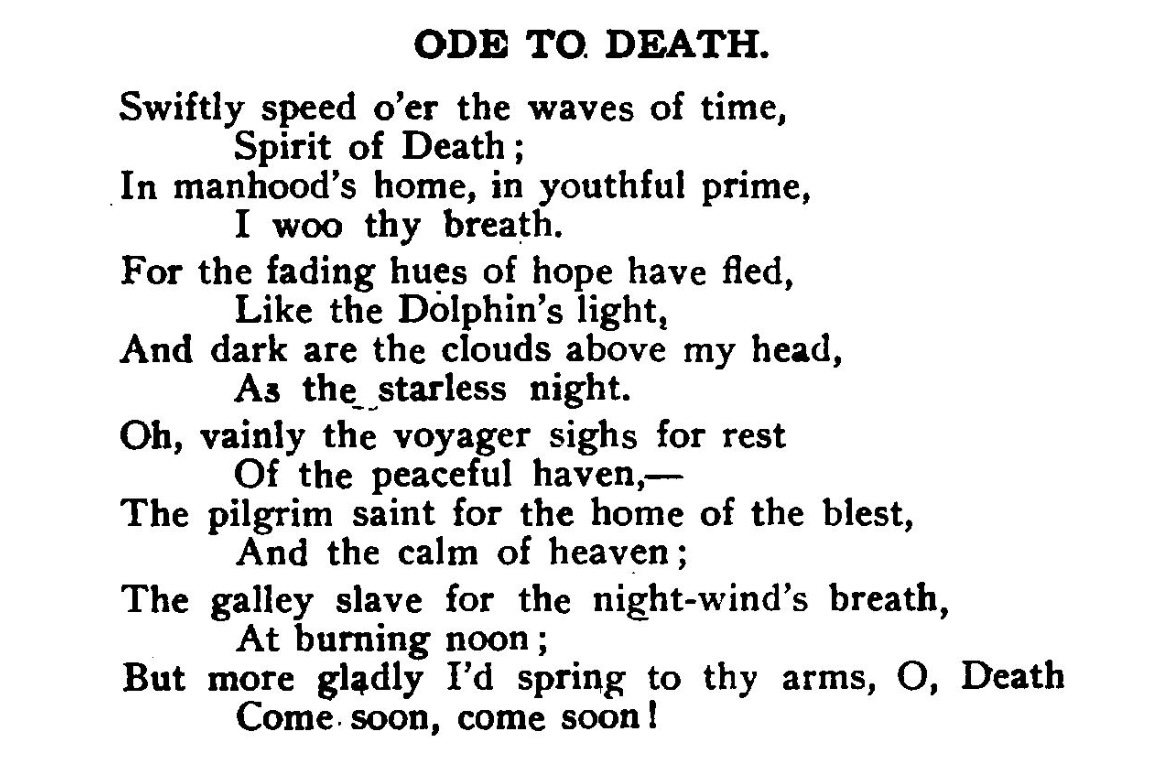
"Invocation to Death," suicide poem by Alexander K. McClung

A Smithsonian magazine article about American dueling described McClung as "a hard-drinking homicidal miscreant...[who] behaved like a character out of Gothic fiction." McClung lived at the intersection of an "elite male honor code" and a "poorly developed legal system" that "harbored some disturbed individuals." McClung's remarkable, troubled life and ultimate death by his own hand may have stemmed in part from a family history of untreated mood disorders and substance abuse. McClung's sister Charlotte McClung Woolfolk was remembered as a brilliant woman of "idiosyncrasies," who was possessed of a "delicate, quick and sensitive intuition, manifesting itself in prevision, bordering on prophesy," and who was "quite mad at the time of her early death in 1840." McClung's brother Rev. John A. McClung's death at Niagara Falls in 1859 was most likely a suicide. McClung's cousin, Thomas F. Marshall, also a duellist, drank himself to death in 1864. McClung's mother outlived her son by three years; in 1885, a nephew wrote of her, "Aunt McClung was, perhaps, the most intellectual of the daughters of Col. Thos. Marshall. Her mind possessed masculine powers, and she delighted to associate with people of culture. She combined intelligence with sweetness of temper, purity of thought and tenderness of heart. In the days of my childhood and orphanage, she was a mother to me. I delighted to read to her, and hear her comments. She was dignified and imposing in her manner; yet everybody loved her. Her reading was extensive, her information varied, and her conversation exceedingly interesting. When, in 1831 and 1832, I lived at the old haunted Orr mansion, perched on the Ohio bluff, with its solitary halls, lofty ceilings, and spacious corridors, she kindly took me to her room of nights, to allay my boyish fears of ghosts. In her long widowhood of 47 years, she was a welcome and honored visitor among her kindred."

Alexander McClung never married but according to a 1948 article in a Mississippi paper, "For many years the name McClung became an alibi for the spinsters of Columbus, who nimbly excused their single blessedness by remarking, 'You must realize, my dear, the reason I never married is because I loved Alexander McClung.'"

The nickname Black Knight of the South seems to have been developed posthumously, and may have been popularized by the title of a 1936 article by Craddock Goins in Esquire magazine. McClung reportedly referred to himself in letters as "Death's Ramrod." Regarding the longevity and persistence of McClung's legend, one Mississippi narrative about his life and death seemed to him imbue him with all of the original sins of the antebellum Southern white man: "Highly bred like the thoroughbred horses of his boyhood home, sensitive, intelligent, quick-tempered, ambitious, combatative and frustrated, Keith McClung grew up to acquire most of the virtues and nearly all the vices of the traditional Southern gentleman of his day. He was controversial and vain, with an exaggerated sense of chivalry and an adolescent notion that he must prove himself in the world by fighting continually." His well-known rivalry with Confederate President Jefferson Davis may have also contributed to the construction of his reputation in the Lost Cause-venerating post-war white South. The McClung family historian deemed him a victim of his time, writing, "Adherence to the false 'code of honor' which prevailed in his day was deemed more essential than brains and moral character for one who sought political preferment. McClung possessed a temperament which made him an easy victim of this heathenish and barbarous code."

== See also ==
- Dueling in the Southern United States
- List of ambassadors of the United States to Bolivia

== Sources ==
- Deitreich, Kenneth A. (2006). Honor, patriarchy, and disunion: Masculinity and the coming of the American Civil War (Thesis). Morgantown, West Virginia: West Virginia University. doi:10.33915/etd.4224.
- McClung, William (1904). The McClung Genealogy. Pittsburgh: McClung Publishing Company. OCLC 5148800. FHL 50350.
- Mississippian (January 1855). Thompson, John Reuben (ed.). "Sketches of Our Volunteer Officers: Alexander Keith McClung". Southern Literary Messenger. Vol. XXI, no. 1. Richmond, Virginia: Macfarlane Ferguson & Co. pp. 1–17. OCLC 1766194. Archived from the original on 2025-08-25 – via Making of America Journals, University of Michigan Digital Collections.
- Mitchell, Dennis J. (2014). A New History of Mississippi. Jackson: University Press of Mississippi. ISBN 9781626740198. LCCN 2013044104. OCLC 863127649. Project MUSE book 33980.
- Paxton, William (1885). The Marshall Family. Cincinnati, OH: Robert Clark and Company. OCLC 000000.
- Prichard, Jim (April 2008). "A Killing Gentleman" (PDF). Kentucky Humanities. pp. 27–32. ISSN 1554-6284.
- Winders, Richard Bruce (2016). Panting for Glory: The Mississippi Rifles in the Mexican War. No. 151 Williams-Ford Military History Series. College Station, Texas: Texas A&M University Press. ISBN 978-1-62349-417-9. LCCN 2016004930. OCLC 933438558. Project MUSE book 46192.
