= Narrative of Henry Watson, A Fugitive Slave =

Narrative of Henry Watson, a fugitive slave is a slave narrative by Henry Watson (b. about 1813), an African-American slave and abolitionist. His work is autobiographical, characteristic of the slave narratives of fugitive slaves of the period before emancipation. It is written in a "polemical" style typical of fugitive slave narratives and details the abuses he experienced while enslaved. Unlike most fugitive slave narratives, however, Watson's memoir recounts his self-doubt rather than projecting an image of heroism.

== Summary ==
Watson was enslaved for 26 years in Virginia and Mississippi before escaping to the North. Watson was born in 1813 in Virginia, and at the age of 8 he was taken away from his family and forced to serve a cruel slave master. At first in Virginia, while later he was forced to march to Natchez in order to be sold to Mississippi planters, according to his narrative he was marched in a coffle with others, treated like animals and threatened with corporal punishment for the slightest infraction. When reaching Natchez the slave trader took off the slaves chains and changed their clothes in order for "visitors to examine the flock". Another tactic was to grease the mouths of slaves before the auction so that they would appear well and as if they have just eaten meat. If the slaves displeased him, he would strip them and flog them with a paddle. Additionally, he explained that buyers would look for scars from whipping that would indicate a rebellious slave and therefore lower the price. Furthermore he provides information on the treatment of slaves by their masters, for example the masters examined their slaves at all times to make sure they were appearing happy and if they were "in any mood other than laughing or singing" they were "often whipped or sold". His account also details the harsh conditions under which the slaves worked in the plantation, for example "each individual having a stated number of pounds of cotton to pick" and if this was not met then "the deficit was made up by as many lashes being applied to the back of the poor slave's back". Writing about his owner's wife and the fact that she enjoyed inflicting pain to those under her power, he described her as "taking delight in torturing, - in fact she made it a past time" and that "she inspired everyone about her with terror". While in Mississippi a "gentleman from Boston", an abolitionist probably part of the Underground Railroad, encouraged him to seek his freedom to the North. He suggested boarding a ship and prepared him for any questions that the captain or other white people could possibly have, Watson decided to take the boat to his freedom.

== Publication and reception ==
The book was published by Bela Marsh, a for-profit anti-slavery press, first in 1848, with a second edition in 1849 and a third in 1850.

Describing five slave narratives including that of Henry Watson, The Christian Examiner and Religious Miscellany wrote, "We place these volumes without hesitation among the most remarkable productions of the age,—remarkable as being pictures of slavery by the slave, remarkable as disclosing under a new light the mixed elements of American civilization, and not less remarkable as a vivid exhibition of the force and working of the native love of freedom in the individual mind."

== See also ==
- Kangaroo, Mississippi – Watson discusses gambling in Vicksburg
