= Kangaroo, Vicksburg =

Antebellum gambling district

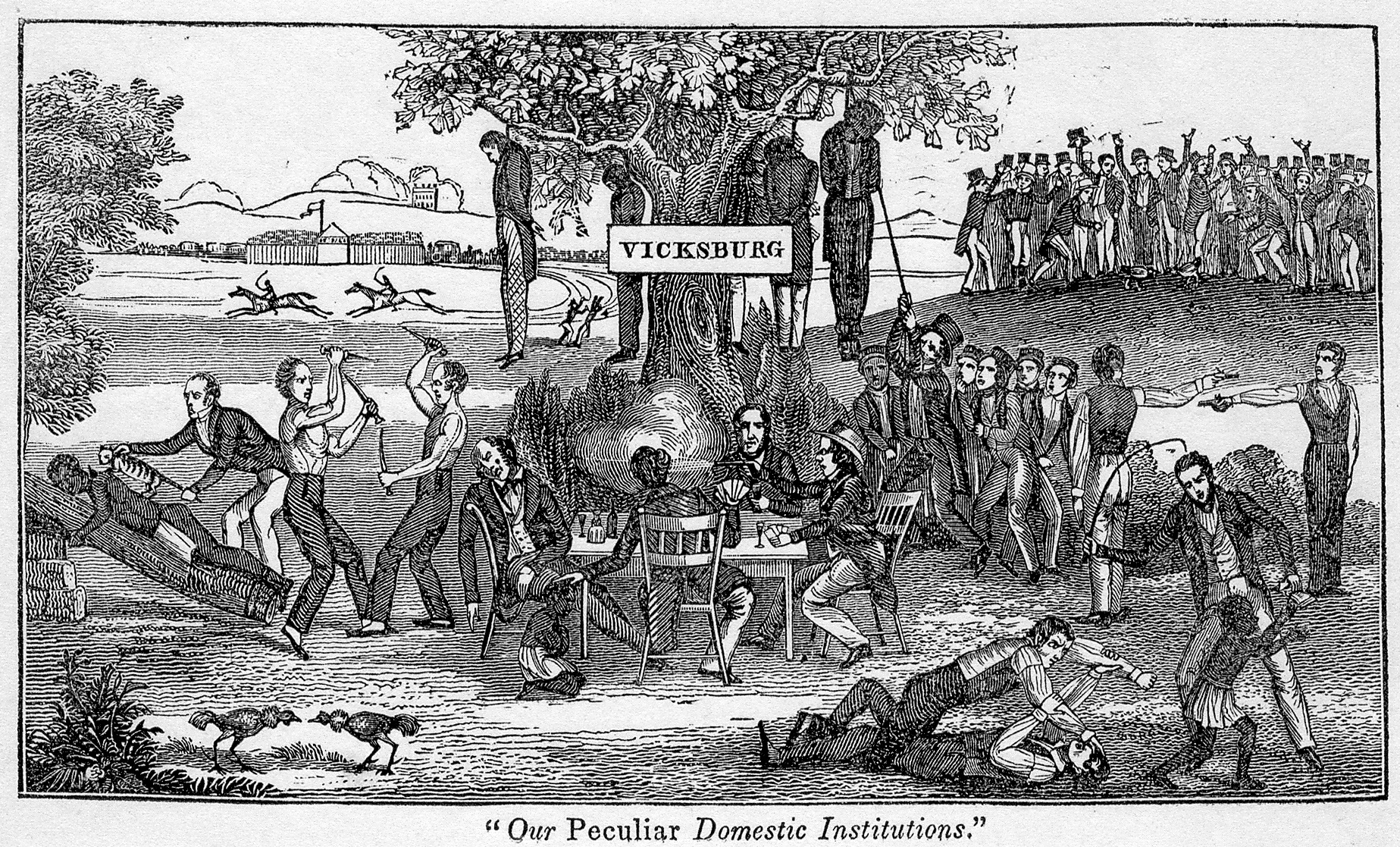
"Hanging of the gamblers" at Vicksburg

Kangaroo, Mississippi was a "red-light district" and/or shantytown located just north of Vicksburg, Mississippi, United States, in a swampy spot where the Glass Bayou entered the Mississippi River. The settlement took its name from its most famous brothel, but no one living knows how that house of ill repute got its name.

Prior to the American Civil War, Kangaroo was notorious for its gambling halls and occasional instances of public disorder resulting from disputes between the players and/or local law enforcement. According to a study of colonial and antebellum Warren County, "The Kangaroo was a constant source of embarrassment and fear for Vicksburg's established residents."

Kangaroo was leveled by a fire in 1834, and "A hundred or so gathered to mourn the death, as one local wit put it, of their 'friend,' the 'celebrated KANGAROO."

Besides the gamblers, other denizens of Kangaroo included "prostitutes, and drunken brawlers."

== 1835: Vicksburg versus the gamblers ==
On July 5, 1835, the gamblers of Kangaroo shot and killed Rev. Dr. Hugh Bodley, a Presbyterian minister. Another account says Bodley died "trying to blast the gamblers out of a coffee shop." Consequent to this, the people of Vicksburg hanged a number of gamblers and affiliates, an instance of vigilante violence emblematic of the age of Jackson. This mass lynching is cited as an example of the tradition of "quasi-respectable violence in America. Vigilantes conceived of their violence as a supplement to, rather than a rebellion against the law." Southern authorities (compared to the North) showed a marked and measurable indifference to the repression of white mobs. The lynched gamblers were tavern keeper Alfred North and his barkeeper Dutch Bill, Samuel Smith, Hullams (or Cullum or Holms or Helm), and McCall. Bodley was the brother of a lawyer named William S. Bodley, who had moved from Kentucky to Vicksburg in 1830, and was law partners with John Templeton. William Bodley "acquired and developed considerable real estate."

== See also ==
- DeSoto Island – Vicksburg's dueling grounds
- Natchez-Under-the-Hill
- Narrative of Henry Watson, A Fugitive Slave – describes gambling in Vicksburg
