= Sowell Woolfolk =

American businessman (d. 1832)

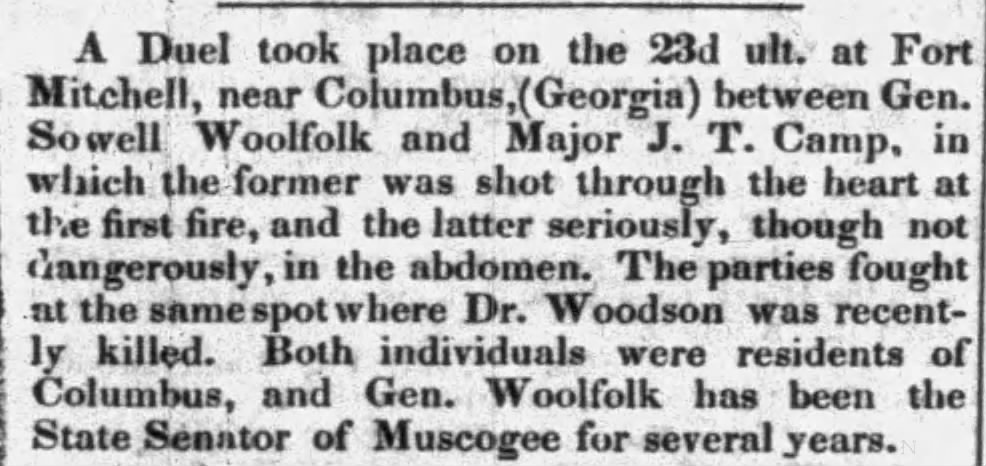
- "Duel" Daily National Intelligencer, District of Columbia, February 7, 1832
- Died: January 23, 1832; Fort Mitchell, Alabama, U.S.
- Cause of death: Firearm
- Occupation: Slave trader
- Relatives: Austin Woolfolk (cousin)

Sowell Woolfolk (died January 23, 1832) was a 19th-century American businessman and politician known for serving as a Georgia state legislator and U.S. state militia officer, working as a slave trader, and dying in a duel at Fort Mitchell, Alabama in 1832.

== Biography ==
The major source on Woolfolk is a family history published 2004. A reviewer in the Journal of Southern History commended the 2004 Woolfolk book as an "exemplar of modern genealogical work" but criticized the author's "hagiographic slant...Moreover, Woolfolk subtly presents the Civil War in the 'Lost Cause' mode...In one of several instances of this, she writes: 'Woolfolk family members...supported the Confederate cause for states' rights' as if states' rights was the cause of the Civil War. And, although passing references are made to the Woolfolk family slaves, their participation in the narrative is minute compared to the contribution they made to the family's fortunes."

Sowell Woolfolk was originally from Augusta, Georgia. He bought land for himself and family members in the vicinity of Columbus, Georgia beginning in 1827. In March 1827 "a gang of white men, negroes, and Indians, made an attack on the premises of Mr. Sowell...burned all the buildings, seven in number, comprising one of the best settlements on the property of the state in the newly acquired territory...the cause of it was that [Woolfolk] had publicly rented property from the State's Agent contrary to their wishes". He served in the Georgia House of Representatives in 1827 and in the Georgia Senate in 1830 and 1831. He was a brigadier general in the Georgia militia from 1828 to 1832, and thus is sometimes named in histories as Gen. Sowell Woolfolk. A letter reprinted into The Liberator abolitionist newspaper in 1831 advised Gen. Sowell to be alert for an insurrection conspiracy between "the negroes" and "the Indians" of Georgia and North Carolina.

In 1832 Woolfolk twice dueled Joseph T. Camp, another Columbus city official (Woolfolk was intendant, Camp a commissioner). The first duel ended with no shots fired; the second duel ended with Woolfolk's death within minutes. According to a history of Columbus published by the University of Georgia Press, "The two ambitious men had aligned with opposing political factions, the Troupites and the Clarkites, parties bound by personal loyalty rather than ideological differences. The Niles Register remarked, 'We do not know what they differ about—but they do violently differ.'" (Note: In August 1833, another Clarkite-Troupite shootout took place. A man named John Milton, who claimed to have been a friend of Sowell Woolfolk, shot Camp dead in the streets of Columbus with a double-barreled shotgun fired from inside a store. Milton claimed self-defense and the politically sympathetic jury accepted the claim. Milton later became Confederate governor of Florida.)

Sowell Woolfolk was a cousin of Austin Woolfolk, "one of Baltimore's major slave dealers" who rose to prominence "assisted by kinsmen and allied traders...Initially, the Woolfolks transported coffles overland to Augusta, Georgia, for resale, along with the occasional shipment to Savannah or Charleston." The Woolfolks "took advantage of the 'Alabama fever' by providing young slaves to farmers moving to the new gulf coast states. In this business they were strategically well situated, for Augusta, their headquarters, straddled the federal road. To the west lay the rich Tennessee River valley, and beyond" the Natchez slave market. Nine years after Woolfolk was killed in the duel, The Mississippi Free Trader newspaper of Natchez listed "Gen. Woolfolk of the Georgia Senate" as one of the honorable gentleman of the slave trade, responding to an assertion that the business was conducted by "desperate, dangerous, and tyrannical men" by stating:

These desperate fellows conduct themselves very peaceably, here, and seem to be great favorites any how. We have seen Col. Bingaman arm in arm, an hundred times, with an old trader, Eli Odom; and we know a certain Isaac Franklin, John L. Harris, Thomas Rowan, Gen. Woolfolk of the Georgia Senate, to say nothing of others, that are recognized here and elsewhere, as gentlemen of the first water. We know a certain Rice Ballard, whose associates, in Virginia, are equal to any man's, and there is also one John Armfield, whose splendid mansion in Alexandria, with its refined hospitalities, is the resort of the most distinguished public men at Washington. A desperate set of ruffians these, with old Andrew Jackson at their head!"

== See also ==
- History of slavery in Georgia
- List of slave traders of the United States
- Slave markets and slave jails in the United States
- Bibliography of the slave trade in the United States
