= List of United States Military Academy non-graduate alumni =

The United States Military Academy (USMA) is an undergraduate college in West Point, New York with the mission of educating and commissioning officers for the United States Army. The list is drawn from non-graduate former cadets and cadet candidates. It is not unusual for the service academies to have high dropout rates. Of the original 103 cadets in the Class of 1826, only 43 graduated. Non-graduates of the academy have entered a variety of fields. Notable non-graduates include Edgar Allan Poe (literature), James Abbott McNeill Whistler (art), Maynard James Keenan (music), Adam Vinatieri (football), and even the military: Jacob Zeilin, Lewis Addison Armistead, and Courtney Hodges.

== Non-graduates ==
As these alumni did not graduate, their class year represents the year they would have graduated if they had completed their education at the Academy.

Name	Class year	Notability	References
William S. Hamilton	1818	Colonel; Illinois State Representative; Wisconsin Territorial Representative; son of U.S. Secretary of the Treasury Alexander Hamilton, grandson of U.S. Senator and Major General Philip Schuyler; nephew of U.S. Representative Philip Jeremiah Schuyler; attended the Academy 1814–1817	
Alexander Barrow	1820	U.S. Senator from Louisiana, lawyer; attended the Academy 1816–1818	
James Fannin	1823	Texas War for Independence; entered the Academy as "James F. Walker" in 1819 but resigned in 1821 from the Academy due to poor grades, absences and tardiness	
Jacob Zeilin	1826	First United States Marine Corps general officer, Commandant of the Marine Corps (1864–1876); part of Commodore Perry's expedition to Japan; appointed to the Academy in 1822, but discharged due to low grades	
John Westcott	1827	Surgeon in the United States Army and later Captain in the Confederate States Army; Florida State Representative; Surveyor General of Florida; brother of U.S. Senator James Westcott; entered the Academy in 1827 and left the same year for medical reasons	
Benjamin Grubb Humphreys	1829	General in Confederate States Army; 26th Governor of Mississippi; classmate of Robert E. Lee and Joseph E. Johnston; Humphreys and 38 other cadets were expelled in 1826 after a "Christmas frolic" turned into the Eggnog riot	
John Archibald Campbell	1830	Associate Justice of the Supreme Court of the United States; left the Academy after three years to care for family's affairs after father's death	
Edgar Allan Poe	1834	Served as a non-commissioned officer in the U.S. Army 1827–1829; author who excelled in language who was expelled for neglecting duties.	
Alexander Hamilton Jr.	1836	Son of James Alexander Hamilton, and the grandson of Alexander Hamilton, one of the Founding Fathers of the United States. From June 1842 to April 1844, he was the Secretary of the United States Legation at Madrid, serving under Washington Irving. Attended the Academy from 1832 to 1835. Served in the Civil War.	
Lewis Addison Armistead	1839	Confederate Brigadier General killed at Gettysburg; expelled for a fight in which he broke a plate over the head of fellow future Confederate general Jubal Early; later commissioned in the Regular Army, which he left as a major to join the Confederacy	
John Cleveland Robinson	1839	Dismissed from the Academy after three years but joined the Army one year later; Major General in the American Civil War; awarded the Medal of Honor for valor in action in 1864 near Spotsylvania Courthouse, Virginia; Lieutenant Governor of New York (1873–1874); served two terms as the president of the Grand Army of the Republic	
George W. Morgan	1845	Left the Academy after two years; served in the Army during the Mexican–American War and the Civil War; U.S. Representative from Ohio	
Charles Henry Tompkins	1851	Resigned after two years for unspecified reasons; Brigadier General; recipient of the Medal of Honor for twice charging through the enemy's lines on July 1, 1861, near Fairfax, Virginia, making him the first Union officer of the Civil War to receive the Medal of Honor	
Wharton J. Green	1854	Confederate officer; U.S. Congressman (1883–1887); resigned before graduation	
James Abbott McNeill Whistler	1855	Artist; discharged for academic and disciplinary problems after three years	
Robert Cobb Kennedy	1859	Confederate operative; hanged in 1865 for his part in the plot to burn New York City; last Confederate soldier executed by the U.S. government during the Civil War; discharged for poor academic performance and drinking	
George F. Elliott	1872	Tenth Commandant of the Marine Corps (1903–1910); successfully resisted attempts to merge the Corps into the Army; discharged due to low grades	
Andrew Jackson Houston	1875	U.S. Senator (1941); son of Sam Houston; resigned	
Johnson Chesnut Whittaker	1881	Born into slavery; expelled after board of inquiry and court-martial {falsely} convicted him of staging an assault on his own person; verdict overturned by president Chester Arthur—but Whittaker still expelled on grounds he failed a exam. Assault at West Point: The Court-Martial of Johnson Whittaker by John Marszalek popularized the case and led to his posthumous commission in 1995	
Albert W. Gilchrist	1882	Governor of Florida (1909–1913); found deficient in experimental philosophy after three years at the Academy	
Lloyd Fredendall	1905 & 1906	Lieutenant General in World War II; expelled for poor grades in mathematics and poor general deportment; readmitted following year and expelled again; later received a direct commission in 1907; relieved of command after the Battle of the Kasserine Pass and reassigned to training commands	
Courtney Hodges	1909	General in World War II; dropped out after the first year because "found deficient" in mathematics, as was his second-year plebe classmate George S. Patton who graduated in 1909; Hodges then enlisted as a private and became the second person to rise from private to general; Instructor at the Academy after World War I	
Chief Buffalo Child Long Lance	1916	American journalist, writer and actor from Winston-Salem, North Carolina who became internationally prominent as a spokesman for Indian causes. attended in 1916 on a Presidential appointment, left to join Canadian Forces en route to World War I	
James Millikin Bevans	1921	Major General; recipient of the Distinguished Service Medal; discharged in 1918	
Walter French	1923	Professional baseball player; later coached the baseball team at West Point. Was commissioned during World War II and retired from the Air Force as a lieutenant colonel.	
Ralph Yarborough	1923	U.S. Senator from Texas (1957–1971); leader of the Democratic Party of Texas; resigned after two years to become a teacher; enlisted in Texas National Guard; lieutenant colonel in World War II	
Chris Keener Cagle	1930	Professional football player; played football at the Academy during the 1926–1929 seasons; resigned in May 1930 after it was discovered he had married in August 1928	
Timothy Leary	1943	Counterculture icon, LSD proponent; resigned	
Michael J. Daly	1945	Captain; resigned after one year to enlist so he could fight in World War II; received a battlefield commission; awarded the Medal of Honor for assaulting several enemy positions	
Roger Donlon	1959	Resigned for personal reasons; Captain, later Colonel; recipient of the Medal of Honor for repulsing a much larger attack	
James A. Gardner	1962	Did not graduate; first lieutenant; recipient of the Medal of Honor for actions leading his platoon in the relief of a company that was engaged with a larger enemy force	
Jerry McNerney	1973	Resigned in protest of the Vietnam War. Served in the United States House of Representatives from 2007-2023. Later elected to the California State Senate.	
Richard Hatch	1986	Winner of the first Survivor; resigned	
Byron (Low Tax) Looper	1987	Politician convicted of murdering his Tennessee State Senate opponent Tommy Burks in 1998; attended the Academy from 1982 to 1985; discharged due to a serious knee injury	
Maynard James Keenan	1988	Singer in the bands Tool and A Perfect Circle; would have been part of the Class of 1988 but he never started at the Academy as he was accepted to West Point in 1984 while he was a cadet candidate at United States Military Academy Preparatory School but decided to complete his term of active duty enlistment	
Adam Vinatieri	1995	National Football League placekicker for the New England Patriots and Indianapolis Colts; left the Academy after two weeks	
Dan Hinote	1999	Professional National Hockey League (NHL) ice hockey player; resigned in 1996 when he was drafted by the Colorado Avalanche; first NHL player ever drafted from West Point	
Maura Murray	2004	she was a star athlete on the school's track team. She was accepted into the United States Military Academy in West Point, New York, where she studied chemical engineering for three semesters. Believing that West Point was not a good fit for her, she transferred to the University of Massachusetts Amherst after her first year to study nursing. She disappeared on the evening of February 9, 2004, after a car crash on Route 112 near Woodsville, New Hampshire, a village in the town of Haverhill. A nursing student completing her junior year at the University the time of her disappearance	
Shane Gillis	2006	Accepted as football player, lasting only weeks, and later becoming a comedian.	
Peter Meijer	2010	Congressman from Michigan's 3rd congressional district, 2021-2023. Transferred to Columbia University in 2008, graduated in 2012. Served in the US Army from 2008-2016, retiring with the rank of Sergeant.	
Stephen Scherer	2011	10m air rifle competitor in the 2008 Olympics; transferred to Texas Christian University where he later committed suicide	
Charlotte Clymer	2013	LGBTQ rights activist. Left the academy after three years.	

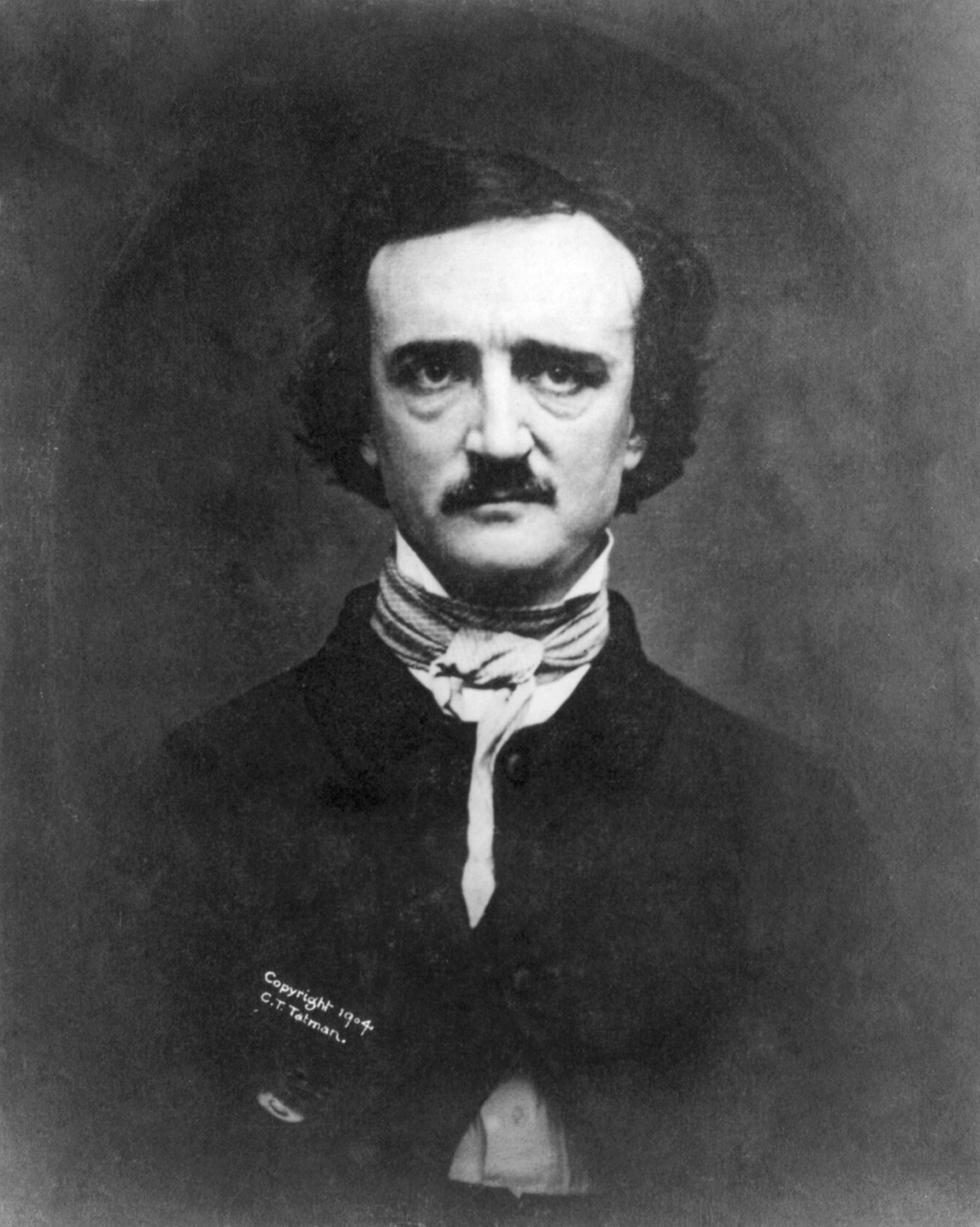
Edgar Allan Poe

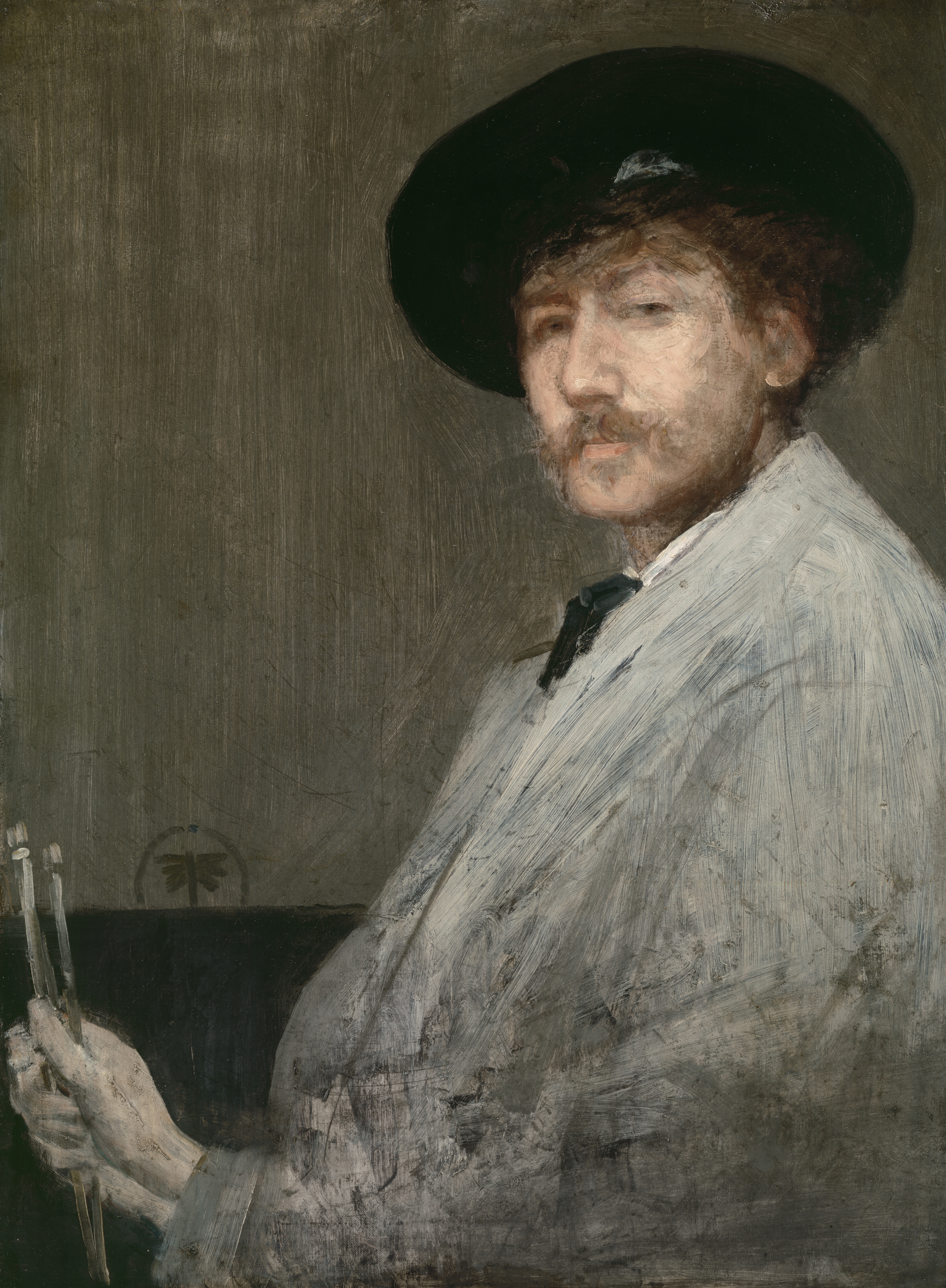
James Whistler

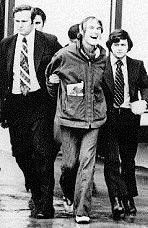
Timothy Leary

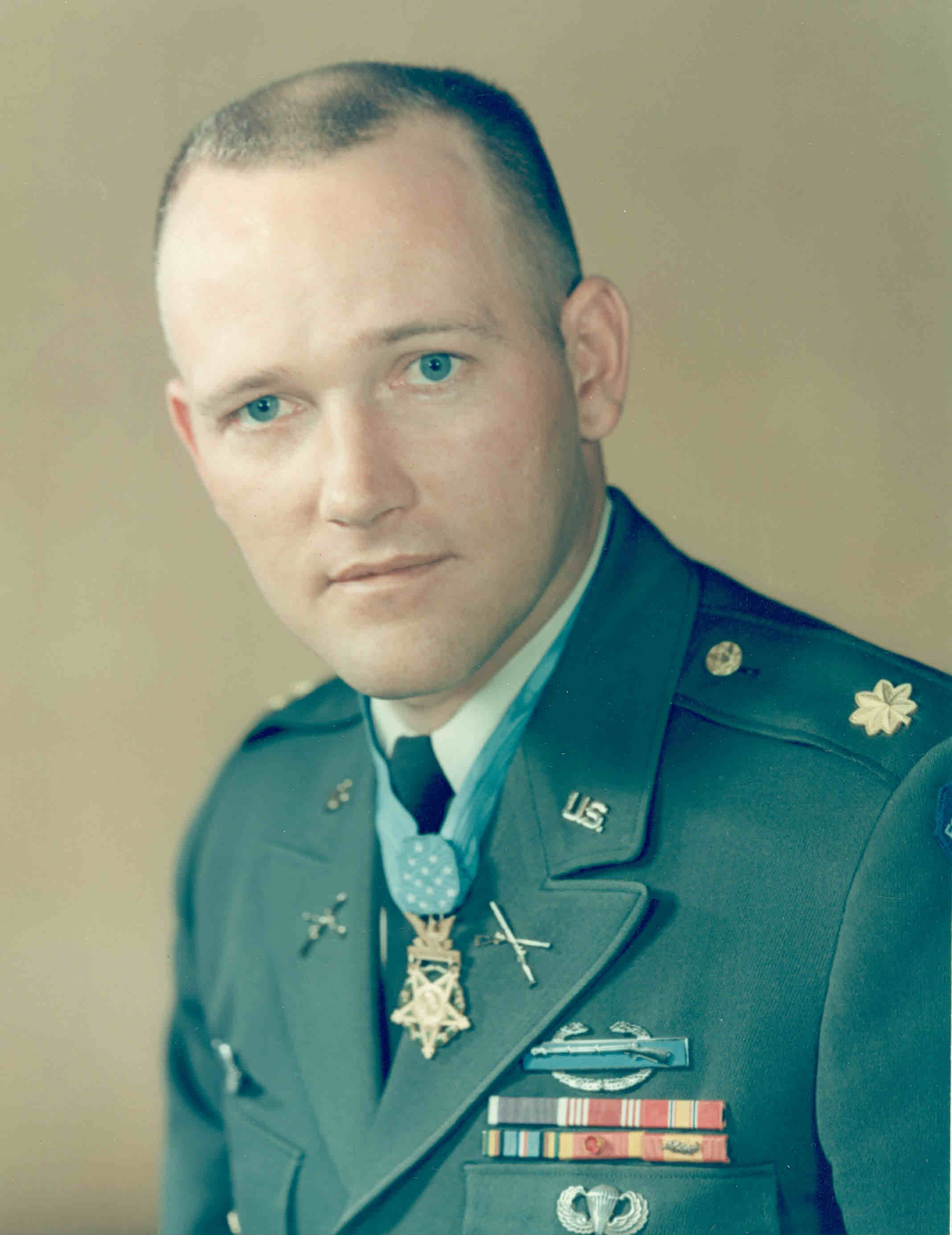
Roger Donlon

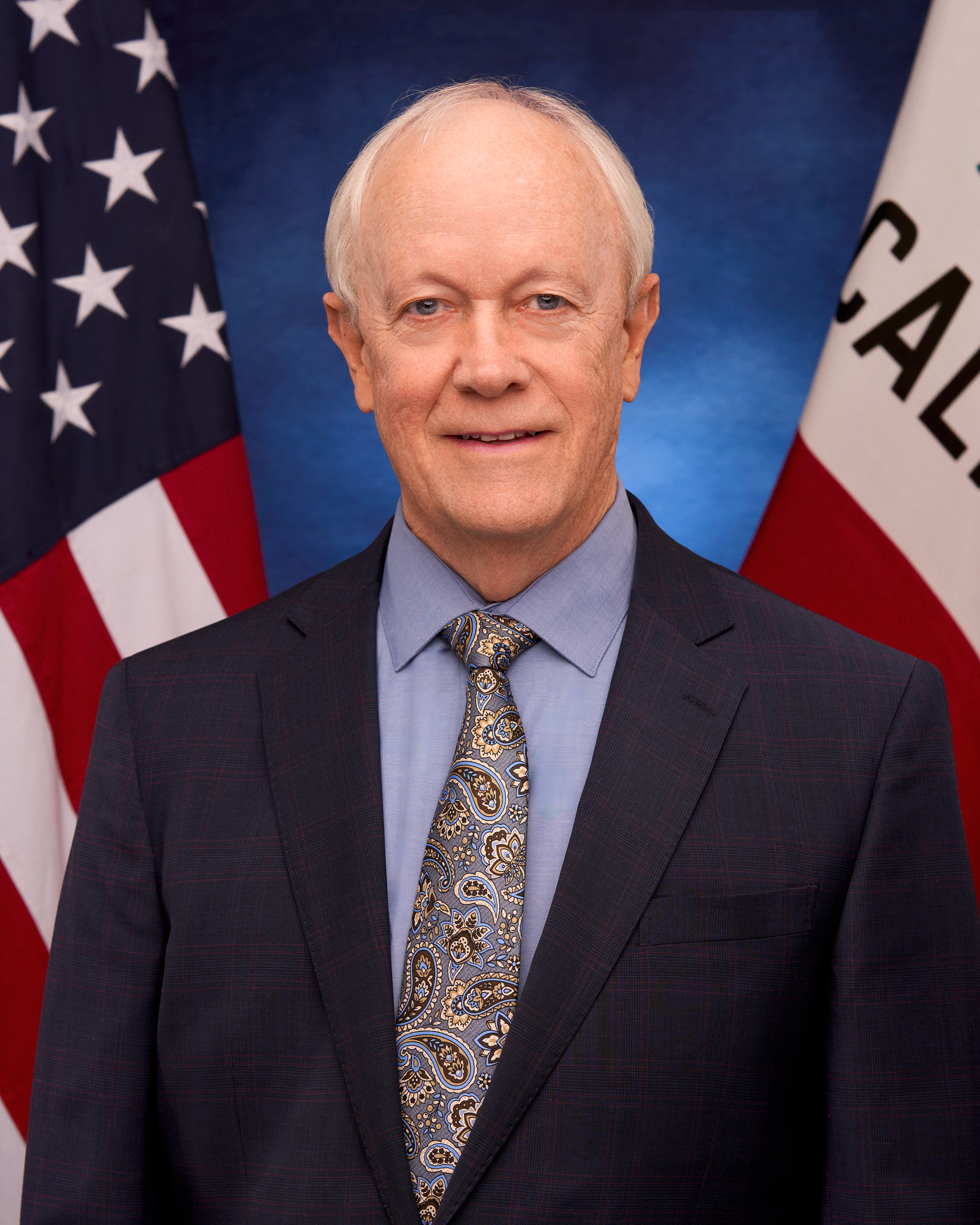
Jerry McNerney

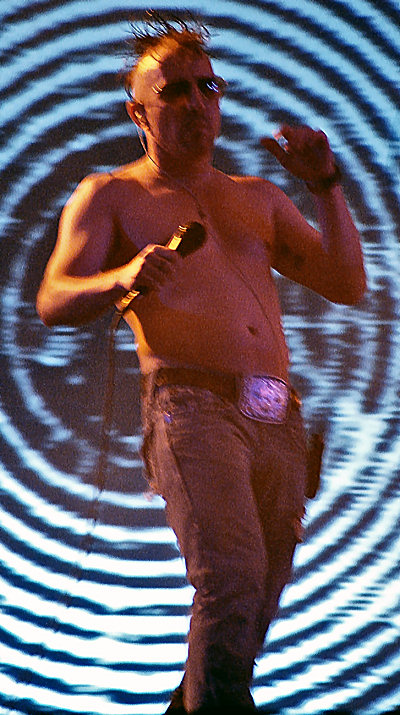
Maynard James Keenan

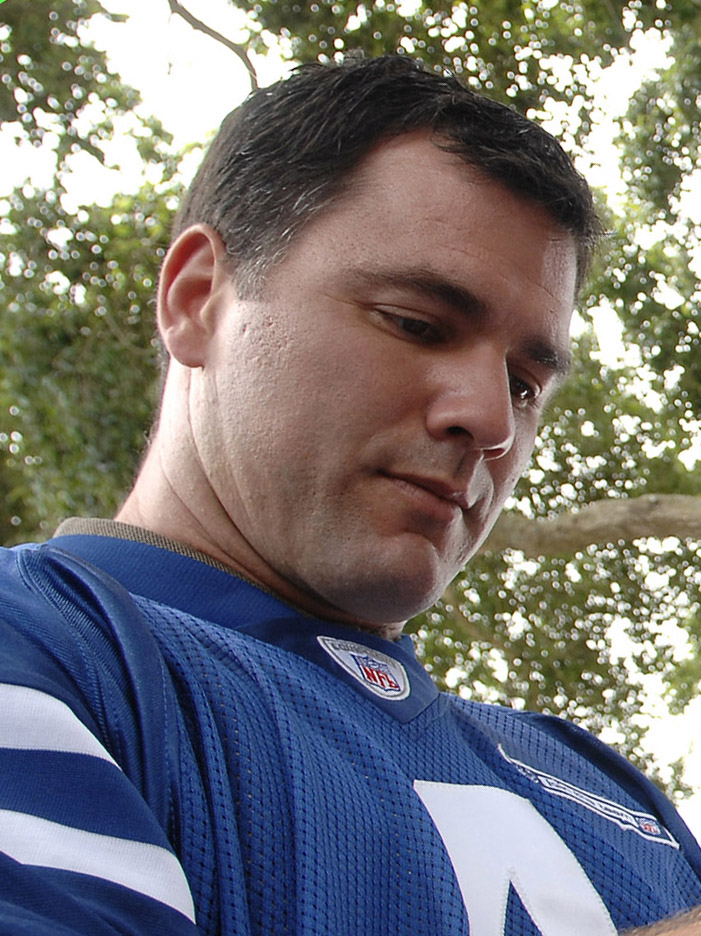
Adam Vinatieri

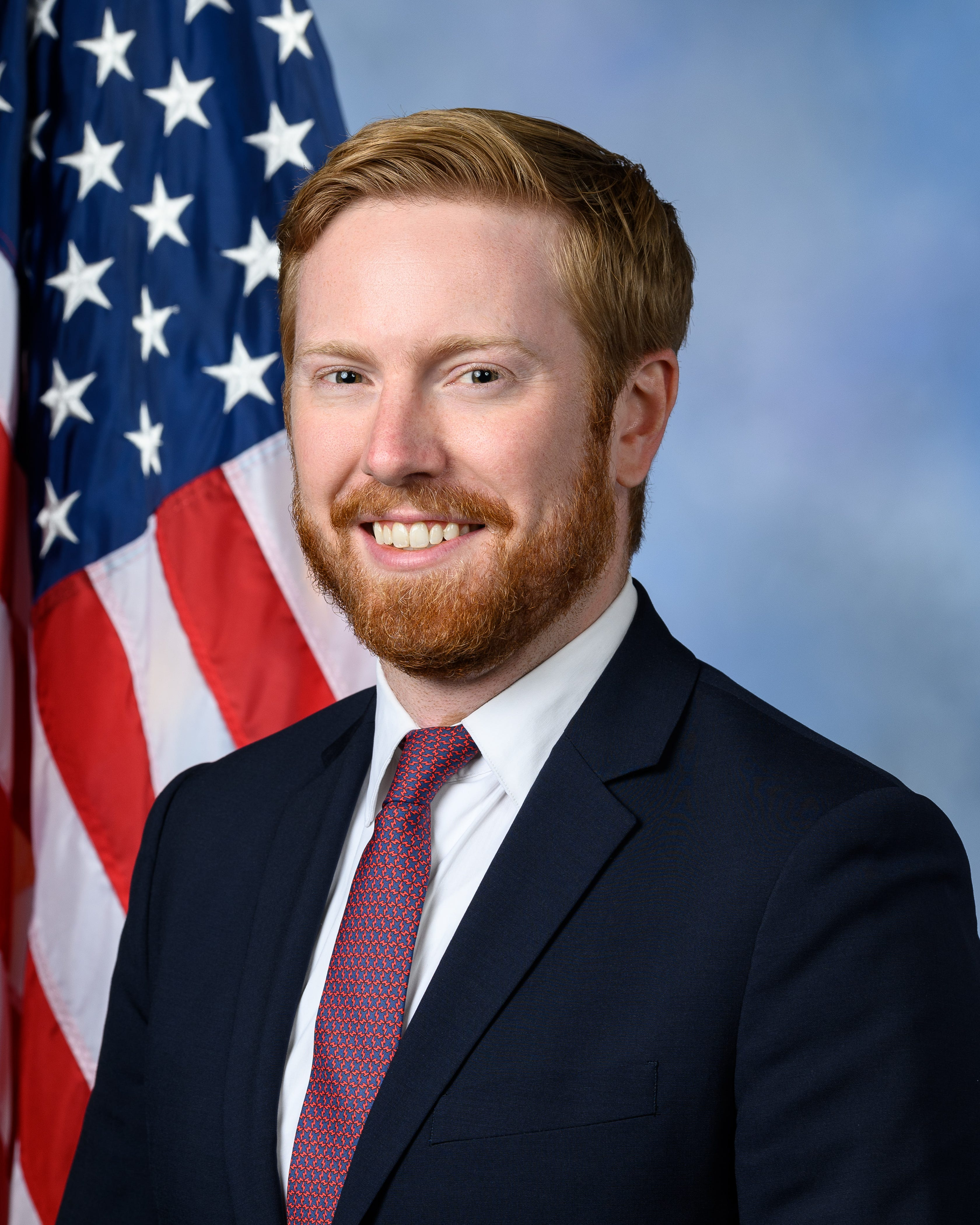
Peter Meijer

== See also ==
- List of United States Military Academy alumni
- Knights Out
