= Isaac Caldwell =

American judge (1795–1836)

Isaac Caldwell (1795 – January 12, 1836) was a justice of the Supreme Court of Mississippi from 1825 to 1826.

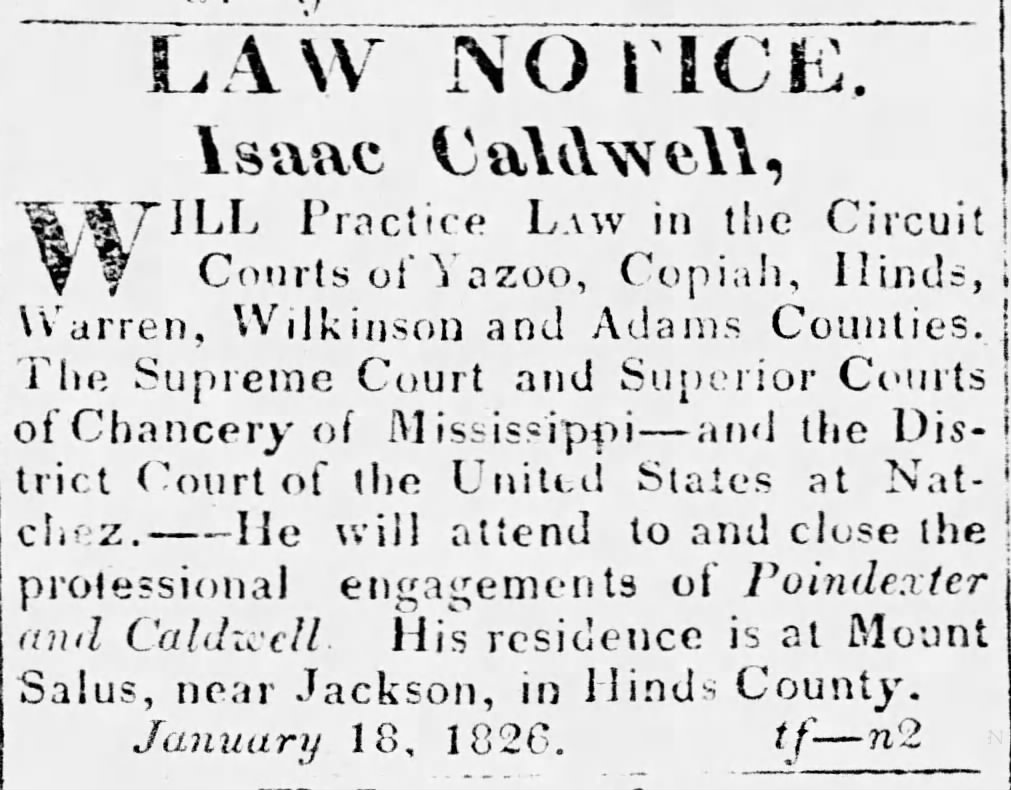
"Law Notice: Isaac Caldwell" State Journal, December 6, 1826

Born in Clinton, Mississippi, Caldwell became well-known as an attorney. In 1829, Caldwell fought a duel with state legislator John R. Peyton over the latter's vote preventing Caldwell's hometown from being named capital of Mississippi; neither participant was injured. In 1831–1832 he was aligned with the Nullification movement of John C. Calhoun, along with George Poindexter, John A. Quitman, George Winchester, Cotesworth Pinckney Smith, and William L. Sharkey.

Caldwell was the law partner of Senator George Poindexter, and following Poindexter's defeat in his 1836 bid for reelection, Caldwell ended up engaging in a duel with one of Poindexter's political opponents, Colonel Samuel Gwin. The parties fought with pistols, and "[b]oth parties fell. Caldwell expired in two hours. Gwin was shot through the lungs and survived about a year".

His widow died in 1842.

Henry S. Foote alleged that his wife, who died a couple years later, initially believed a suicide, was murdered by her second husband. Her second husband, a Dr. Kearney, allegedly fled to Mexico to escape prosecution. In 1843 Thomas Kearney was listed as an "administrator de bon nonis" for the estate of Isaac Caldwell.

The Caldwells were buried in a small family cemetery near what is today Interstate 20.

== See also ==
- List of justices of the Supreme Court of Mississippi
- List of duels in the United States

Political offices
Preceded by Powhatan Ellis	Justice of the Supreme Court of Mississippi; 1825–1826	Succeeded by John Black
