= Rowan & Harris =

American slave-trading company

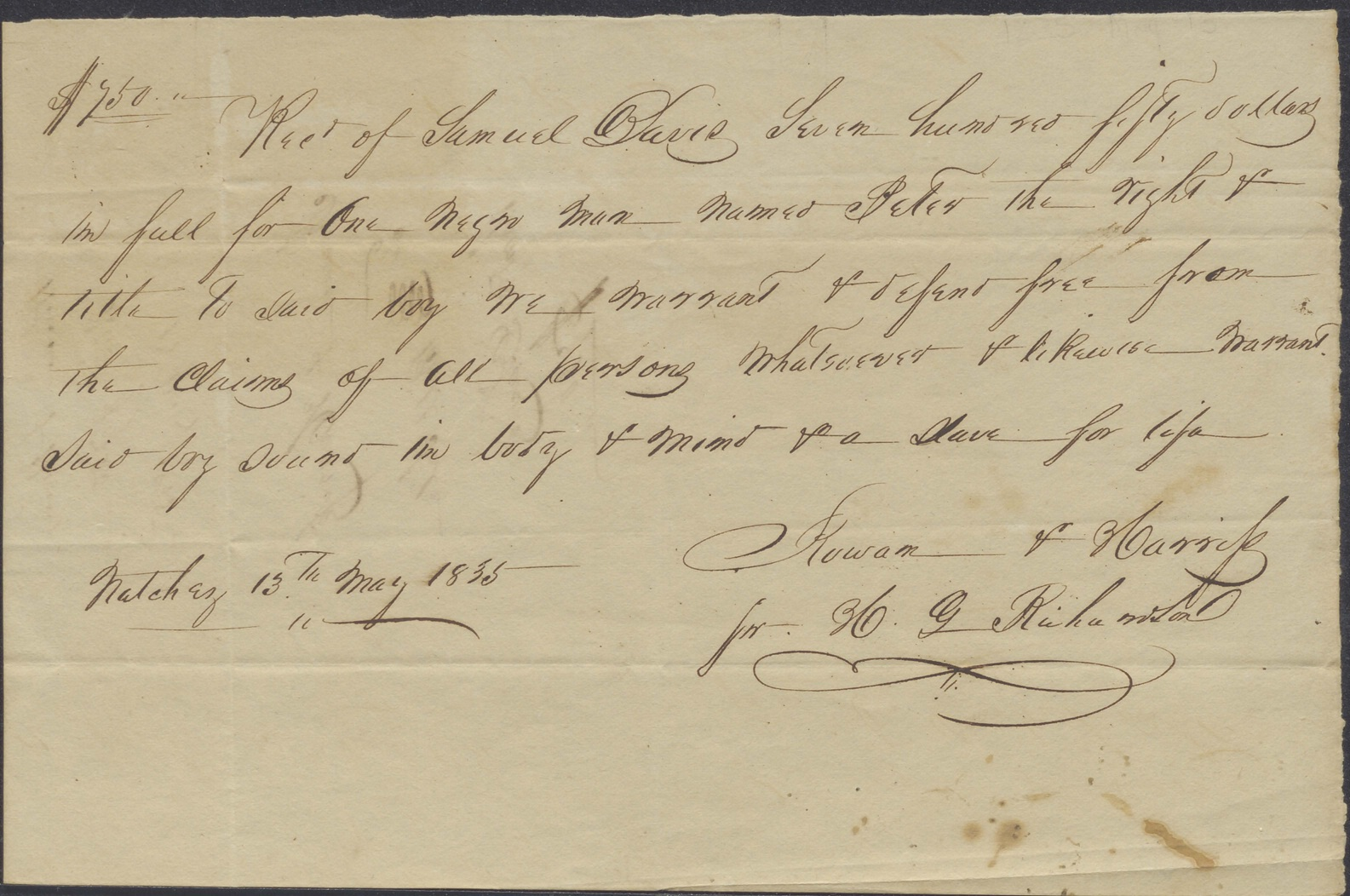
Bill of sale for Peter sold by H. G. Richardson on behalf of Rowan & Harris for $750 to Samuel Davis, May 1835 (Mississippi State University Lantern Project)

Rowan & Harris, sometimes Harris Rowan & Co., was a slave trading company of the United States, known for selling at the Forks of the Road slave market in Natchez, Mississippi in the 1830s. The principals were John L. Harris and Thomas Rowan.

In 1834, Harris was advertising "180 negroes for sale" in Natchez. Rowan died sometime before 1851 when their lawsuit against Hiram G. Runnels went before the U.S. Supreme Court. The nature of the case was "In Rowan v. Runnels, the plaintiffs, John A. Rowan [sic] and John L. Harris, brought action to recover on a promissory note given them by the defendant, Hiram G. Runnels. The note was dated March 27, 1839, and was payable March 1, 1840. The only consideration in back of the note was certain slaves brought into Mississippi in 1836 and sold by the plaintiffs as merchandise. This was the evidence presented in the lower court, and the jury was instructed to declare the note void if the slaves had been introduced into the State and sold after May 1, 1833. When the verdict and judgment were rendered against them, the plaintiffs appealed to the lower federal court where the contract was held illegal under the Mississippi Constitution of 1832, and appeal was taken to the Supreme Court..." The court overruled the Mississippi Supreme Court and declared Mississippi's 1832 rule prohibiting slave sales irrelevant to the contract, with Roger Taney writing for majority. Peter V. Daniel dissented, writing "that a state court interpretation of its own constitution should be binding on all. To ignore this rule as the Court was doing was, in his opinion, to reflect upon the competency of state courts and to impair the very nature of the federal system".

In 1841, Rice C. Ballard was the trustee listing for sale the 2,300-acre Bruinsburg plantation in Claiborne County and over 100 slaves (including 23 children under age eight) "to pay three promissory notes owed Rowan & Harris.

== See also ==
- List of slave traders of the United States
