= Dueling in the Southern United States =

Extinct practice in the American South

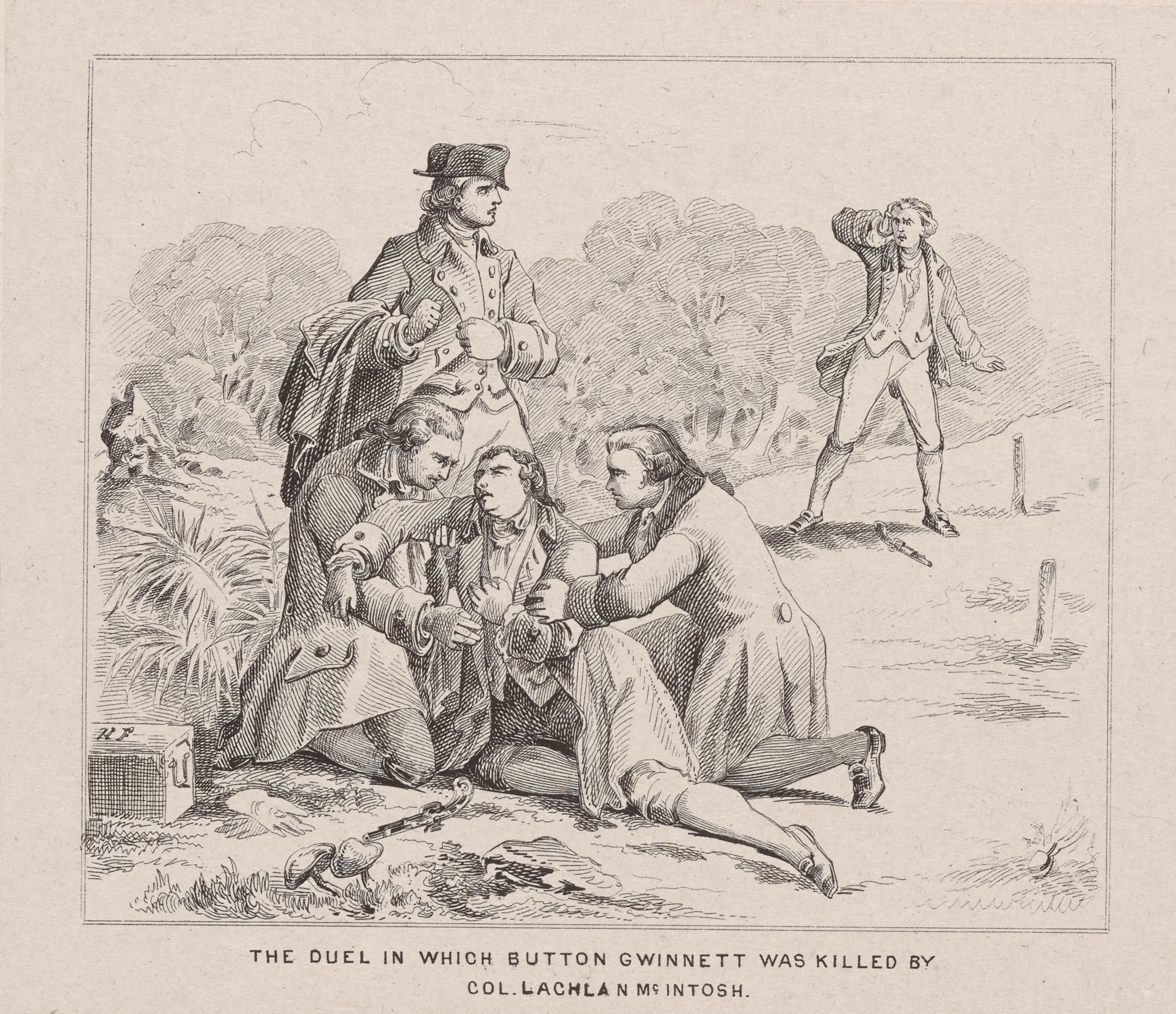
1865 Artist's depiction of the aftermath of the Gwinnett–McIntosh duel fought in Savannah, Georgia in 1777.

Dueling was a common practice in the Southern United States from the 17th century until the end of the American Civil War in 1865. Although the duel largely disappeared in the early nineteenth century in the North, it remained a common practice in the South (as well as the West) until the battlefield experience of the American Civil War changed public opinion and resulted in a decline for dueling. The markets and governance of the South were not as institutionalized during the 19th century as the North. Thus, duels presented what seemed like a faster way of settling disputes outside of the courts. Although many duels were fought to settle disputes over tangible items such as land, unpaid debts, money, or women, more were over intangible ones.

== Background ==
The act of dueling was often condemned by public figures throughout early United States history and seen as unnecessarily violent and instigated by trivial matters. For example, to pinch someone's nose was an insult grave enough to challenge to a duel for it symbolized the unmasking of a liar. Contrary to the perception that the act of dueling occurred at the "drop of a hat", there were real economic forces that drove one to challenge another or accept a duel. However, the concept of "defending one's honor" was not quite as abstract and idealistic as often imagined – losing "honor" often had pecuniary disadvantages that made defending one's honor a somewhat rational decision, even at risk of being physically harmed or even killed. Dueling to protect one's credit or honor was partly a response to the underdeveloped credit markets of this region and time period.

=== Personal credit in the South ===
In the Southern US, whose economy was mostly agricultural (including plantations) and production cycles were longer-term than those of their manufacturing-oriented Northern counterparts, planters were often highly leveraged and dependent on personal credit to carry them through to the harvesting and sale of their crops. The assets of plantation owners were largely illiquid, their estates holding value in the form of real estate and slaves. Thus, preserving personal credit was important to the livelihoods of planters.

Given that Southern credit markets were rather opaque until the early 20th century—lenders could not readily view an applicant's financial statement—having a reputation as "honorable" was almost essential to obtaining approval for loans. In addition, transaction costs were high during this period; therefore, perceived personal integrity or good character was viewed as likely to honor one's contracts and debts. Thus, the word honor was nearly culturally synonymous with creditworthiness. The long-term economic penalties for having one's reputation ruined included limited access to capital and diminished political influence.

Lending institutions did not punish debtors for participating in duels. A planter might risk a devaluation of his assets as a result of turning down a duel – with the loss of his honor – which would harm the lender as well. In the case that a debtor accepted a duel challenge and lost, the lender could expect an honorable man to honor his debts posthumously by paying back the owed amount with interest as his estate was liquidated.

== Rise in state capacity ==
According to a 2020 study, dueling behavior in the US declined as state capacity (measured by the density of post offices) increased.

== Rise of modern financial institutions ==
Dueling in the US virtually disappeared by the start of the 20th century with the rise of modern banking institutions and commercialized lending in the South, which were characterized by greater transparency and lower transaction costs. The larger, commercialized financial institutions that slowly took market share in the South took a faster, more impersonal approach to screening that placed less importance on personal character.

== Culture of honor ==
The Southern culture of honor is often tied to the relative persistence of dueling in the South, a cultural phenomenon in which special caution is taken to not offend others and misconduct is not taken lightly (dealt with swift and firm retribution). A high premium is placed on toughness in this culture of honor, because one is expected to defend one's resources and deter predators.

In a relatively recent study on Southern attitudes toward violence, it was shown that employers in the South were more likely to be sympathetic than employers in the North toward a fictional applicant who explained in a letter with his job application that he had been charged with manslaughter for responding to an insult, accepting a challenge to a fight, and accidentally killing his challenger.

Now and then there are Duels, for very little cause,
The natives soon forget 'em—they care not much for laws.

— James Creecy, "A Duel in New Orleans, in 1829" (1860)

== See also ==
- List of duels in the United States
- List of Confederate duels
