= Gilchrist (surname) =

Gilchrist is a surname of Gaelic language origins. In many cases it is derived from a Scottish Gaelic name, Gille Chrìost, Gille Chriosd, meaning "servant of Christ" (i.e. gilla "servant", chriosd "Christ"). Surnames of similar origins include MacGilchrist and McGilchrist, which are usually derived from Mac Giolla Chriosd or, literally, "son of the servant of Christ". Early, semi-anglicised versions of the surname recorded include Geilchreist, Gilchryst, Gillchreist, Gillcryst, Mcillchreist and Mylchrest.

In Orkneyinga saga, chapter 63, Haraldr Gilli Magnússon, king of Norway from 1130 to 1136, is first introduced under the name of Gilli-kristr, obviously a Norse version of Gilchrist.

In many, perhaps most, cases, people with these surnames are descendants of the Scottish Clan Gilchrist, a sept of Clan MacLachlan.

== People ==
- Adam Gilchrist (born 1971), Australian cricketer
- Agnes Addison Gilchrist (1907–1975), American architectural historian
- Albert W. Gilchrist (1858–1926), American politician from Florida
- Alexander Gilchrist (1828–1861), British biographer
- Alfie Gilchrist (born 2003), British footballer
- Alfred J. Gilchrist (1872–1931), American politician from New York
- Andrew Gilchrist (1910–1993), British diplomat
- Anne Gilchrist (disambiguation), several people
  - Anne Gilchrist (writer) (1828–1885), English writer
  - Anne Gilchrist (collector) (1863–1954), British folk-song collector
- Annie Somers Gilchrist (1841–1912), American writer
- Archibald M. Gilchrist (1805–1854), American lawyer and state legislator
- Augustus Gilchrist (born 1989), American basketball player
- Brent Gilchrist (born 1967), Canadian ice hockey player
- Bruce Gilchrist (1930–2015), computer scientist
- Charles W. Gilchrist, American politician from Maryland
- Cameron Gilchrist, Scottish footballer
- Charlotte Gilchrist (b. c. 1834), Maryland slave escaped to Canada
- Connie Gilchrist (1901–1985), American actress
- Connie Gilchrist, Countess of Orkney (1865–1946), child actor and artist's model
- Cookie Gilchrist (1935–2011), American football player
- Craig Gilchrist (born 1970), South African basketball player and coach
- Donald Gilchrist (1922–2017), Canadian figure skater
- Ellen Gilchrist (born 1935), American novelist
- Emma Gilchrist, Canadian journalist
- Garlin Gilchrist (born 1982), American politician from Michigan
- Gordon Gilchrist (born 1985), Scottish artist
- Gordon Gilchrist (born 1928), Canadian politician
- Grant Gilchrist (born 1990), Scottish rugby union player
- Guy Gilchrist, American cartoonist
- Harald Gilchrist, king of Norway
- James Gilchrist (tenor), tenor
- Jeremy Gilchrist (born 1986), US and Canadian football player
- Jim Gilchrist (born 1949), founder of the Minutemen Project
- John Gilchrist (disambiguation), several people
  - John Gilchrist (actor) (born 1968), child actor
  - John Gilchrist (basketball) (born 1985), American basketball player
  - John Gilchrist (cricketer) (born 1932), English cricketer
  - John Gilchrist (footballer, born 1900) (1900–1950), Scottish footballer
  - John Gilchrist (footballer, born 1939) (1939–1991), Scottish footballer
  - John Gilchrist (judge) (1809–1858), American jurist
  - John Gilchrist (linguist) (1759–1841), Scottish surgeon and Indologist
  - John Gilchrist (New Zealand politician) (1872–1947), political activist
  - John Gilchrist (Province of Canada politician) (1792–1859), Canadian politician
  - John Gilchrist (zoologist) (1866–1926), Scottish South African ichthyologist
- Joyce Gilchrist (1948–2015), American forensic chemist
- Keir Gilchrist, British-Canadian actor
- Lara Gilchrist, Canadian actress
- Len Gilchrist (1881–1958), English footballer
- Maeve Gilchrist, Scottish harpist and composer
- Malcolm Gilchrist (disambiguation)
- Marcus Gilchrist, American football player
- Maude Gilchrist (1861–1952), American botanist, college dean
- Michael Gilchrist (born 1960), New Zealand athlete
- Michael Kidd-Gilchrist (born 1993), American basketball player
- Nathan Gilchrist, English cricketer
- Percy Gilchrist (1851–1935), British chemist and metallurgist
- Robert Murray Gilchrist (1867–1917), horror writer
- Rosetta Luce Gilchrist (1850–1921), American physician, writer
- Roy Gilchrist (1934–2001), West Indies cricketer
- Stephen Gilchrist, English drummer
- Stephen Gilchrist Glover (born 1974), American television personality Steve-O
- Steve Gilchrist (born 1954), Canadian politician
- William Gilchrist (disambiguation), several people
  - William W. Gilchrist (1846–1916), American composer, musician
  - William W. Gilchrist Jr. (1879–1926) American painter
  - William Sidney Gilchrist (1901–1970), Canadian medical missionary to Angola

=== Given name ===
- Caroline Gilchrist Rhea, American actress, stand-up comedian
- Sidney Gilchrist Thomas, British inventor

== See also ==
- Michael Kidd-Gilchrist (born 1993), American basketball player
- Gilchrest (surname)
- Gilla Críst, cognate personal name
