= Harlan Hogan =

American actor

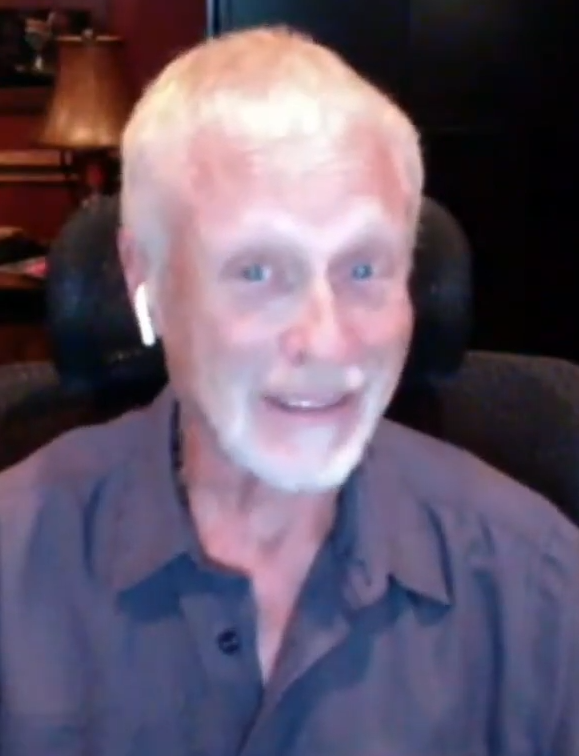
Hogan in 2023

Harlan Hogan is a voice actor and author. He has provided the voice-overs for countless commercials, documentaries and films. Many famous advertising catch phrases such as: "Strong enough for a man...", "You never get a second chance to make a first impression...", "When you care enough to send the very best..." and "Quaker Life, It's the cereal even Mikey likes...", ranked 10th in TV Guides list of best commercials, have been performed by Harlan. He has also written several books on the subject of voice acting.

== Life and career ==
=== Early career ===
Hogan worked his way through Illinois Wesleyan University as a disc jockey on local radio station, WIOK, graduating with a BFA in theater. A variety of jobs followed including program director of WHUT radio, speech coaching for J. Walter Thompson, advertising copywriting at Advanced Systems, Inc. and even a job in computer sales at the Honeywell Corporation.

=== Voice-over ===
Hogan began acting full-time finding a niche doing voice-overs for radio and television ads. Soon Hogan was known in the industry for doing high-profile ads for Raid, Life cereal, Head & Shoulders, and McDonald's "You Deserve a Break Today" campaign. With a career that expands over 30 years Hogan has been acclaimed as a "Voiceover superstar" and "one of the most sought after voice-over actors in the US"

=== Writing ===
Harlan Hogan has authored two books and a DVD on the subject of voice acting. Additionally he has written the scripts for numerous educational and corporate productions including the five-part educational series "The Almost Painless Guide to United States Civics" which won silver and bronze medals at the New York Festivals competition in 1999 and 2000. His books and distinguished career have made him in demand for interviews and commentary on the voice over industry on TV, magazines and newspapers including the New York Times.

=== Theatrical and Film Acting ===
Although not his mainstay Hogan has appeared in a number of theatrical and film productions including recent performances as Edvard Lunt in the Chicago production of Beth Henley’s "Impossible Marriage" and Ivan in the 2007 feature-length film, "Dimension" which came in first in the Experimental category at the 2007 Indie Gathering film festival.

== References and footnotes ==
=== Bibliography ===
- Hogan, Harlan (November 2002) "VO: Tales & Techniques of a Voice-Over Actor". Alworth Press ISBN 1-58115-249-3
- Fisher, Jeffrey P., Hogan, Harlan (February 2005). "A Voice-Actor's Guide to Home Recording". ArtistPro Publishing ISBN 1-931140-43-X
- Douglas Spotted Eagle, Frances, Mannie (Directors) Fisher, Jeffrey P., Hogan, Harlan (Writers) (2005) "Voice Over Success - What You Must Know to Compete in Today's Vo Market" VASST Training DVD-Video
