= John Gilchrist =

John Gilchrist may refer to:

- John Gilchrist (linguist) (1759–1841), Scottish surgeon and Indologist
- John Gilchrist (Province of Canada politician) (1792–1859), politician in Province of Canada
- John Gilchrist (judge) (1809–1858), American judge
- John Gilchrist (zoologist) (1866–1926), Scottish South African ichthyologist
- John Gilchrist (New Zealand politician) (1872–1947), political activist in New Zealand
- John Gilchrist (footballer, born 1900) (1900–1950), Scottish footballer
- John Gilchrist (cricketer) (born 1932), English cricketer
- John Gilchrist (footballer, born 1939) (1939–1991), Scottish footballer
- John Gilchrist (actor) (born 1968), former child actor
- John Gilchrist (basketball) (born 1985), American basketball player
