= William Gilchrist =

William Gilchrist may refer to:

- William W. Gilchrist (1846–1916), American composer, musician
- William W. Gilchrist Jr. (1879–1926) American painter
- William Sidney Gilchrist (1901–1970), Canadian medical missionary to Angola

== See also ==
- Gilchrist (surname)
