= Anne Gilchrist =

Anne Gilchrist may refer to:

- Anne Gilchrist (writer) (1828–1885), English writer
- Anne Gilchrist (collector) (1863–1954), British folk-song collector

== See also ==
- Annie Somers Gilchrist (1841–1912), American writer
