= Gilchrest (surname) =

Gilchrest is a surname. Notable people with the surname include:

- Wayne Gilchrest (born 1946), American politician
- Jillian Gilchrest (born 1982), American politician

== See also ==
- Gilchrist (surname)
- Gilchrest, New Hampshire
