= James Smetham =

British artist (1821–1889)

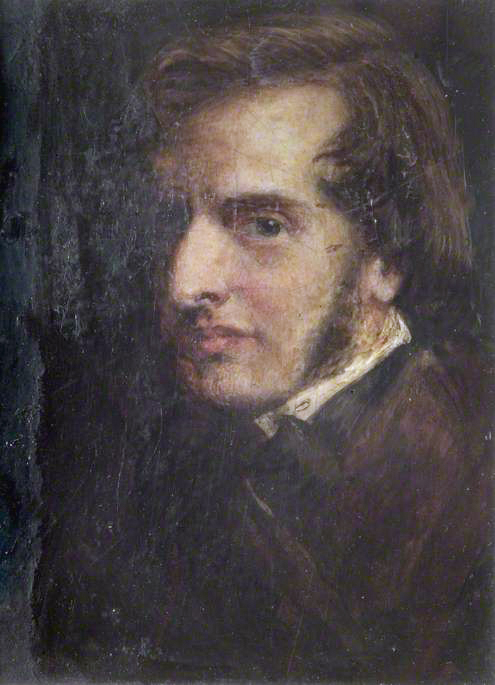
Self portrait, 1855, oil on board, Westminster College, Oxford

James Smetham (9 September 1821 – 5 February 1889) was an English Pre-Raphaelite Brotherhood painter and engraver, a follower of Dante Gabriel Rossetti.

== Biography ==
Smetham was born in Pateley Bridge, Yorkshire, and attended school in Leeds; he was originally apprenticed to the Lincoln architect Edward James Willson before deciding on an artistic career. He studied at the Royal Academy, beginning in 1843. His modest early success as a portrait painter was stifled by the development of photography (a problem shared by other artists of the time). In 1851 Smetham took a teaching position at the Wesleyan Normal College in Westminster, and was the first Drawing Master for what would later become Westminster College, Oxford (today part of Oxford Brookes University). In 1854, he married Sarah Goble, a fellow teacher at the College. They would eventually have six children.

Smetham worked in a range of genres, including religious and literary themes as well as portraiture; but he is perhaps best known as a landscape painter. His "landscapes have a visionary quality" reminiscent of the work of William Blake, John Linnell, and Samuel Palmer. Out of a lifetime output of some 430 paintings and 50 etchings, woodcuts, and book illustrations, his 1856 painting The Dream is perhaps his best-known work but his signal work is The Hymn of the Last Supper a very ambitious subject for him to undertake but one which worked out magnificently. His choice of subject was sometimes somewhat bizarre; one of his best paintings is The Death of Earl Siward which depicts the dying earl, dressed in full armour, standing up and being supported by his servants as 'He did not wish to die lying down like a cow'.

He was also an essayist and art critic; an article on Blake (in the form of a review of Alexander Gilchrist's Life of William Blake), which appeared in the January 1869 issue of the Quarterly Review, influenced and advanced recognition of Blake's artistic importance. Other Smetham articles for the Review were "Religious Art in England" (1861), "The Life and Times of Sir Joshua Reynolds" (1866), and "Alexander Smith" (1868). He also wrote some poetry.

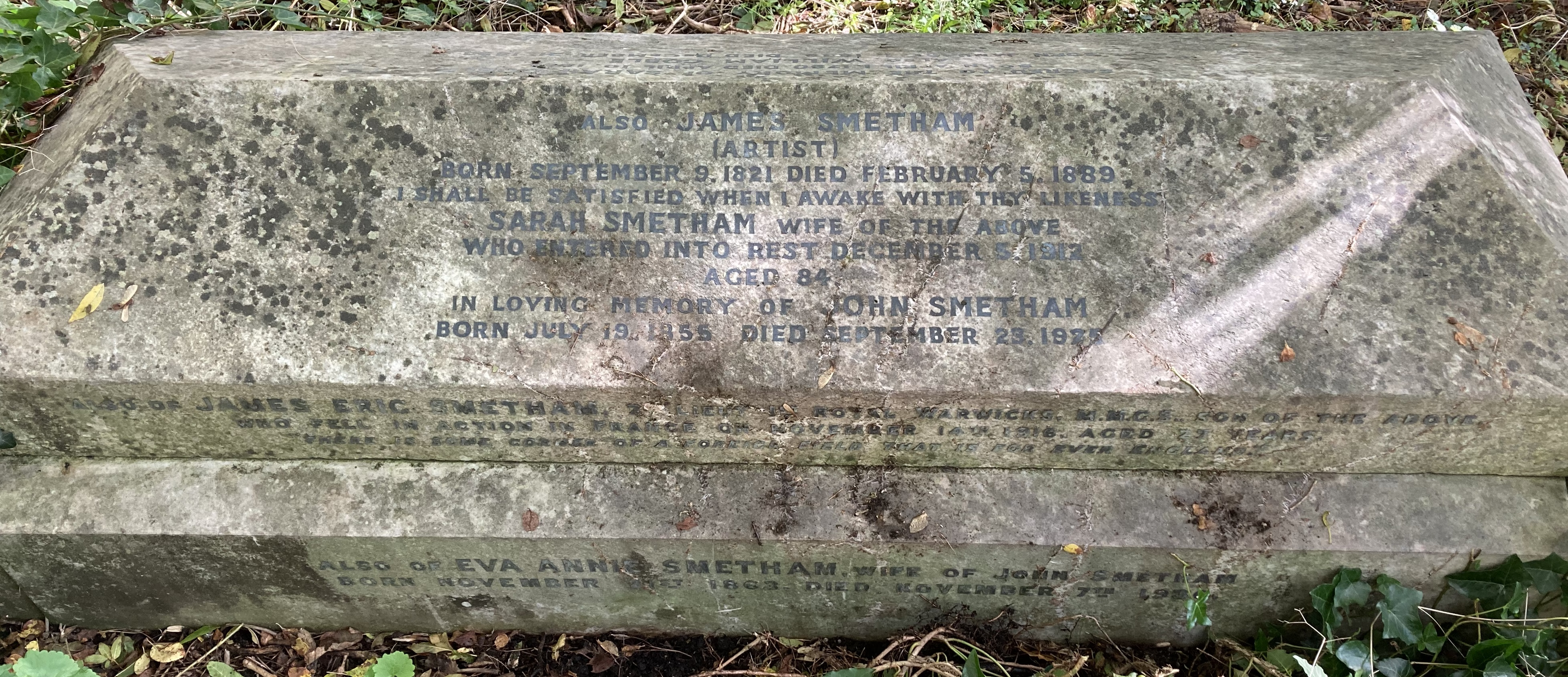
Family grave of James Smetham in Highgate Cemetery

Smetham was a devout Methodist, and after a mental breakdown in 1857, the second half of his life was marked by a growing religious mania and eventual insanity. "In one of his notebooks he attempted to illustrate every verse in the Bible." (Smetham habitually created miniature, postage-stamp-sized pen-and-ink drawings, in a process he called "squaring." He produced thousands of these in his lifetime.) He suffered a final breakdown in 1877 and lived in seclusion at his home in Stoke Newington until his death in 1889. He was buried in a family grave on the eastern side of Highgate Cemetery.

Smetham's letters, posthumously published by his widow, throw light upon Rossetti, John Ruskin, and other contemporaries, and have been praised for their literary and spiritual qualities. His surviving journals and notebooks show that Smetham practised an almost stream of consciousness type of writing that he called "ventilating," as a method of religious self-analysis. These writings delineate the depression that came to dominate Smetham's outlook.

== Gallery ==
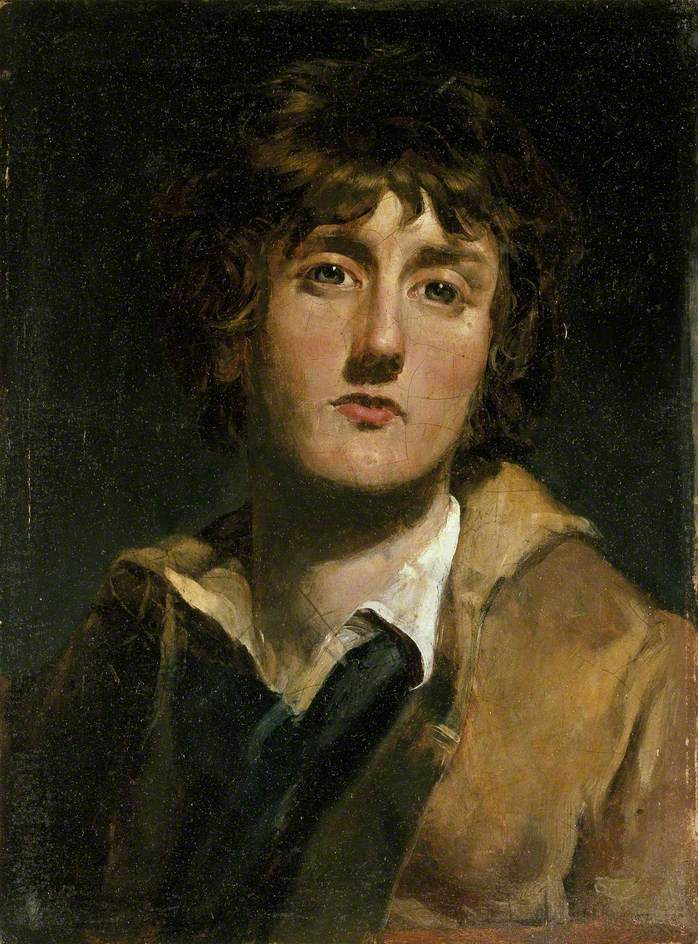
Thoughts Too Deep for Tears, 1844, oil on panel, Ashmolean Museum

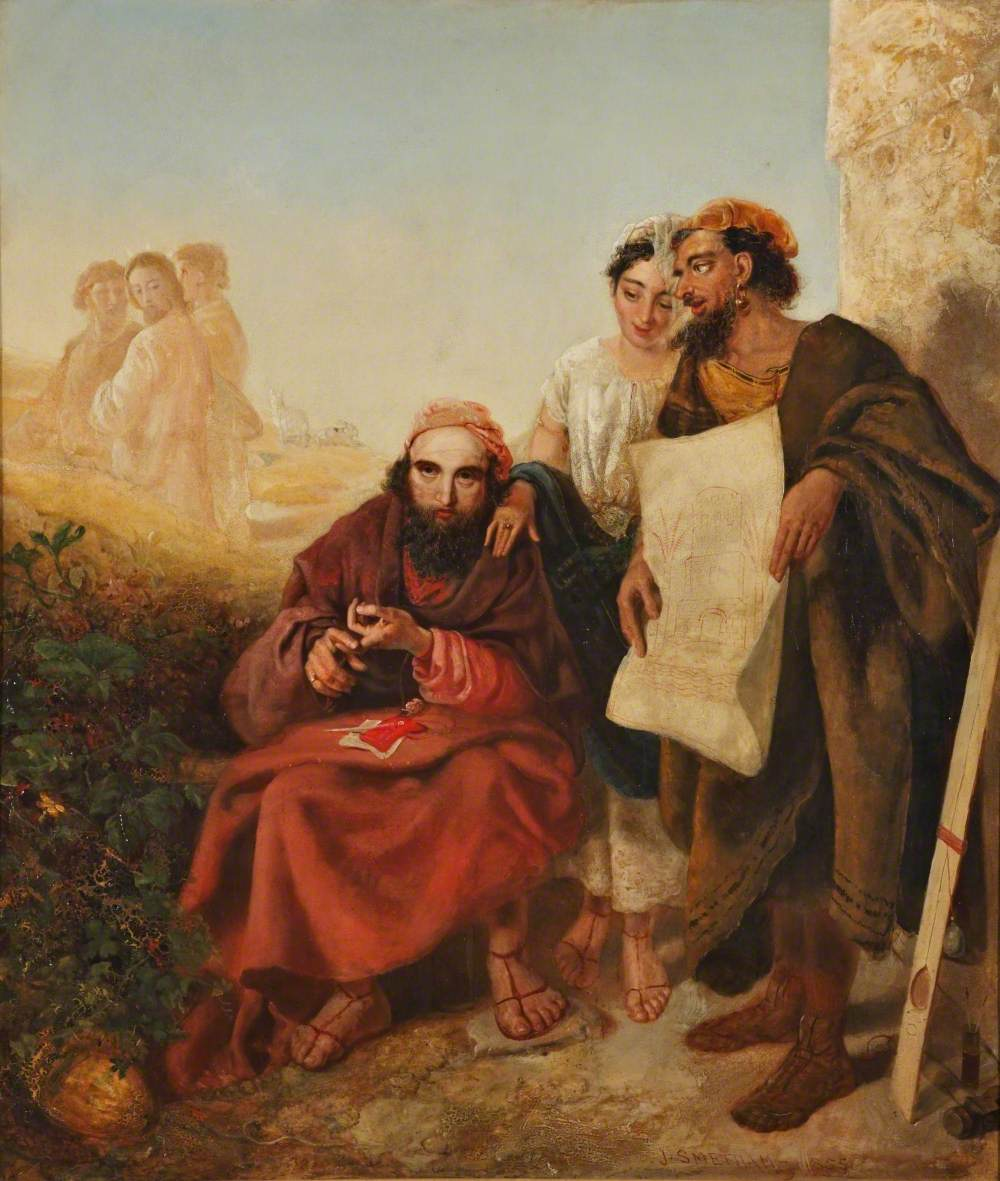
Counting the Cost, 1855, oil on canvas, Walker Art Gallery

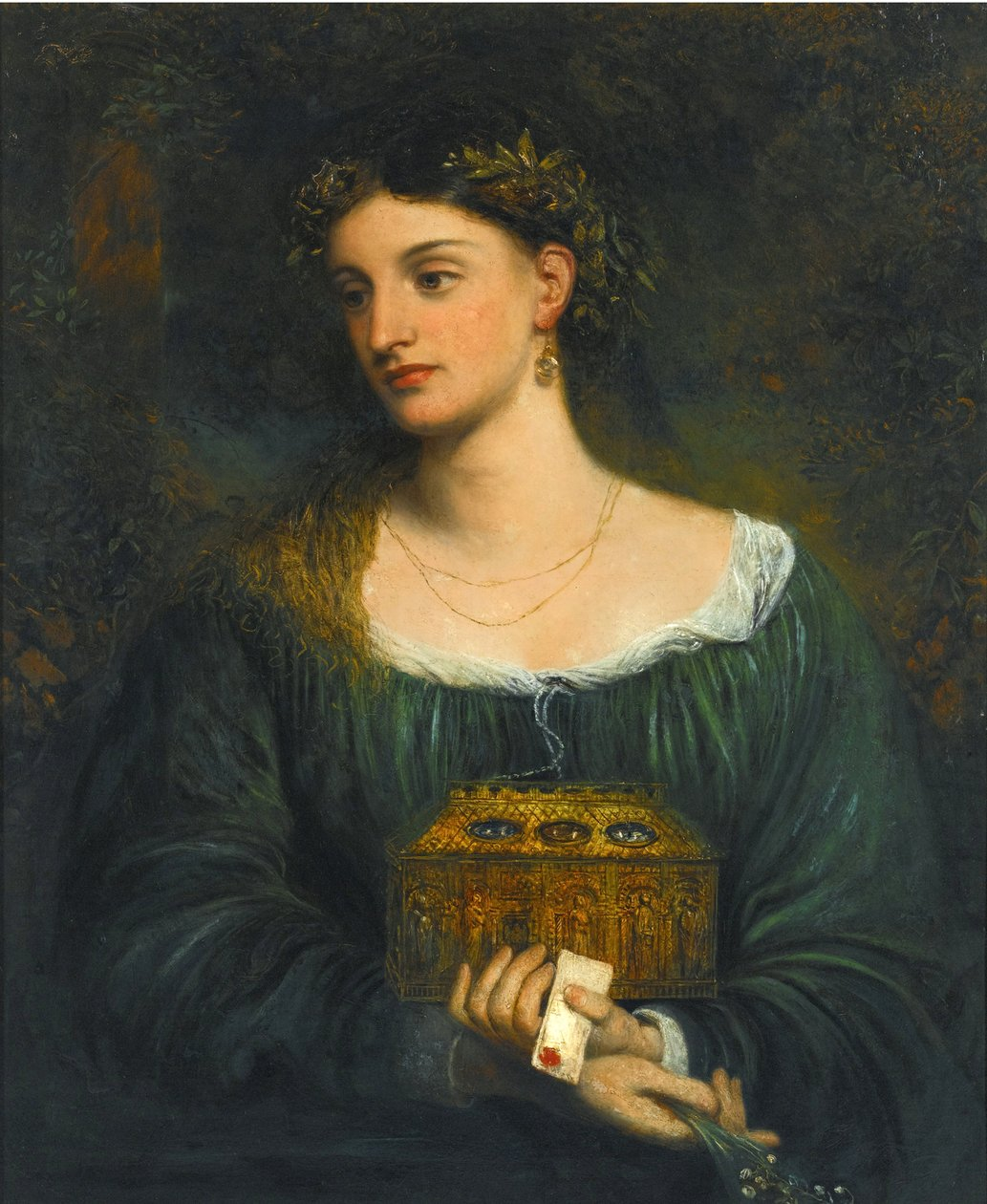
Pandora, 1865, oil on canvas, private collection

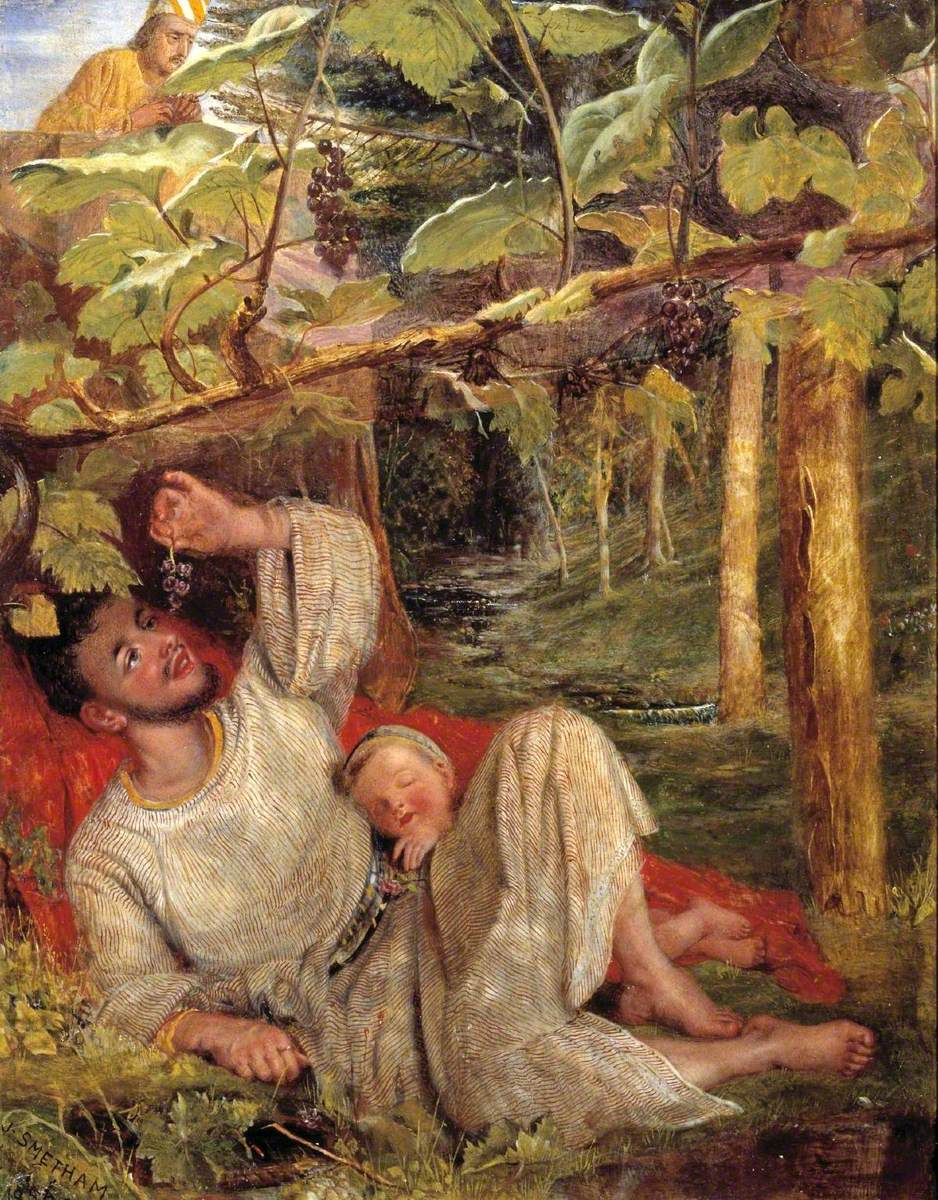
Naboth in his Vineyard, 1856, National Gallery, London

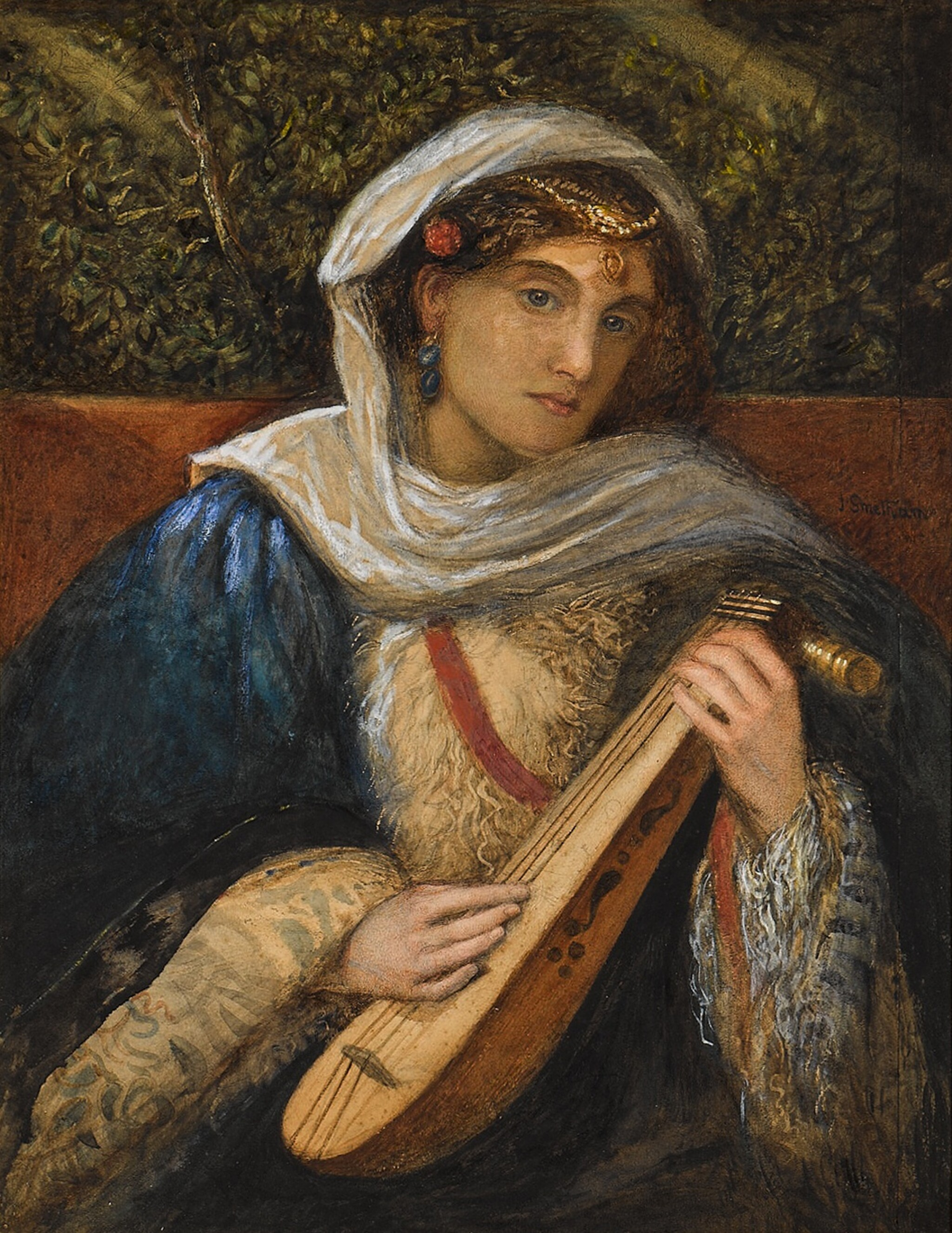
Girl with a Mandolin, oil on canvas, private collection

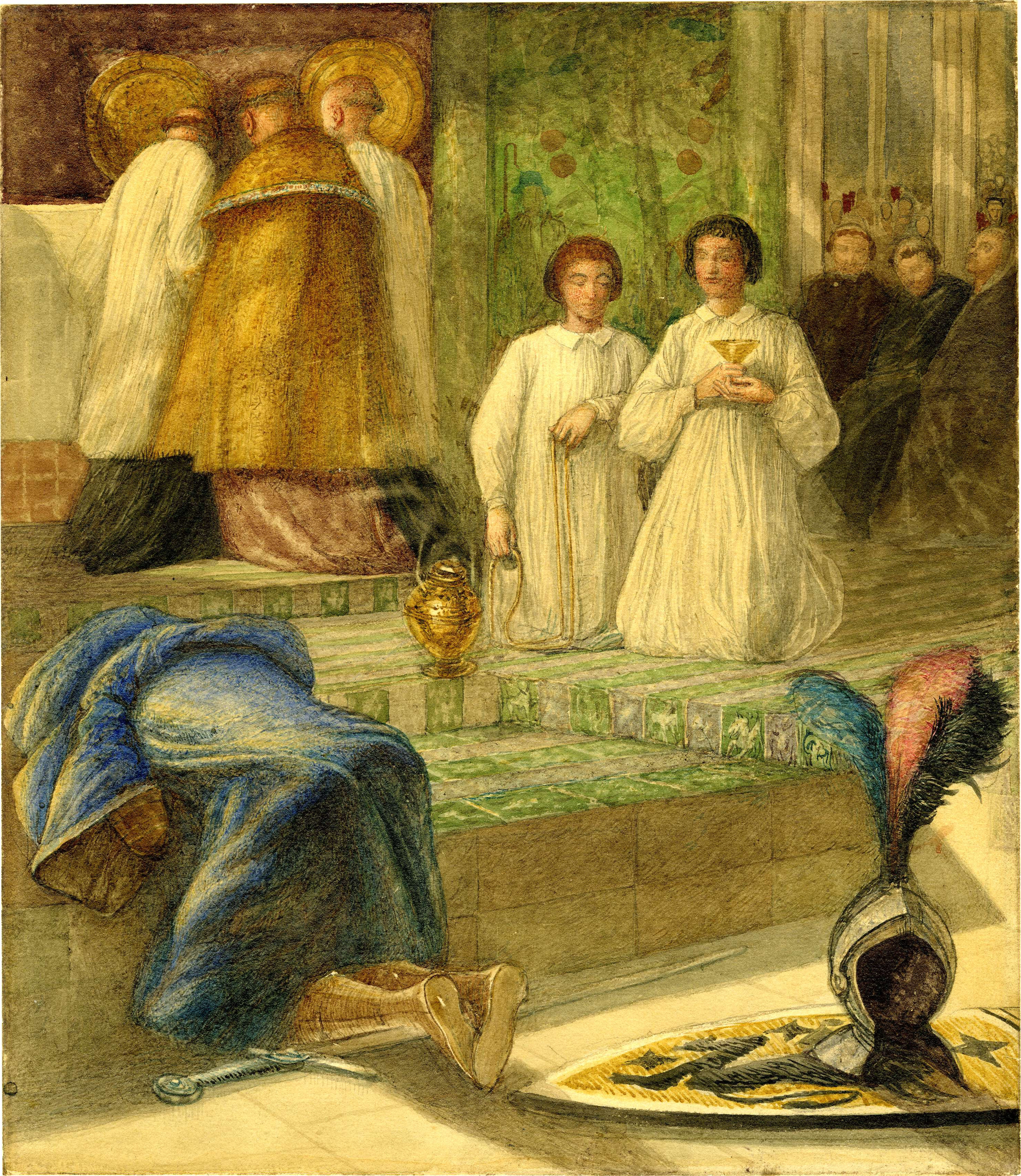
The King's Bridal, c. 1860, watercolour and graphite on paper, British Museum

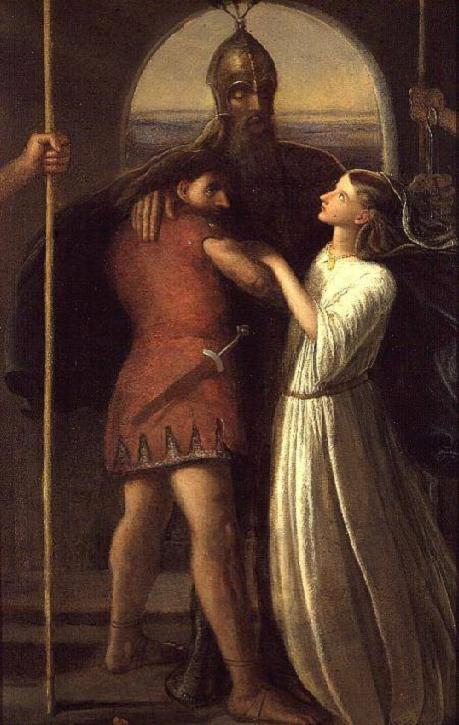
The Death of Earl Siward, 1861, Tate Britain

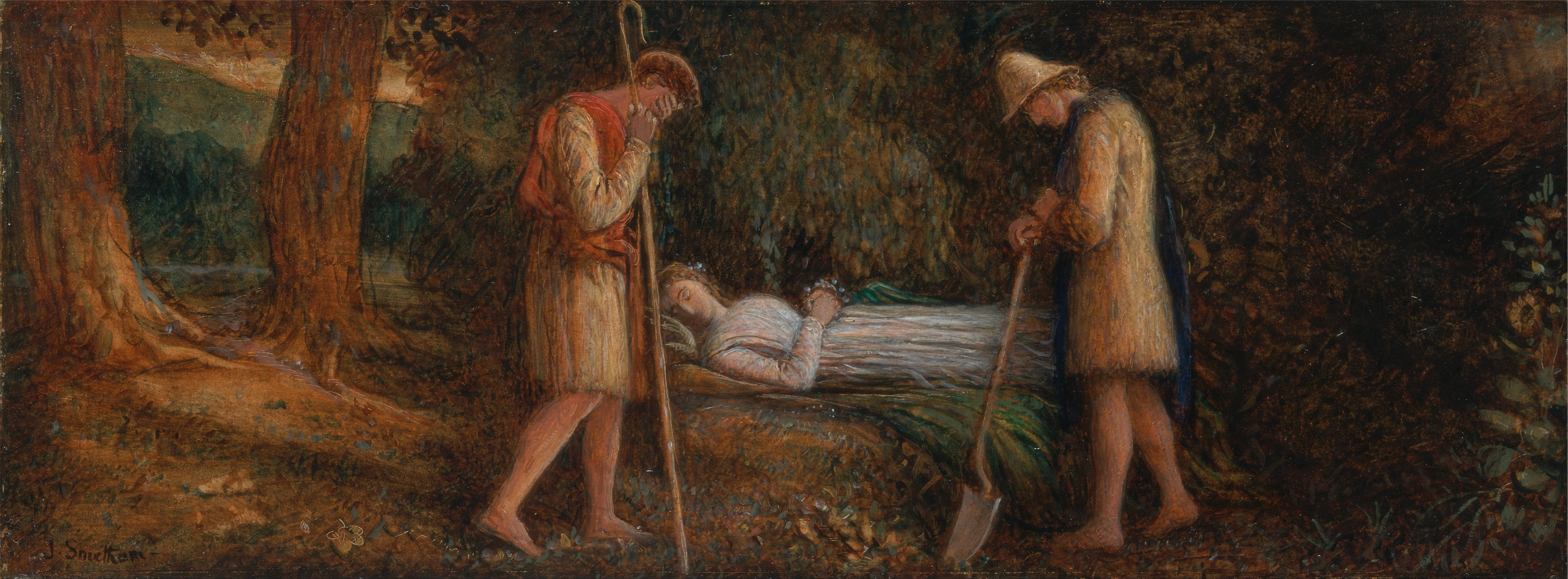
Imogen and the Shepherds, from Cymbeline, Act IV, scene ii, c. 1874, oil over ink on panel, Yale Center for British Art

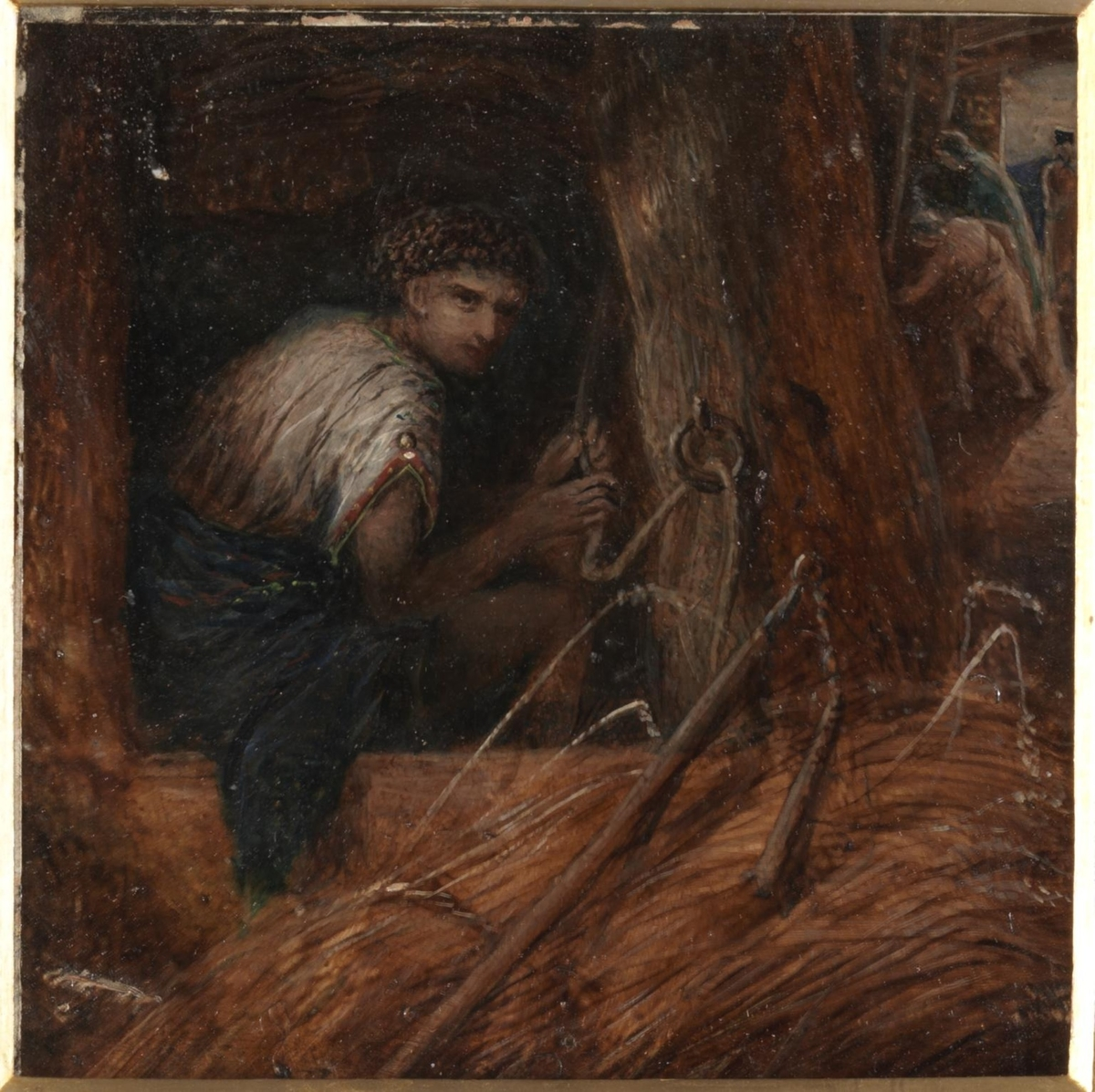
Saul Hiding, oil on wood, Tate Britain

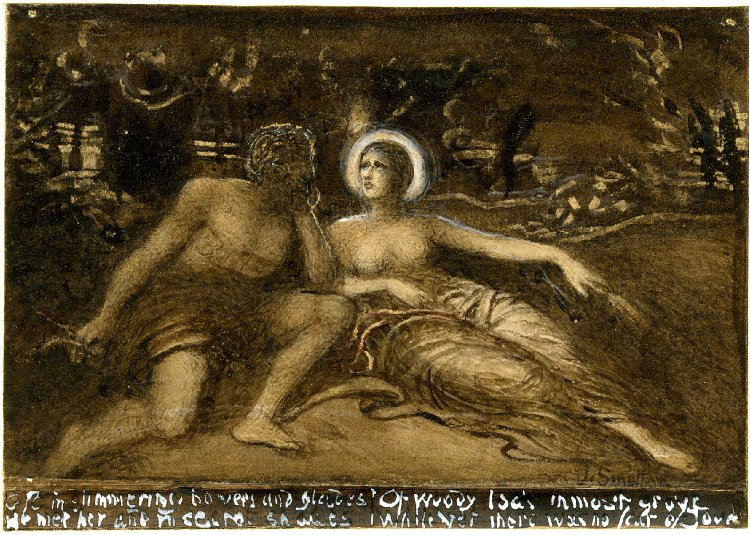
Paris and Oenone, brush drawing in brown wash, British Museum

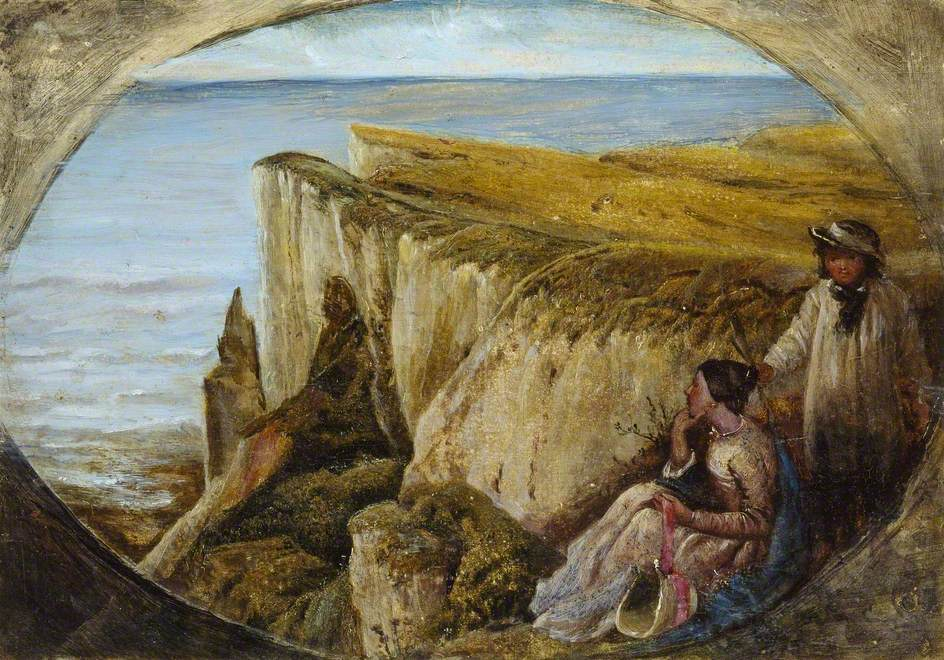
Beachy Head, oil on paper, Ashmolean Museum
