= Giolla Críost =

Gilla Críst, Gille Críst, and Giolla Críost are masculine Gaelic personal names meaning "servant of Christ".

== People with the name Gilla Críst ==
- Gilla Críst Ua Máel Eóin (died 1127), Irish historian
- Gilla Críst Ua Mocháin (fl. 1120s), Irish craftsman

== People with the name Gille Críst ==
- Gille Críst, Earl of Angus, Scottish magnate
- Gille Críst, Earl of Menteith, Scottish magnate
- Gille Críst, Earl of Mar, Scottish magnate

== People with the name Giolla Críost ==
- Giolla Críost Brúilingeach (fl. 1440), Scottish musician

== See also ==
- Gilchrist (surname), cognate surname
- Christian (given name)
