= Gilchrist =

Gilchrist may refer to:

== People ==
- Gilchrist (surname) (includes list of people with the name)

== Places ==
- Gilchrist, Allegan County, Michigan
- Gilchrist, Mackinac County, Michigan
- Gilchrist, Oregon
- Gilchrist, Texas
- Gilchrist County, Florida
- Gilchrist Township, Minnesota
