= Life of William Blake =

Poetry book

Life of William Blake, "Pictor Ignotus"
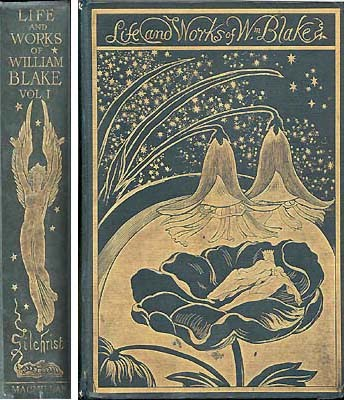
- cover for the 1880 edition
- Author: Alexander Gilchrist
- Cover artist: Frederic Shields
- Language: English
- Subject: William Blake
- Genre: biography
- Publication date: 1863; 1880
- Publication place: England

The Life of William Blake, "Pictor Ignotus." With selections from his poems and other writings is a two-volume work on the English painter and poet William Blake, first published in 1863. The first volume is a biography and the second a compilation of Blake's poetry, prose, artwork and illustrated manuscript.

The book was largely written by Alexander Gilchrist, who had spent many years compiling the material and interviewing Blake's surviving friends. However, it was left incomplete at Gilchrist's sudden death from scarlet fever in 1861. The work was published two years later, having been completed by his widow Anne Gilchrist with help from Dante Gabriel Rossetti and William Michael Rossetti.

The book became the first standard text on Blake and the foundation of the now-extensive scholarship on his life and work. The original 1863 edition was subtitled "Pictor Ignotus", Latin for "unknown artist", a common phrase used for unattributed artworks. Here it refers to Blake's obscurity at the time. The phrase was taken from the recently published poem of that title by Robert Browning, part of which was used as an epigraph. A second edition was published in 1880; this included additional material and revisions to the earlier transcripts of Blake's work and Gilchrist's bibliographical details. Both are referred as Gilchrist's Blake or Life.

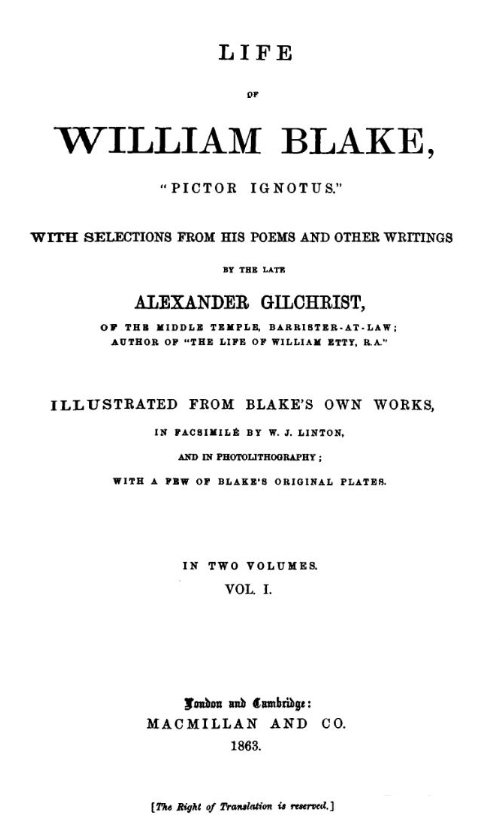
Gilchrist: Life of William Blake, 1863, title page

Several of Blake's short poems, such as "The Tyger", were typeset during his lifetime and had become widely known since the author's death in 1827, having been reproduced in commonplace books by William Wordsworth and others; however, the larger corpus of his work remained in relative obscurity.

The second volume, edited and annotated by Dante Gabriel Rossetti, included most of Blake's songs, verse and other poetry, his prose, and letters. These were often the first publication in typeset. The editors sometimes edited the works during transcription, printing "Tyger" as "Tiger" for example, and largely excluded discussion and republication of the 'Prophetic Books'. The transcriptions included the Poetical Sketches (selections), the Songs of Innocence and of Experience, the Book of Thel, and unpublished poetry from the manuscript "Ideas of Good and Evil". Prose works include the rare Descriptive Catalogue, Blake's description of the paintings exhibited at his solo exhibition in 1809. It includes his analysis of Chaucer's Canterbury Tales and an account of his panoramic depiction of the pilgrims leaving London.

The book reproduced many of Blake's illustrations from public and private collections, interspersed throughout the biography, and series of plates from his illuminated books. Many of these were engraved by William James Linton. Other designs, commentary, and the second edition's cover were provided by Frederic Shields.

Anne Gilchrist appended a memoir of her husband, Alexander, to the second volume.

A review by James Smetham of the first edition was included in the second as an "Essay on Blake". The biography of the second edition was expanded with Blake's letters, obtained in an 1878 sale at Sotheby's.
