= Glenchrest =

Historic house in New Hampshire, United States

- U.S. National Register of Historic Places
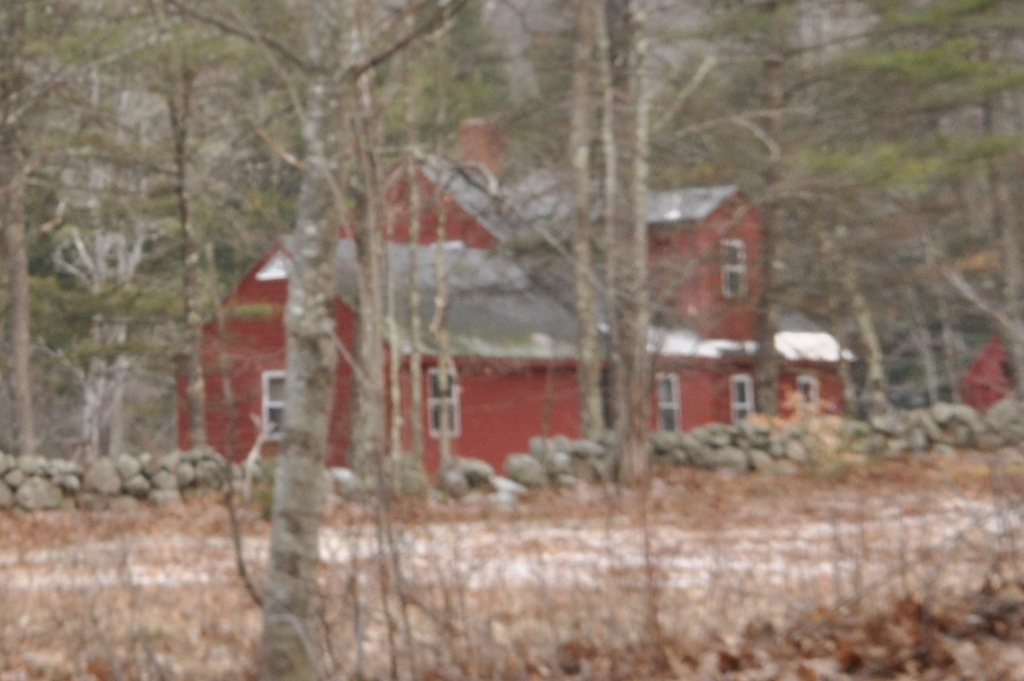

- Location within New Hampshire Location within the United States
- Location: NH 137, Harrisville, New Hampshire
- Coordinates: 42°55′38″N 72°0′54″W
- Area: 0.8 acres (0.32 ha)
- Built: 1802
- Architectural style: Cape cottage
- MPS: Harrisville MRA
- NRHP reference No.: 86003104
- Added to NRHP: January 14, 1988

Glenchrest is a historic farmstead on New Hampshire Route 137 in Harrisville, New Hampshire, United States. Built about 1802, it is a well-preserved local example of a Cape style farmhouse. It was listed on the National Register of Historic Places in 1988.

== Description and history ==
Glenchrest is located in a rural setting of eastern Harrisville, on the west side of New Hampshire Route 137 about 0.5 miles (0.80 km) south of its junction with Sargent Camp Road, and a short way south of Gilchrest, a similar period farmhouse. It is a 1 1/2-story wood-frame structure, with a gabled roof and clapboarded exterior.. It has a five bay facade, with windows arranged symmetrically around a center entrance. The entrance is flanked by sidelight windows. A gabled dormer projects from the roof above the entrance, and there is also a 1970s side ell extending to the left side. A garage stands behind the house. The property includes 19th-century plantings and stone walls.

The house was built about 1802 by Asa Fiske, who moved to the area from Holden, Massachusetts. The Fiske family owned it for 85 years, and it was purchased in 1915 by the Glenchrest family, who owned it at the time of its National Register listing in 1988. The property is a good example of an early farmstead, retaining an original layout of stone walls, plantings, and buildings.

== See also ==
- National Register of Historic Places listings in Cheshire County, New Hampshire
