= Percy Gilchrist =

British chemist and metallurgist

- Born: 27 December 1851; Lyme Regis
- Died: 16 December 1935 (aged 83)
- Education: Felsted
- Scientific career
- Fields: chemistry

Percy Carlyle Gilchrist FRS (27 December 1851 – 16 December 1935) was a British chemist and metallurgist.

== Life ==
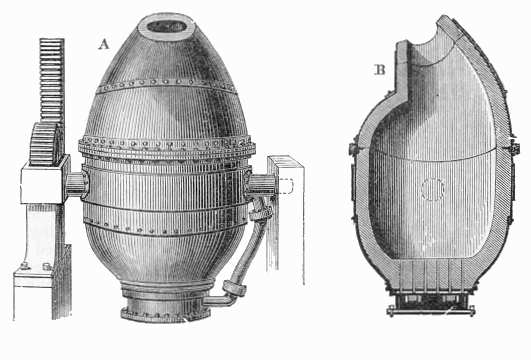
Bessemer converter, schematic diagram

Gilchrist was born in Lyme Regis, Dorset, the son of Alexander and Anne Gilchrist and studied at Felsted and the Royal School of Mines. He caught scarlet fever from his sister and was very ill. His father then caught the disease and died in November 1861.

He is best known for his collaboration with his cousin, Sidney Gilchrist Thomas, on the Gilchrist–Thomas process, which became the standard "basic process" for making steel. This enabled the production of low-phosphorus steel from local high-phosphorus ores by changing the standard acidic process to a basic process which meant that steel became cheaply available to British industry – low phosphorus ores requiring dearer importation. He developed the process, 1875–77, together with his cousin. It involved melting pig iron in a converter similar to that used in the Bessemer process and subjecting it to prolonged blowing. The oxygen in the blast of air oxidized carbon and other impurities, and the addition of lime at this stage caused the oxides to separate out as a slag (dross) on the surface of the molten metal. A side benefit was that the phosphorus-rich slag was an agricultural fertilizer.

He or his family had him admitted to well-appointed private asylum, Holloway Sanatorium from 5 March 1899 for just under one year, then discharged into single care. Noted are "eccentricities" and his role as an inventor.

He was elected vice-president of the Iron and Steel Institute and in 1891 a Fellow of the Royal Society.

He died in 1935. He had married Nora, the daughter of Captain L N Fitzmaurice of the Royal Navy.
