= Charlotte Gilchrist =

American fugitive slave escaped to Canada 1854

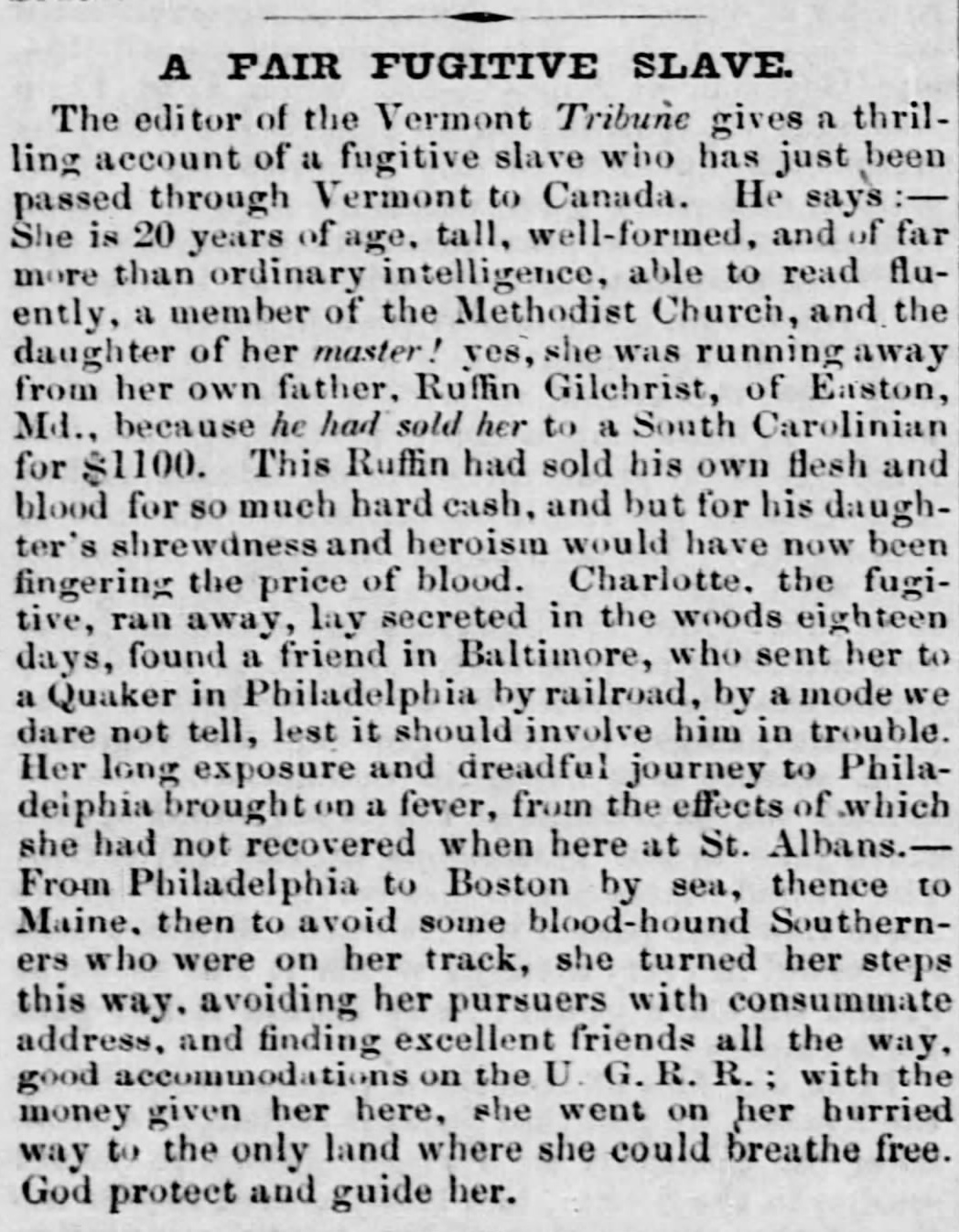
"A Fair Fugitive Slave" (The Liberator, August 11, 1854)

Charlotte Gilchrist (born c. 1834) was an American fugitive slave from Maryland who successfully escaped to Canada in 1854 with assistance from the people of the Underground Railroad.

== Life and escape ==
According to James Rodwell's retelling of her story:

CHARLOTTE GILCHRIST. The sufferings of this interesting young woman are reported in the Vermont Tribune in 1854, and are as follows: - "We were returning" (says the Tribune) "from the Republican Convention, held at the Vermont Central Railway, on Friday last, and meditating on the noble work done for freedom at Montpelier, when our reveries were interrupted by the introduction to our notice and care of a young female, a fugitive slave. The poor hunted girl is now, thank God, safe in the dominions of Queen Victoria, and we may without danger to her, relate some of the facts in her case. She is twenty years of age, tall, delicately formed, and handsome, with far more than ordinary intelligence, and can read and write fluently; is a member of the Methodist church, and the daughter of her master; yes, she was running away from her own father, one Ruffin Gilchrist, of Easton, Maryland, because he had sold her to a South Carolinian debauchee for one thousand one hundred dollars. This villain had sold his own daughter to infamy for so much hard cash, and, but for her shrewdness and heroism, would now have been fingering the price of her blood. Charlotte, the fugitive, ran away and lay secreted in the woods for eighteen days, then found a friend in Baltimore, who sent her by railway to a Quaker in Philadelphia, but by a mode they dare not tell, lest it should involve the noble-hearted Quaker in difficulties. But her long exposure and dreadful journey to Philadelphia brought on a fever, from the effects of which she had not recovered when here at St. Albans. She came from Philadelphia to Boston by sea, thence to Maine, and then, to avoid some bloodhound Southerners who were on her track, she turned her steps this way, avoiding her pursuers with consummate skill. She found excellent friends all the way, and with the money they provided she reached Canada unmolested, and now breathes the air of unsullied freedom. "It would have drawn tears from a stoic" (says the Tribune) to have heard her speak of her poor mother, still a slave, and her little sisters, daughters of the same unnatural villain who calls himself her master; to have heard her thank God for her own deliverance, and express her gratitude to the kind friends who cheered and helped her on her way. She made an attempt to escape when only sixteen years of age, but was retaken by dogs, and the marks of their fangs are still visible on her delicate throat, wrists, and fingers. But this dreadful experience did not deter her from making the second attempt, which, by the blessing of God, has proved more successful."

The most likely route from Rouses Point into Canada would have been the Champlain and St. Lawrence Railroad, which enters Canada just a mile from Rouses Point, though it's possible she instead went west on the Ogdensburg and Lake Champlain Railroad and crossed on one of its connecting lines. If she arrived in Rouses Point by train, it would have been on the Vermont Central Railroad, which passed through St. Albans. (Telegraph and Rail Road map of the New England States, Library of Congress g3721p.rr001090)

Gilchrist is said to have traveled via the Champlain Line, "an escape corridor between Albany–Troy, N.Y. and Quebec Province," entering Canada on a train departing Rouses Point, New York. Gilchrist may have passed through St. Albans, Vermont.

== See also ==
- Fugitive slaves in the United States
