= Archibald M. Gilchrist =

Alabama state legislator (1805–1854)

- Born: September 16, 1805; North Carolina
- Died: July 2, 1854 (aged 48); Alabama

Archibald McKay Gilchrist (September 16, 1805 – July 2, 1854) was a lawyer and an Alabama state legislator. He was originally from North Carolina and attended the University of North Carolina, graduating in 1826. He and his half-brother James G. Gilchrist were partners in a law firm in Hayneville, Alabama, the county seat of Lowndes County. He represented Lowndes County, Alabama in the Alabama State Senate in 1844 and 1845. In 1847 he opposed the Wilmot Proviso. He was buried at a place called Hilburn. He had a son, John Mushat Gilchrist, who was a captain of the 5th Alabama and died of wounds received at the Battle of Cold Harbor.

== Sources ==
- Brewer, W. (1872). Alabama, her history, resources, war record, and public men: from 1540 to 1872. Montgomery, Alabama: Barrett & Brown. OCLC 2667343.
- Garrett, William (1872). Reminiscences of Public Men in Alabama, for Thirty Years. Atlanta, Georgia: Plantation Publishing Company's Press. LCCN 03005685. OCLC 1117559.
- McLean, Angus Wilton; Purcell, John Edwin I; Singletary, Archibald Gilchrist; Purcell, John Edwin II (1942). Lumber River Scots and their Descendants; the McLeans, the Torreys, the Purcells, the McIntyres, the Gilchrists. Richmond: The William Byrd Press.
