= Len Gilchrist =

English footballer

Personal information
- Full name: Leonard Gilchrist
- Date of birth: 5 September 1881
- Place of birth: Burton-on-Trent, England
- Date of death: 1958 (aged 76–77)
- Position: Inside forward

Senior career*
Years	Team	Apps	(Gls)
1901–1902	Tamworth Athletic		
1902–1903	Burton Rangers		
1903–1904	Burton United	34	(12)
1904–1905	Derby County	11	(0)
1906	Coventry City		
Total		45	(12)
- * Club domestic league appearances and goals

Leonard Gilchrist (5 September 1881–1958) was an English footballer who played in the Football League for Burton United and Derby County.
