= Life (cereal) =

Breakfast cereal made by Quaker Oats Company

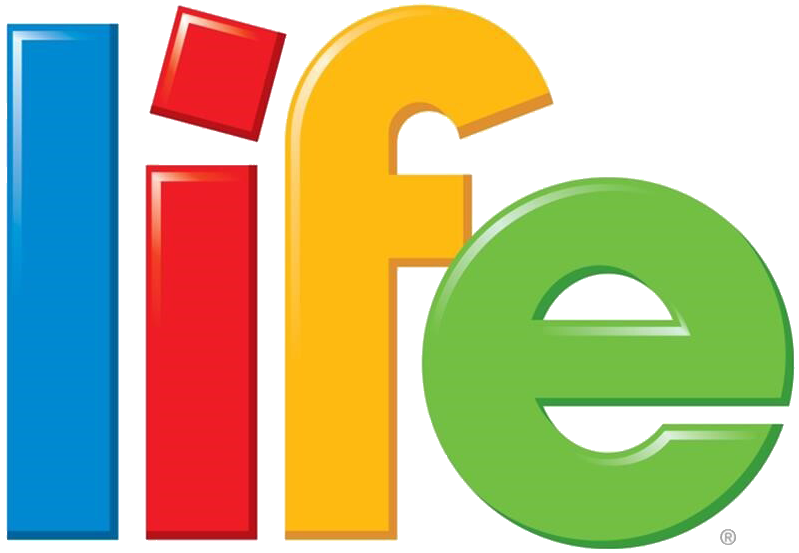

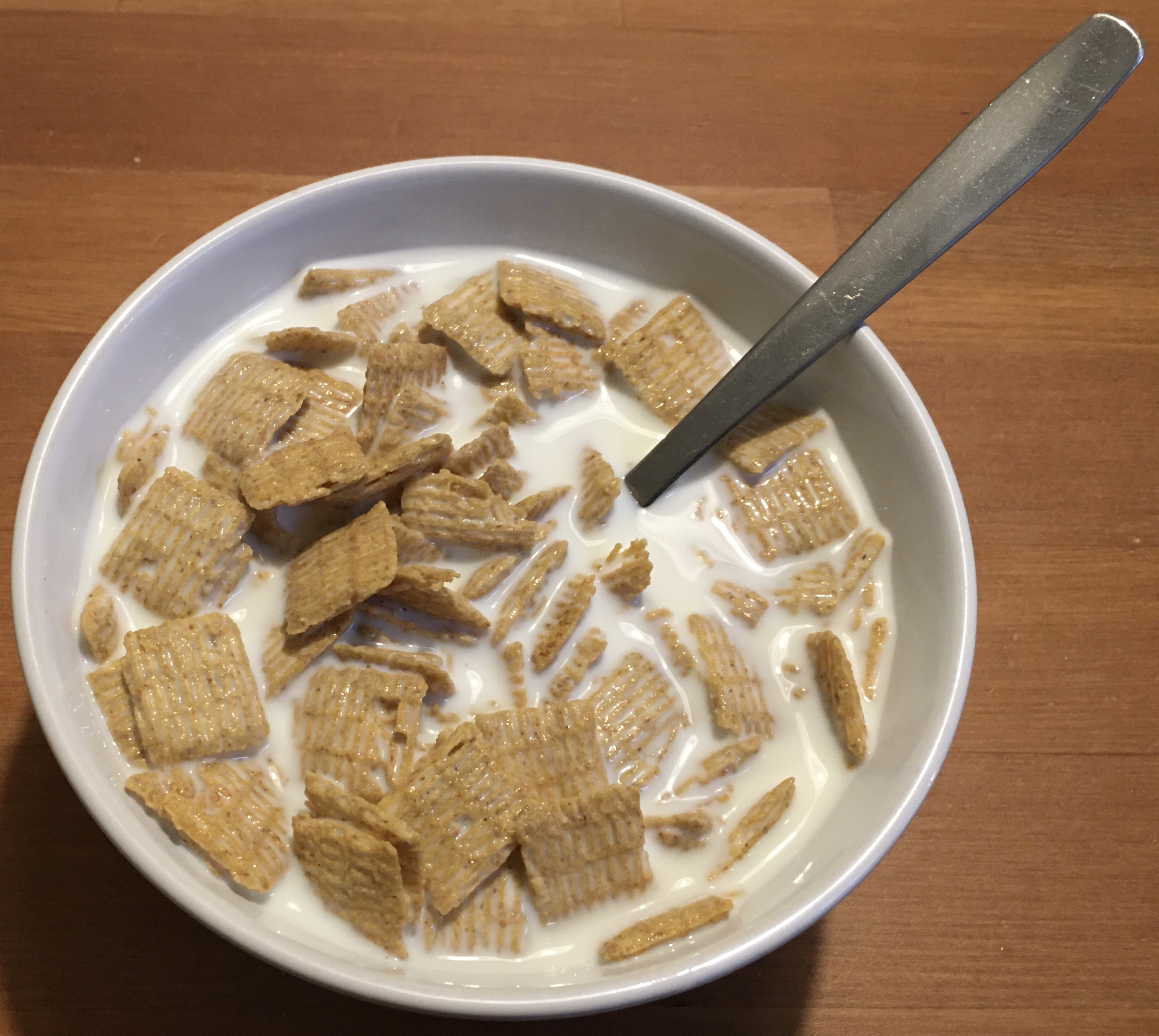
- Quaker Life Multigrain Cereal, with milk
- Product type: Breakfast cereal
- Current owner: Quaker Oats
- Country: U.S.
- Introduced: 1961; 65 years ago
- Website: quakeroats.com/life

Life is a breakfast cereal produced by the Quaker Oats Company. Introduced in 1961, the cereal has a brown, checked square pattern and mainly consists of oat flour, corn flour, added sugar, and whole-wheat flour. As of 2018, because of the numerous varieties the cereal has, the original cereal is now marketed as "Life Original Multigrain Cereal".

== Ingredients ==
The cereal itself contains whole grain oat flour, corn flour, sugar, whole wheat flour, calcium carbonate, salt, baking soda, tocopherols (for artificial preservation), and B vitamins. It formerly contained the artificial preservative BHT; this was removed in late 2021.

== Advertising ==
When the cereal was first introduced in the 1960s, the original slogan was "The most useful protein ever in a ready-to-eat cereal". The original mascots (in commercials narrated by Paul Frees) were munchkin-like characters.

Life was popularized during the 1970s by an advertising campaign featuring "Little Mikey", a hard-to-please four-year-old boy portrayed by John Gilchrist. The commercials featured the slogan "He likes it! Hey, Mikey!" said in surprise after his brothers see Mikey enjoying the cereal.

The ad campaign was created by ad firm Doyle Dane and Bernbach. The campaign ran from 1972 to 1986, becoming one of the longest-running television advertisements in history. A subsequent commercial repeated the scenario with the same dialog but used lumberjacks instead of children.

== Varieties ==
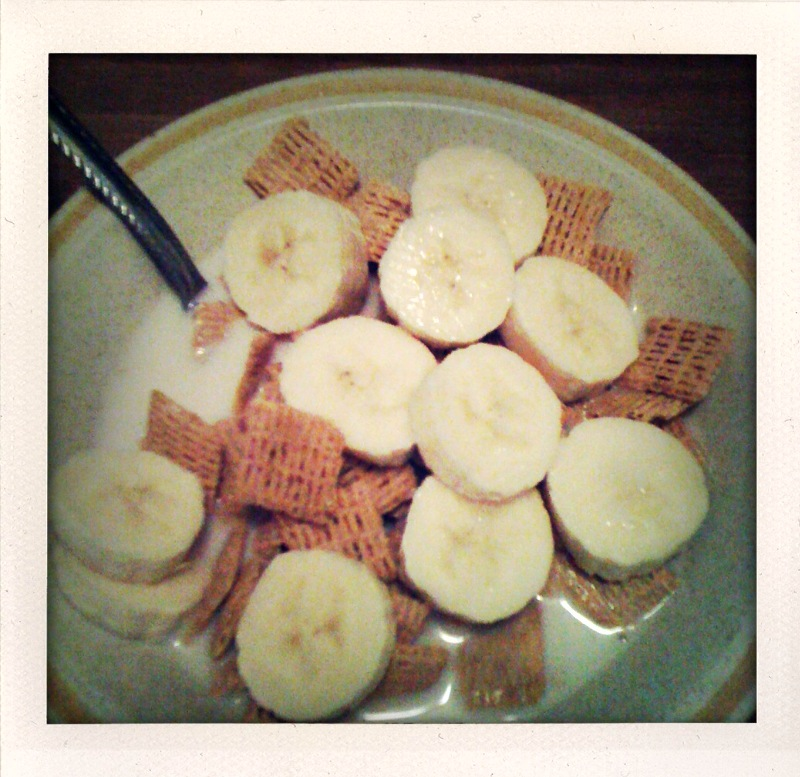
Life cereal with banana slices

In 1978, Cinnamon Life, developed by Ed Heaton, was introduced by the Quaker Oats Company and was followed shortly thereafter by Raisin Life. Today, Cinnamon Life accounts for one-third of total Life sales. The Raisin Life variant sold poorly and was discontinued in the mid-1980s.

In 2002, a version of the cereal called Baked Apple Life was released. Honey Graham Life was introduced in early 2004, Life Vanilla Yogurt Crunch in late 2005, and Life Chocolate Oat Crunch, in 2006. All three were discontinued by 2008.

In 2008, Quaker introduced Maple & Brown Sugar Life, which was discontinued at an unknown time. In the fall of 2016, Vanilla Life cereal was released. Chocolate Life cereal was also released not long afterwards, but it too was eventually discontinued. As of October 2025, there are four non-seasonally produced varieties of Life cereal: Original, Cinnamon, "Mighty Life" Very Vanilla (which replaced the original vanilla variety), and "Mighty Life" Strawberry Blueberry Bliss. In late 2024 the seasonal Hot Cocoa Life was introduced for the winter holidays.

Original Life has had its recipe changed several times since its introduction.
