= Gilla Críst Ua Mocháin =

Gilla Críst Ua Mocháin (fl. 1120s) was an Irish craftsman.

== Background ==
Gilla Críst Ua Mocháin was a member of a Connacht family who "were a prominent Connacht ecclesiastical family". There were two apparently distinct families: one were natives of the diocese of Kilmacduagh, apparently from the vicinity of Ballyvaughan (Baile Uí Bheacháin); another were of Cill Athracht, taobh le Loch Gara i County Sligo. Two other unrelated families of the name, natives of what are now County Donegal and County Monaghan.

The Annals of Connacht mentions members of the family, sub anno 1361, 1392, 1414, 1460, 1470–71. The name is now variously rendered as Maughan, Moghan, Mohan, and Moughan, and found mainly in County Galway and County Mayo.

== Shrine of Colmáin mac Lúacháin ==
Following the re-discovery of the relics of Colmáin mac Lúacháin, patron saint of Lann (now Lynn, near Lough Ennell in County Westmeath in 1122 – they had been concealed and forgotten during the Viking Age – Gilla Críst Ua Mocháin became responsible for the construction a new shrine for the relics. This was apparently at the behest of the head or erenagh of Lann, Gilla Críst mac Gilla Pátric, and during the reign of King Murchad of Mide (died 1153).

=== Destruction of shrine ===
The church of Lann, with its shrine and relics, were destroyed in 1394 by the king of Cenél Fiachrach, Muirchertach Óg Mac Eochagáin.

== Other bearers of the name ==
- Gregorius Ó Mocháin, Bishop of Elphin 1357–72, Archbishop of Tuam 1372–1383
- Gregorius Ó Mocháin, Bishop of Elphin, 1383, Bishop of Derry, 1394
- Gregorius Ó Mocháin II, Archbishop of Tuam, 1384–86
- Cornelius Ó Mochain, Abbot of Boyle to 1449, Bishop of Achonry 1449–73

== Sources ==
- Bertha Colmáin maic Lúacháin. Life of Colmán maic Lúacháin, pp.v-vi, Kuno Meyer, Dublin, 1911.
- A Midhe is maith da bhá mar: thoughts on medieval Mide, pp. 373–82, Edel Bhreathnach, in Above and Beyond: essays in memory of Leo Swan, ed. Condit and Corlett, 2005.
