= Agnes Addison Gilchrist =

American architectural historian

- Born: Agnes Eleanor Addison; December 25, 1907; Philadelphia, Pennsylvania, U.S.
- Died: July 3, 1976 (aged 68); Falmouth, Massachusetts, U.S.
- Occupations: Architectural historian, educator, biographer, editor
- Known for: President, Society of Architectural Historians (1954)

Agnes Eleanor Addison Gilchrist (December 25, 1907 – July 3, 1976) was an American architectural historian. She was president of the Society of Architectural Historians in 1954, and the first architectural historian hired by the National Park Service in 1957. She especially studied landmarks in Philadelphia, New York City and Mount Vernon, New York.

== Early life and education ==
Gilchrist was born in Philadelphia, the daughter of William Henry Fitzgerald Addison and Eleanor Corkhill Adams Addison. Her father was a medical school professor and her mother was a poet. She graduated from Wellesley College in 1930. She earned a master's degree in medieval history at the University of Pennsylvania in 1933, and completed doctoral studies in modern history in 1938, with a dissertation titled Romanticism and the Gothic Revival. She also studied at the Sorbonne in 1935, at the Courtauld Institute of Art in 1936, and at Harvard University in 1940.

== Career ==
Gilchrist taught at the University of Pennsylvania, Randolph-Macon Woman's College, and New York University. In 1940, she was a founding member of the Society of Architectural Historians. She served on the society's board of directors and advisory board, and was president of the society in 1954. "People live in houses and pass in and out of buildings every day but they never see the buildings, even if they look at them," she told an interviewer in 1959.

From 1951 to 1958 she served on the board of directors of the Municipal Art Society of New York City. She became the first architectural historian hired by the National Park Service in 1957, to edit the Historic American Buildings Newsletter. she did research on New York's colonial architecture in the Netherlands from 1959 to 1960.

In 1962, Gilchrist became a researcher for the New York City Landmarks Preservation Commission. She was founder and president of the Mount Vernon Landmarks and Historical Society in 1964. She also served at least three terms on the Mount Vernon Board of Architectural Review in the 1960s. She was a researcher at the National Portrait Gallery from 1966 until she retired in 1967.

== Publications ==
Gilchrist's biography of architect William Strickland was called "a fascinating account" in the Nashville Banner. In addition to her scholarly books and articles, Gilchrist wrote two one-act plays. She directed an amateur production of her own play, A Dish of Tea, in 1953.

- Catalogue of Portraits in the University of Pennsylvania (1940)
- "Current Bibliography of Architectural History" (1948, with Edwin C. Rae, John G. Replinger, Alan K. Laing and Leonarda F. Laing)
- William Strickland, Architect and Engineer, 1788 – 1854 (1950)
- "Market Houses in High Street" (1953)
- "The Philadelphia Exchange: William Strickland, Architect" (1953)
- "Girard College: An Example of the Layman's Influence on Architecture" (1957)
- "A Trautwine Building Identified" (1958)
- "John Haviland before 1816" (1961)
- "Notes for a Catalogue of the John McComb (1763-1853) Collection of Architectural Drawings in the New-York Historical Society" (1969)
- "John McComb, Sr. and Jr., in New York, 1784-1799" (1972)

== Personal life ==
Addison married engineer John Mason Gilchrist in 1942. They had two sons, John and James. Her husband died in 1975, and she died in 1976, at the age of 68, at a hospital in Falmouth, Massachusetts.
