= Gilchrest =

Historic house in New Hampshire, United States

- U.S. National Register of Historic Places
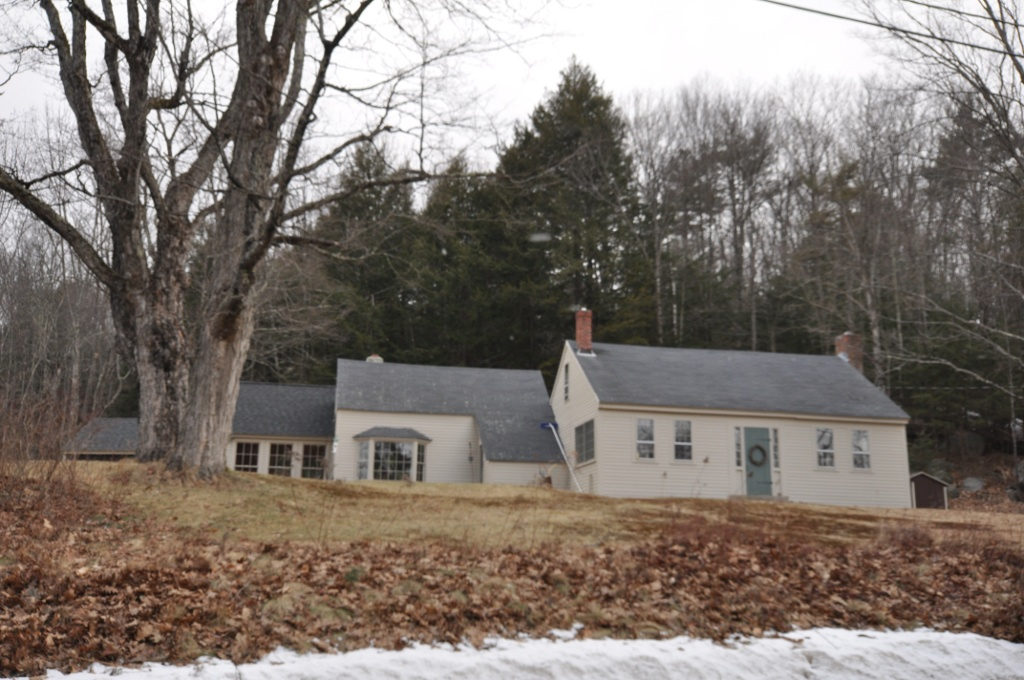

- Location within New Hampshire Location within the United States
- Location: NH 137, Harrisville, New Hampshire
- Coordinates: 42°55′44″N 72°0′57″W
- Area: 0.7 acres (0.28 ha)
- Built: 1817
- Architectural style: Cape cottage
- MPS: Harrisville MRA
- NRHP reference No.: 86003105
- Added to NRHP: January 14, 1988

Gilchrest is a historic farmstead on New Hampshire Route 137 in Harrisville, New Hampshire, United States. Built in 1817, it is one of a cluster of early 19th-century hill farm Cape style houses in eastern Harrisville. It was listed on the National Register of Historic Places in 1988.

== Description and history ==
Gilchrest is located in a rural setting of eastern Harrisville, on the west side of New Hampshire Route 137, about 0.4 miles (0.64 km) south of its junction with Sargent Camp Road, and a short way north of Glenchrest, one of the other early farmsteads. It is a 1 1/2-story wood-frame structure, with a gabled roof, end chimneys, and clapboarded exterior. Its main facade is five bays wide, with windows arranged symmetrically around the center entrance. The entry is flanked by sidelight windows. A series of single-story ells are stepped to the main block's left. The property also includes a surviving 19th century pine shed and root cellar.

The house was built in 1817, during the area's height as a hill farming community. It was owned by three generations of the Gilchrest family, and was sold out of that family in 1931. The house is notable for having been kept particularly well preserved, and still includes many original interior finishes and fixtures.

== See also ==
- National Register of Historic Places listings in Cheshire County, New Hampshire
