= Anne Gilchrist (collector) =

British folk song collector

Anne Geddes Gilchrist O.B.E., F.S.A
- Born: 8 December 1863; Manchester, England
- Died: 24 July 1954 (aged 90)
- Occupation: Folk song collector

Anne Geddes Gilchrist OBE FSA (8 December 1863 – 24 July 1954) was a British folk song collector. Although less well-known than her London-based counterparts, her expertise was acknowledged by Cecil Sharp, Lucy Broadwood, and John Masefield.

== Life and work ==
Anne Geddes Gilchrist was born in Manchester, to Scottish parents. She had a musical upbringing and was related to Rev Neil Livingston, who compiled a psalter. After meeting Sabine Baring-Gould she became involved with folk music and joined the editorial board of the Folk-Song Society in 1906. She had an unusually good memory for hymn tunes, one of her areas of expertise. Gilchrist is a neglected figure because she did not write any books. Instead she contributed many scholarly articles to the Journal of the Folk-Song Society.

In the very first edition of the Journal of the Folk-Song Society she wrote an article on the song Long Lankin. She reports that a woman in Northumberland used to frighten children by shouting "There's Long Lankin". Gilchrist collected songs from Scotland and the north-west of England. This was particularly valuable, as few folk-song collections had been made from that part of England. Following the discovery of a medieval sculpted stone in Cumberland, she was admitted to the Society of Antiquaries in 1935, at the age of 70. She was awarded the OBE in 1948 for her services to folk song and dance. Her last scholarly article was written at the age of 79. Her papers are lodged in the Vaughan Williams Memorial Library.
