= Anne Gilchrist (writer) =

English writer (1828–1885)

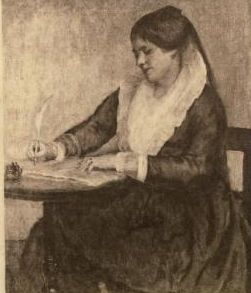
Mrs. Anne Gilchrist (c. 1882)

Anne Gilchrist (née Burrows; 25 February 1828 – 29 November 1885) was an English writer, best known for her connection to American poet Walt Whitman.

== Life ==
She was born in 1828 to John Parker and Henrietta Burrows. Her father died after a horse riding accident when she was eleven and she was brought up in London.

She came from a distinguished Essex family, and married the art and literary critic Alexander Gilchrist in 1851 after a two-year engagement. Five years later, in Chelsea, west London, the couple became next-door neighbours of Thomas Carlyle and Jane Welsh Carlyle, both of them notable writers. The Gilchrists' marriage, one of intellectual equals, was cut short when Alexander died of scarlet fever in 1861. Her daughter Beatrice had originally caught the disease and then her son, Percy, suffered it as his sister recovered. Her husband caught the disease from his son.

She was left with their four children: Percy, Beatrice, Herbert, and Grace. One of the reasons for the family's move to Philadelphia in 1876 was Beatrice's desire to attend medical school. Beatrice eventually became a physician in Edinburgh, but she killed herself shortly thereafter. Percy had a successful career developing a new and economic way of making steel and Herbert was a minor painter.

== Work ==
After her husband's death in 1861, Anne completed his Life of Blake and was an active contributor to magazines.

She is perhaps best known for developing a deep attachment to Walt Whitman when she read Leaves of Grass in 1869, and for writing the first great criticism of that work, A Woman's Estimate of Walt Whitman; their correspondence was initiated through William Michael Rossetti. When she eventually travelled to Philadelphia, in 1876, she met Whitman and they formed a lasting friendship. She moved to New England in 1878, but returned to England the following year. In 1883, she published a biography of the writer Mary Lamb.
