= John Gilchrist (footballer, born 1900) =

Scottish footballer

Personal information
- Full name: John Gilchrist
- Date of birth: 15 April 1900
- Place of birth: Kirkintilloch, Scotland
- Date of death: 1950 (aged 49–50)
- Place of death: Birkenhead, England
- Height: 5 ft 11 in (1.80 m)
- Position: Right half

Senior career*
Years	Team	Apps	(Gls)
–	Strathclyde		
1918–1919	St Anthony's		
1919–1923	Celtic	127	(6)
1923–1924	Preston North End		
1924	→ Carlisle United (loan)		
1924–1925	Third Lanark	3	(0)
1924–1925	→ Dunfermline Athletic (loan)	5	(0)
1925	Brooklyn Wanderers		
1926	Pawtucket Rangers		

International career
1921–1922	Scottish League XI	2	(0)
1922	Scotland	1	(0)
- * Club domestic league appearances and goals

John Gilchrist (15 April 1900 – 1950) was a Scottish footballer, who played for Celtic, Preston North End, Carlisle United, Third Lanark and Scotland.

== Career ==
Gilchrist signed for Celtic in 1919 from junior side St Anthony's, where he had won the Scottish Junior Cup. He made his debut on 18 August 1919 in a league match against Dumbarton, the first of 134 league and Scottish Cup appearances for Celtic. He turned in impressive performances at half-back, which saw him capped for Scotland in April 1922, a 1–0 win over England at Villa Park. In that campaign he made 48 club appearances as Celtic won the 1921–22 Scottish Division One title. However, Gilchrist had a strained relationship with manager Willie Maley whose disciplinary orders he was reluctant to follow. He was warned several times for his poor attitude towards training, before eventually being suspended sine die for "wilful inattention to training" in January 1923.

On 23 January, Gilchrist signed for Preston North End for a reported transfer fee of £4,500. He was not a success at Preston and almost exactly a year later the club terminated his contract. After a brief spell as player-coach at Carlisle United, he moved back to Scotland in the summer of 1924 to join Third Lanark. He played only three games there before he was sold on to Dunfermline. Again, his stay was very brief and he lasted less than a month in Fife.

His career in football was now all but over. In the summer of 1925, he sailed to New York. He joined Brooklyn Wanderers but made just six appearances, then finally had a year at Pawtucket Rangers, playing only three games in his time there.
