= William Sidney Gilchrist =

Canadian missionary (1901–1970)

Sid Gilchrist
- Born: William Sidney Gilchrist; 1901; Pictou, Nova Scotia, Canada
- Died: June 14, 1970 (aged 68–69); Red Deer, Alberta, Canada
- Education: Dalhousie University, University of Lisbon
- Spouse: Frances Harriet Killam
- Children: 9
- Military career
- Allegiance: Canada
- Branch: Royal Canadian Army Medical Corps
- Rank: Major
- Unit: North Nova Scotia Regiment
- Conflicts: World War II
- Awards: Member of the Order of the British Empire

William Sidney "Sid" Gilchrist (1901–1970) was a Canadian Protestant missionary, who lived from 1901 in Pictou, Nova Scotia to June 14, 1970 in Red Deer, Alberta. He spent 38 years as a medical missionary in Portuguese West Africa, (now Angola).

== Early life and education ==
Sid Gilchrist was the youngest of five children. His ancestry was Scottish and Presbyterian, and he graduated in medicine from Dalhousie University. Two years before he completed his medical studies, Sidney Gilchrist married fellow student Frances Harriet Killam of Halifax. When he completed his medical studies they volunteered to go abroad as medical missionaries.

== Career ==
In 1928, the Gilchrists were appointed to Angola by the Board of Overseas Missions of the United Church of Canada.

Before traveling Portuguese colony on the west coast of Africa, the Gilchrists spent a year in Portugal, studying both Portuguese and the African languages spoken in Angola. During this time Dr. Gilchrist earned a Diploma in Tropical Medicine at the University of Lisbon. The Gilchrists arrived in Angola in 1930 where there was one doctor for every 100,000 people, the average life expectancy was 30 years and where there was an infant mortality rate of 50% during the first year after birth.

The Gilchrists were stationed at Camundongo, Angola, from 1930 to 1940, a term interrupted by a two-year furlough in 1935 and 1936. Dr. Gilchrist established a leprosy clinic in Camundongo and spent a great deal of time walking or bicycling to out-patient clinics and to native villages to treat patients who were unable or unwilling to visit the clinics.

When World War II began, he obtained a leave of absence from the Mission Board, enlisted in the Royal Canadian Army Medical Corps, and was attached to the North Nova Scotia Regiment. He remained with the Regiment, first in Nova Scotia and then in England, until 1943, when he was transferred to a field ambulance section and sent to North Africa. In the Mediterranean Theatre, first in North Africa and then in Italy, Dr. Gilchrist was called on both to treat wounded troops in the front lines and to combat disease. With his experience in tropical medicine, he performed especially valuable service in helping to reduce the rate of malaria and dysentery among allied troops in Italy. Dr. Gilchrist was discharged with the rank of Major in May, 1945. Two months later, in recognition of his wartime service, he was made a Member of the Order of the British Empire.

In 1947, the Gilchrists returned to Angola, this time to Dondi. Medical facilities here were more complete than those at Camundongo and, in addition to a well-equipped hospital, there were two schools; but the shortage of doctors at Dondi was just as acute. Dr. Gilchrist was faced with the task of running the hospital, the leper clinics, the village sanitation programs and the medical assistants' training program by himself.

Dr. Gilchrist's next mission station was at Bailundo, where he headed a mission to concentrate on preventive medicine. Within two years of his arrival, a new health-care centre and a maternity centre had been built. Further, he established an extensive system that served more than seventy villages with tuberculosis clinics, malaria surveys, maternity conferences, and training courses for midwives and medical assistants. The emphasis was always on prevention and Dr. Gilchrist distributed an enormous amount of health-care literature.

By the early 1960s, the Gilchrists had come to consider Angola their home. His writings show a deep love for all things African. He was a student of the customs and languages of many African peoples, spoke fluent Portuguese and Umbundu, and he developed a deep appreciation for the African landscape and all the creatures that lived on it.

Due to violence between the government and rebels, the Gilchrists moved to Zambia in 1966 and then moved on to North America before returning to Kimpese in 1968. They then travelled to North America on furlough.

== Death and legacy ==
Dr. Gilchrist died with his wife and daughter on June 14, 1970, in an automobile accident near Red Deer, Alberta. The couple had nine children, three of whom died in infancy and are buried in Africa. Their daughter Betty, a missionary like her parents, died with them in the automobile accident. The couple were survived by their sons Tom, David, Ken, Ian and Rae.

Sidney Gilchrist's desire to help educate Angolan students in medicine was realized after his death, in the foundation of the Angola Memorial Scholarship Fund This has contributed to the educational needs of Angolan students, whether within Angola, enrolled in foreign universities, or in refugee camp schools in Namibia during the Angolan Civil War, for the past thirty-five years.

== Publications ==
- Seven Years of Leper Work in Angola, 1938
- Angola Awake, 1968
