= John Gilchrist (cricketer) =

English cricketer

Personal information
- Born: 24 April 1932 (age 94); South Shields, County Durham, England
- Source: ESPNcricinfo, 28 March 2016

John Gilchrist (born 24 April 1932) is an English former cricketer. He played four first-class matches for Bengal between 1957 and 1958.

== See also ==
- List of Bengal cricketers
