= Alexander Gilchrist =

British writer (1828–1861)

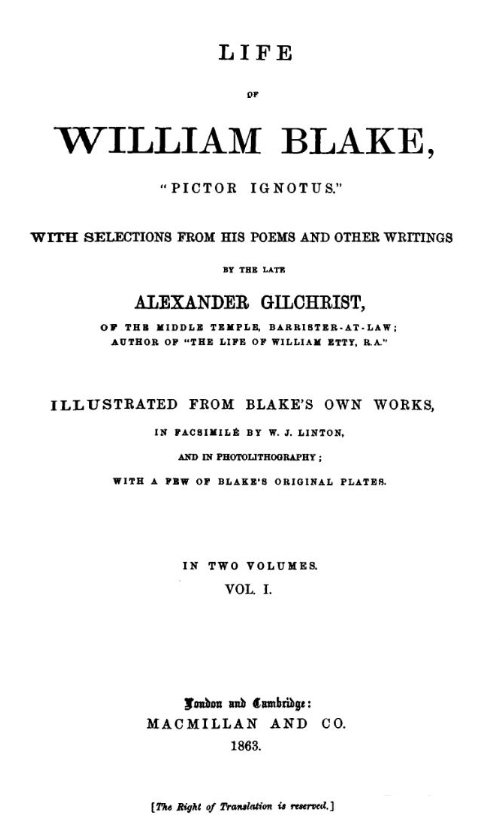
Gilchrist: "Life of William Blake" 1863, title page.

Alexander Gilchrist (1828 – 30 November 1861), an English author, is known mainly as a biographer of William Etty and of William Blake. Gilchrist's biography of Blake is still a standard reference work about the poet.

Gilchrist was born at Newington Green, then just to the north of London, son of the minister of the Unitarian church there. Although he studied law, Gilchrist adopted literary and art criticism as his main pursuits. He settled at Guildford during 1853, where he wrote Life of William Etty, R.A.. In 1856 he became a next-door neighbour of his friend Thomas Carlyle at Chelsea and his wife Jane Welsh Carlyle, both of them notable writers. Gilchrist had all but finished his Life of William Blake when he contracted scarlet fever from one of his children and died.

His wife Anne helped to complete the Life (his magnum opus), and survived him by 24 years. Dante Gabriel Rossetti and his brother William also contributed to the completion of the book.
