= Little Mikey =

Advertising character

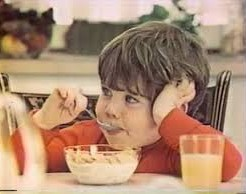
Little Mikey in the original 1972 Life cereal ad

Little Mikey is a fictional boy played by John Gilchrist (born 1968) in an American television commercial promoting Quaker Oats' breakfast cereal Life. The ad was created by art director Bob Gage, who also directed the commercial. It first aired in 1972. The popular ad campaign featuring Mikey remained in regular rotation for more than 12 years and was one of the longest continuously running commercial campaigns.

== Original commercial ==
The commercial centers on three young brothers eating breakfast. Before them sits a heaping bowl of Life breakfast cereal. Two of the brothers question each other about the cereal, prodding each other to try it and noting that it is supposed to be healthy. Neither boy has any desire to taste it ("I'm not gonna try it—you try it!"), so they get their younger brother Mikey (i.e. real name John) to do so ("Let's get Mikey"), noting that "he hates everything". Mikey briefly contemplates the bowl and after tasting the cereal, begins to eat it vigorously as the brothers exclaim, "He likes it! Hey Mikey!" Mikey's brothers were played by John's actual brothers, Michael (on the left in the spot) and Tommy. John is the middle child of seven children born to Tom and Pat Gilchrist of the Bronx..

== Reception ==
The commercial was very popular and won a Clio Award in 1974. It has often been included in retrospectives of classic television ads. In 1999, TV Guide ranked it the No. 10 commercial of all time. Despite its age, a 1999 survey found that 70% of adults could identify the spot based on just a "brief generic description."

== Sequels ==
A series of "Today's Mikey" ads aired in the 1980s, with Gilchrist bemusedly reprising the character as a college student.

In 1996, Quaker Oats commissioned director Rick Schulze, of Industrial Light & Magic Commercial Productions, to digitally composite a bottle of Snapple, then a subsidiary of Quaker Oats, into the original Life ad, via longtime Snapple ad agency Kirshenbaum Bond & Partners, New York. This time, however, in an ironic twist, Mikey likes some of the product's flavors while disliking the others.

Life's ad agency, Foote, Cone & Belding, in Chicago, revived the Mikey character for two campaigns in the late 1990s. In 1997, Quaker Oats initiated a nationwide search for the "next Mikey", settling on 4-year-old Marli Hughes out of more than 35,000 applicants. She also appeared in a TV commercial, "Better Life" directed by Howard Rose, where she is seen telling her classmates how she won the contest and traveled to New York to do some TV shows. She adds that as the new Mikey she gets to eat as much Life cereal as she wants.

In 1999, Quaker Oats remade the commercial word for word with an all-adult cast acting like kids. Mikey is portrayed by New York-based actor Jimmy Starace.

In 2024, Mikey was brought back in a commercial titled "Mikey's Morning". Played by Hudson Uebelhardt, he sings about his chaotic morning, which is made sweeter with a bowl of Life.

== Afterward ==
For many years, Mikey was the subject of an urban legend that purported that he had died after consuming Pop Rocks and Coke, supposedly causing a fatal stomach rupture. In fact, the actor who played Mikey, John Gilchrist, is still alive as of March 2026. Snopes later reported that the combination of Pop Rocks and Coke would do little more than produce a "hearty belch".

According to Gilchrist, the legend became so widespread that his own mother received a phone call from another woman to offer condolences for the death of her son, to which Mrs. Gilchrist replied, "He just came home from school!"

In 2011, Gilchrist became the director of media sales for MSG Network. He has said that he has no clear memories of filming the original commercial since he was only three and a half years old.
