= Tennessee Gazette and Mero-District Advertiser =

Newspaper (1797–1807)

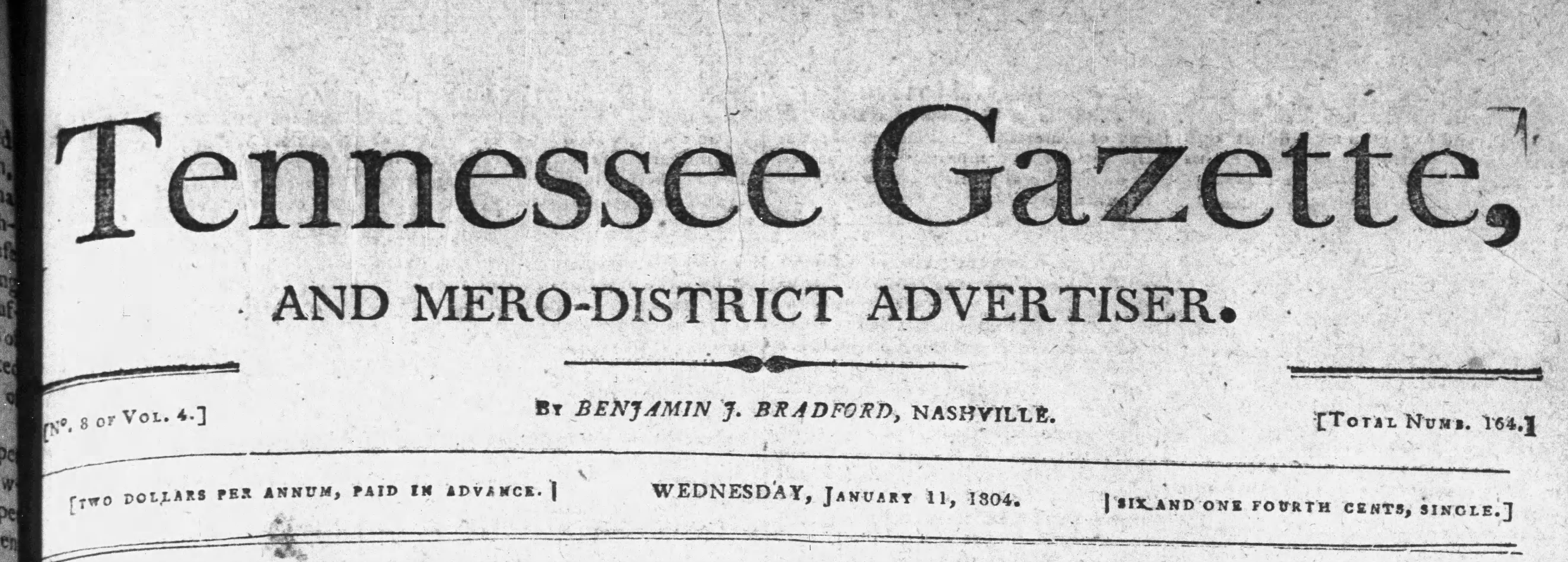
Tennessee Gazette's masthead, 1804

The Tennessee Gazette and Mero-District Advertiser was the first newspaper in Nashville, Tennessee, United States, founded in 1797. The first publisher was a man named Henkle from Kentucky. The paper was sold in 1798 to Benjamin Bradford, and its name changed to the Clarion. The owner in 1801 was Thomas Bradford, a cousin of Benjamin. It was a four-page weekly that persisted until 1807.
