= The Gorgeous Hussy =

1936 film by Clarence Brown

- Original film poster
- Directed by: Clarence Brown
- Written by: Stephen Morehouse Avery; Ainsworth Morgan
- Based on: The Gorgeous Hussy; 1934 novel by Samuel Hopkins Adams
- Produced by: Joseph L. Mankiewicz
- Starring: Joan Crawford; Robert Taylor; Lionel Barrymore; Franchot Tone; Melvyn Douglas; James Stewart
- Cinematography: George J. Folsey
- Edited by: Blanche Sewell
- Music by: Herbert Stothart
- Distributed by: Metro-Goldwyn-Mayer
- Release date: August 27, 1936
- Running time: 103 minutes
- Country: United States
- Language: English
- Budget: $1,119,000
- Box office: $2,019,000

The Gorgeous Hussy is a 1936 American period film directed by Clarence Brown, and starring Joan Crawford and Robert Taylor. The screenplay was written by Stephen Morehouse Avery and Ainsworth Morgan, which was based on a 1934 novel by Samuel Hopkins Adams. The supporting cast includes Lionel Barrymore, Franchot Tone, Melvyn Douglas and James Stewart.

The film's plot tells a fictionalized account of President of the United States Andrew Jackson and an innkeeper's daughter, Peggy O'Neal. In history, Peggy Eaton, also known as Peggy O'Neill, had a central role in the Petticoat affair that disrupted the cabinet of Andrew Jackson.

== Plot ==
In 1823 Washington D.C., Major O'Neal and his daughter Margaret "Peggy" O'Neal run an inn that is frequented by politicians. Peggy is outspoken for a woman of her time, and when Tennessee senator Andrew Jackson visits, she affectionately refers to him as "Uncle Andy".

Peggy is secretly in love with the well-known Virginia senator John Randolph, but her feelings are seemingly unrequited. When new inn resident "Beau" Timberlake refers to Peggy as a "tavern girl" while drinking, John slaps him in defense of Peggy. Beau soon falls in love with Peggy himself and proposes, but she refuses, because her affections are reserved for John. John spurns her advances, thinking that she is too young and does not really mean it, but begins to have a change of heart. When he finally realizes that they are both in love, however, he learns from Beau that Peggy has finally consented to marry him. Peggy again talks to John about their future, but John again rejects her, thinking that the younger Beau would be a more suitable husband.

On the night of their marriage, "Uncle Andy" hears a commotion in their room, and can't believe that Beau and Peggy are married. Instead of reading their marriage license, Beau shows Peggy his orders. He must leave for a three-month tour of duty aboard the USS Constitution the next day. However, when Constitution returns to Washington, Peggy learns that Beau has died when his men lost track of him.

In 1828, John returns from being the minister to Russia. Peggy is excited to see him, and he tells her how unhappy he was so far from Washington. At the same time, Jackson is elected U.S. president amid a campaign of verbal attacks aimed at his wife Rachel, whom he inadvertently married before her divorce from her first husband was final. Soon after the election, Rachel dies after asking Peggy to look after Jackson. Having been close to Jackson since the beginning, Peggy becomes his official hostess and confidante. Fulfilling Rachel's premonition, this causes many of the Washington political wives to gossip and snub her. At the same time, Jackson comes under political fire from Southerners, such as John Randolph, who feels he has turned against them by his stand on state rights.

At a ball, Peggy's childhood friend, "Rowdy" Dow, wants to fight Southern senator John C. Calhoun because of an insulting remark about Peggy, however, she interrupts and asks him to dance instead. Seeing Rowdy and Peggy dancing, John returns home, but is followed by Peggy, who once again professes her love. This time, John admits his own love and they plan to marry. Soon after telling Jackson what has happened, however, Peggy realizes that differing political views will never allow her and John to be happy, and they part.

A short time later, Secretary of War John Eaton, who has loved Peggy for years, proposes. She is fond of him, and believes, like Jackson, that marriage will bring her respectability. A year later, Rowdy comes to visit and tells Peggy that John Randolph has been shot and is near death. She asks Rowdy to take her to see her John, who was shot by Sunderland, a Southerner trying to prevent him from revealing to Jackson a proposed violent rebellion. John dies contentedly after Peggy's visit. On the way back to Washington, Peggy and Rowdy's coach is accosted by Sunderland, who demands safe passage to Washington in exchange for not revealing that he has seen them. Rowdy throws him out, but soon Jackson's cabinet members and their wives come to him to demand that Peggy be sent away from Washington. When Peggy arrives at the meeting, Jackson lies by saying she was sent to see John Randolph by him and that Rowdy was asked by John Eaton to accompany her. Jackson then demands the resignation of his entire cabinet, except for Eaton.

Finally, Peggy, who knows that even Jackson's kind lie will not lead to her acceptance in Washington, asks him to send John Eaton as the special envoy to Spain where she knows that they will find contentment.

== Cast ==
- Joan Crawford – Margaret "Peggy" O'Neal
- Robert Taylor – 'Bow' Timberlake
- Lionel Barrymore – Andrew Jackson
- Franchot Tone – John Eaton
- Melvyn Douglas – John Randolph of Roanoke
- James Stewart – 'Rowdy' Dow
- Alison Skipworth – Mrs. Beall
- Beulah Bondi – Rachel Jackson
- Louis Calhern – Sunderland
- Melville Cooper – Cuthbert
- Sidney Toler – Daniel Webster
- Gene Lockhart – Major O'Neal
- Clara Blandick – Louisa Abbott
- Frank Conroy – John C. Calhoun
- Nydia Westman – Maybelle
- Willard Robertson – Samuel D. Ingham
- Charles Trowbridge – Martin Van Buren
- Rubye De Remer – Mrs. Bellamy
- Betty Blythe – Mrs. Wainwright
- Zeffie Tilbury – Mrs. Daniel Beall

== Release ==
The Gorgeous Hussy had its premiere at Loew's Palace Theatre in Washington, D.C. on August 27, 1936, attended by descendants of Andrew Jackson and John Randolph.

== Reception ==
Howard Barnes in the New York Herald Tribune noted "In the title role Joan Crawford is handsome, although century-old costumes do not go well with the pronounced modernity of her personality. She makes of Peggy Eaton a straightforward and zealous figure.... [A] show that is rich with trappings and accented by moments of moving intensity."

However, writing in The New York Times, film critic Frank Nugent thought there was "not enough hussy" in the performance, and wrote "Miss Crawford's Peggy is a maligned Anne of Green Gables, a persecuted Pollyanna, a dismayed Dolly Dimple."

Beulah Bondi was nominated for an Oscar in the best supporting category and George Folsey received a nomination for cinematography.

== Box office ==
The Gorgeous Hussy was one of Crawford's higher grossing pictures during her years at MGM. At a cost of $1,119,000, it was the highest budgeted film she had made up to that time. The film grossed a total $2,019,000: $1,458,000 from the U.S. and Canada and $561,000 in other markets. It made a profit of $116,000.
