= Emily Donelson =

First Lady of the United States from 1829 to 1834

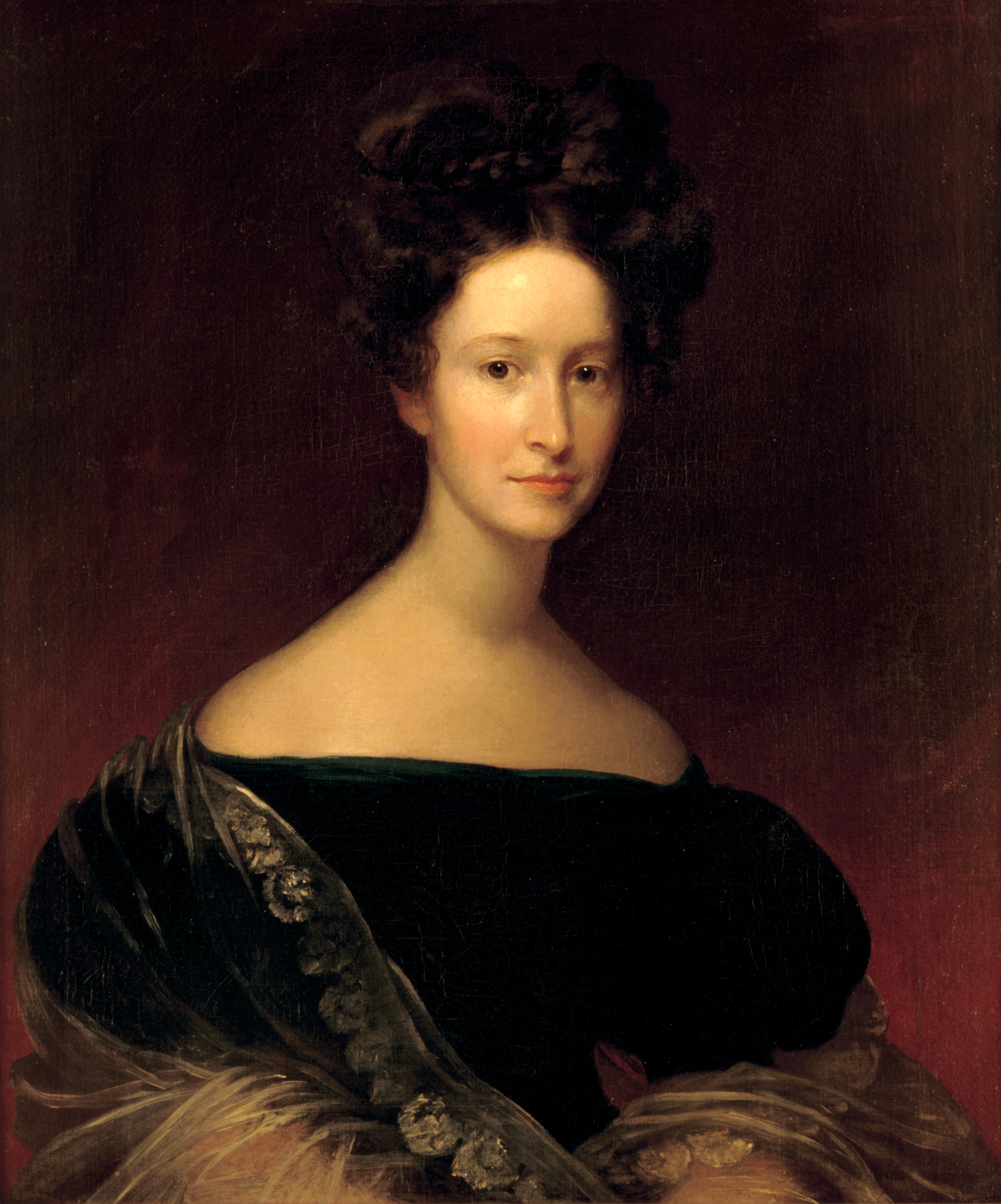
- Portrait by Ralph Eleaser Whiteside Earl

First Lady of the United States
- Acting
- In office March 4, 1829 – November 26, 1834
- President: Andrew Jackson
- Preceded by: Louisa Adams
- Succeeded by: Sarah Jackson (acting)

Personal details
- Born: June 1, 1807 Donelson, Tennessee, U.S.
- Died: December 19, 1836 (aged 29) Nashville, Tennessee, U.S.
- Cause of death: Tuberculosis
- Spouse: Andrew Jackson Donelson (m. 1824)
- Children: 4
- Relatives: Rachel Jackson (paternal aunt); Daniel Smith Donelson (paternal first cousin)
- Education: Nashville Female Academy

Emily Tennessee Donelson (June 1, 1807 – December 19, 1836) was the acting first lady of the United States from 1829 to 1834 during the presidency of her uncle Andrew Jackson. She was the daughter of the brother of Jackson's wife, Rachel Donelson Jackson, who died weeks before her husband's presidential inauguration.

Donelson grew up among the Donelson and Jackson families in Tennessee, marrying her first cousin Andrew Jackson Donelson. The Donelsons worked for their uncle as his career in politics progressed and he attained the presidency. They moved into the White House with President Jackson, where Donelson served as the White House hostess. She was successful in the role despite her lack of formal training in etiquette, and she was well received by Washington society. The Petticoat affair caused a split between the Donelsons and the president, and Donelson returned home for much of 1830 and 1831. She eventually returned to the White House, but she grew sick, returning home and dying of tuberculosis at the age of 29. Donelson was the first First Lady born after the Declaration of Independence and the first born in the 19th century.

== Early life (1807–1828) ==
=== Childhood ===
Emily Tennessee Donelson was born on June 1, 1807, in Donelson, Tennessee, as the 13th child of Mary Purnell (1763–1848) and John Donelson (1755–1830), the brother of Rachel Donelson Jackson, the wife of future President Andrew Jackson. As a child, she attended a log house school in Nashville. While she was a young girl, she was close to her first cousin and future husband Andrew Jackson Donelson, and he developed a romantic interest in her in 1816 while he escorted her home from school.

Donelson's early life was spent in rural Tennessee, and she had little exposure to politics or urban social life. Her childhood was instead defined by the military events of the 1810s. The men in her family fought in the War of 1812, and her uncle Andrew Jackson became a prominent general. At the age of eight when the Battle of New Orleans took place, she was aware of the danger her family was placed in by the war. Donelson began attending the Nashville Female Academy at the age of 13. Here she received an education above that of most American women at the time. She was eventually pulled out of the school because of her poor health and spent her time living at the Hermitage with her aunt.

=== Marriage and family ===
Donelson received many suitors as she grew into adulthood, including men such as Sam Houston. She began a courtship with Andrew Donelson as he began his law practice, and they soon became engaged. They chose to marry early to avoid long periods of separation, as Jackson had enlisted the prospective groom to be his personal secretary in Washington, D.C. Planning of the wedding was complicated by a period of illness for Donelson in early 1824 and her parents' reluctance to see her marry at such a young age. The couple was wed in a Presbyterian ceremony at the Hermitage on September 16, 1824. Emily was 17 years old, and Andrew was 25. Festivities were canceled after it was learned that her brother's wife had died that morning.

Donelson was close to her aunt and uncle, Rachel and Andrew Jackson, who considered her a daughter of their own. The couple had four children: Andrew Jackson Donelson Jr. (1826–1859), Mary Emily Donelson (1829–1905), John Samuel Donelson (1832–1863), and Rachel Jackson Donelson (1834–1888). Three of their children were born while the Donelsons lived at the White House, and all four had present or future presidents as godfathers; President Jackson was the godfather of their sons, while Martin Van Buren and James K. Polk were the respective godfathers of their two daughters.

The Donelsons accompanied Jackson to Washington, D.C., two weeks after the wedding, as Jackson was a candidate in the 1824 presidential election. Donelson immersed herself in the city's fashion and culture, making connections with other women in the city. Among the closest of her new friends was the wife of Delaware Senator Louis McLane. She was well received by the community and compared favorably to her aunt, who had been the victim of a mudslinging campaign against her husband. Upon returning home to Tennessee in early 1825, the Donelsons began their married life in a home of their own. While her husband managed the crops, Donelson began a garden to grow geraniums and lagerstroemia.

Donelson traveled to Florence, Alabama, in October 1828 with her son to visit her sister. When she returned to Tennessee the following month, it was known that Jackson had won the 1828 presidential election. Jackson's wife asked Donelson to go to the White House and fulfill the social role of first lady of the United States.

== White House hostess (1828–1834) ==
=== Role as hostess ===
Jackson's wife died shortly before his inauguration, and Donelson was made responsible for hosting social events after Jackson became president. She moved to the White House at the age of 21 with her husband, who served as Jackson's presidential aide. Jackson chose not to attend his inaugural ball due to his wife's death, and the Donelsons attended in his stead. During their first days in the White House, the president was grief-stricken by the loss of his wife, and Donelson found herself caring for him. Donelson was bothered by the lack of privacy afforded by the White House, as visitors were able to travel freely through the building, and her bedroom was visible from the central corridor. The president ultimately had partitions installed to block off the private residence.

Donelson was well received in her social role. Though she was not as well traveled or well educated as would have been expected of a White House hostess, her age was considered a valid excuse. Her inexperience in social custom was sometimes noted, but she was celebrated for her kindness as a hostess and her proficiency in dance. She was, however, well equipped to manage a large household, as she had done so regularly at home. She was also praised for the food and alcohol she had served during her tenure. Despite her lack of experience, the president trusted her judgement regarding etiquette at the White House, allowing her to make decisions in such matters.

=== Petticoat affair ===
Donelson's relationship with the president was permanently affected by the Petticoat affair in his first term. Washington socialite Peggy Eaton was the subject of scandal when it was rumored that she had previously been the mistress of her husband. Donelson was one of the many prominent individuals in the president's confidence that wished for him to distance himself from the Eatons. Donelson tolerated Eaton at White House events, but she refused to call upon her at her home—a considerable snub at the time. Whom Donelson chose to associate with was especially important, given the role that she played in social affairs.

The Eatons wrote to Donelson at the onset of the dispute to learn what she knew of the situation and encourage her to ignore the gossip, but Donelson stood against them and her husband followed her lead. The feud became more personal during a boat ride in July 1829, when Donelson, suffering from pregnancy sickness, chose to fall rather than be assisted by Eaton. It was also made worse when the president asked Donelson to visit Eaton and invite her to her child's christening. Secretary of State Martin van Buren, a close confidant of the president, sought a personal meeting with Donelson to resolve the issue, but his intervention did little to alleviate the conflict. Donelson explained to him that she did not have a moral dispute with Eaton, but that she found Eaton to be an unpleasant character.

Jackson and the family returned to the Hermitage after the adjournment of Congress in 1830. Donelson reunited with her recently widowed mother to grieve for her father. Donelson's family sided with her in the Petticoat affair, prompting a further rift with the president, who believed that they were plotting against him politically. By then the rift between the president and Donelson had grown so great that she refused to stay at the Hermitage, instead choosing to stay at her mother's house. When Jackson returned to Washington, Donelson's husband accompanied him, but Donelson did not. It is unknown whether Donelson was asked to leave by the president or if she left of her own accord. Mary Ann Lewis, one of Eaton's defenders, served as White House hostess in Donelson's stead.

=== Return to the White House ===
Donelson spent the following months raising her children while her husband was away. Both Donelson and Jackson wished for her return to the White House, but Donelson refused to accept Jackson's requirement of social acceptance for Eaton. Jackson conceded in early 1831, allowing Donelson to return unconditionally. Donelson's husband returned home in March and preparations to return to Washington began in April, but they were interrupted when Jackson changed his position. Neither of the Donelsons were to return unless they relented in the dispute against the Eatons. Donelson's husband returned on his own, discovering that Eaton and most of the other cabinet members had resigned.

Donelson returned to the White House, arriving in Washington on September 5. In November, Jackson's son married Sarah Yorke. There was uncertainty as to whether she would take over Donelson's role, but the president decided that Yorke would be hostess at the Hermitage while Donelson would retain her position at the White House, as Jackson needed Donelson's husband to stay in Washington.

Donelson's health began to decline after the birth of her son John in May 1832, and she chose to stay in Washington rather than risk a journey to Tennessee with the president in July. She similarly stayed in the White House while her husband and the president traveled through the Northeastern United States the following summer, though she and her children accompanied the president to the Rip Raps that August. Donelson had her fourth child on April 9, 1834, and her health grew worse. Due to her sickness, Donelson effectively stopped serving as White House hostess in 1834, and Sarah Yorke Jackson took over her responsibilities at the White House.

== Illness and death (1834–1836) ==
Donelson's health declined further in spring of 1836, and it was decided that she would leave Washington and return to Tennessee. She arrived in Tennessee in June 1836, where she went to recuperate at Poplar Grove (later named Tulip Grove), her plantation adjacent to the Hermitage. The plantation had recently been renovated, and after arriving she oversaw the placement of furniture. She overexerted herself and suffered from a pulmonary hemorrhage, revealing that she was suffering from tuberculosis. Plans for her to return to Washington were canceled.

That fall, it appeared that she was beginning to recover. Her husband left to return to the White House in October to resume his duties for two months while relatives cared for her. Many of the nation's most prominent figures regularly asked about her health, including Senator James Buchanan, Chief Justice Roger B. Taney, Secretary of State John Forsyth, Secretary of the Navy Levi Woodbury, and Postmaster General Amos Kendall. Donelson's recovery halted in December as she again became severely ill. On December 16, she resigned herself to the fact that she was soon going to die. She said her farewell to her children, and she asked to be propped up so she could watch for her husband out the window, hoping for his return from Washington. Donelson died on December 19, 1836, at the age of 29. Her husband arrived home two days later.

== Legacy ==
Donelson became the first in a long line of young acting first ladies in the mid-19th century. She did not meaningfully change the position of White House hostess. A multivolume biography of her life was written by Pamela Wilcox Burke and published as Emily Donelson of Tennessee in 1941. Donelson's daughter Mary would claim that she was the first baby to be born in the White House, though a grandson of Thomas Jefferson already held the title.

Donelson played a major role in the Petticoat affair. Socially, she was one of the most powerful women in the country, and her decision to stand against Eaton was one of consequence. The resulting political and social disputes in Washington created a division that may have directly influenced the Second Party System, which would dominate American politics in the decades leading up to the American Civil War.

In the 1982 Siena College Research Institute survey asking historians to assess American first ladies, Donelson and several other "acting" first ladies were included. The first ladies survey, which has been conducted periodically since, ranks first ladies according to a cumulative score on the independent criteria of their background, value to the country, intelligence, courage, accomplishments, integrity, leadership, being their own women, public image, and value to the president. In the 1982 survey, out of 42 first ladies and acting first ladies, Donelson was assessed as the 26th most highly regarded among historians. Acting first ladies such as Donelson have been excluded from subsequent iterations of this survey.

== See also ==
- Bibliography of United States presidential spouses and first ladies

Honorary titles
Preceded by Louisa Adams	First Lady of the United States; Acting; 1829–1834	Succeeded by Sarah Jackson
