= John Eaton (politician) =

American politician and diplomat (1790–1856)

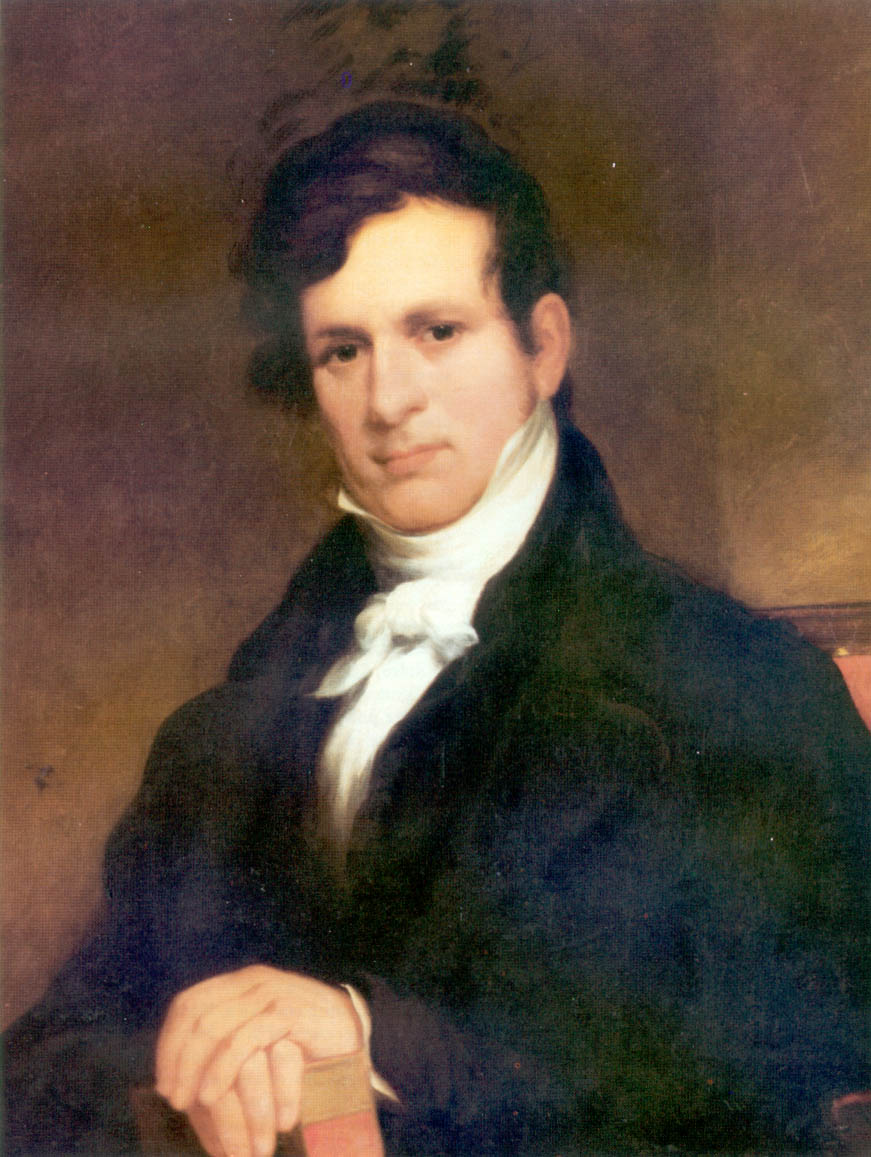

9th United States Minister to Spain
- In office March 16, 1836 – May 1, 1840
- President: Andrew Jackson; Martin Van Buren
- Preceded by: Cornelius P. Van Ness
- Succeeded by: Washington Irving

Governor of Florida Territory
- In office April 24, 1834 – March 16, 1836
- President: Andrew Jackson
- Preceded by: William Pope Duval
- Succeeded by: Richard K. Call

13th United States Secretary of War
- In office March 9, 1829 – June 18, 1831
- President: Andrew Jackson
- Preceded by: Peter Buell Porter
- Succeeded by: Roger B. Taney (acting); Lewis Cass

United States Senator from Tennessee
- In office November 16, 1818 – March 9, 1829
- Preceded by: George W. Campbell
- Succeeded by: Felix Grundy

Member of the Tennessee House of Representatives
- In office 1815–1816

Personal details
- Born: John Henry Eaton; June 18, 1790 Scotland Neck, North Carolina, U.S.
- Died: November 17, 1856 (aged 66) Washington, D.C., U.S.
- Resting place: Oak Hill Cemetery; Washington, D.C., U.S.
- Party: Democratic-Republican (before 1828); Democratic (1828–1840); Whig (1840–1856)
- Spouses: Myra Lewis (m. 1813; died 1815) Peggy O'Neill (m. 1829)
- Education: University of North Carolina, Chapel Hill

Military service
- Allegiance: United States
- Branch/service: Tennessee Militia
- Rank: Major
- Battles/wars: Creek War; War of 1812

John Henry Eaton (June 18, 1790 – November 17, 1856) was an American politician and ambassador from Tennessee who served as U.S. Senator and as U.S. Secretary of War in the administration of Andrew Jackson. He was 28 years, 4 months, and 29 days old when he entered the Senate, making him the youngest U.S. Senator in history.

Eaton was a lawyer in Tennessee who became part of a network that supported the political campaigns of Andrew Jackson. He also served in the militia as a major, and during the War of 1812 became an aide to Jackson; Eaton served with Jackson in all his wartime campaigns and battles, including the Battle of New Orleans. After serving in the Tennessee House of Representatives in 1815 and 1816, in 1818 Eaton was elected to the U.S. Senate, though he had not yet reached the constitutionally mandated age of 30.

Following Jackson's election to the presidency in 1828, Eaton resigned his Senate seat to join Jackson's cabinet as Secretary of War. Eaton and his wife Peggy became the focus of controversy during Jackson's first term; in the so-called Petticoat affair, Washington's society wives refused to socialize with the Eatons. The wives of the vice president, cabinet members, and members of Congress looked down on Peggy because of the circumstances of her marriage to Eaton; they had wed shortly after the death of her first husband, without waiting for the usual mourning period, giving rise to rumors that she had been unfaithful to her first husband before his death. Eaton resigned as Secretary of War as part of a strategy to resolve the controversy; he later received appointments as Governor of Florida Territory and U.S. Minister to Spain.

Upon returning to the United States in 1840, Eaton refused to endorse incumbent Martin Van Buren for reelection to the presidency, angering Jackson. In retirement, Eaton resided in Washington. He died there in 1856, and was buried at Oak Hill Cemetery.

== Early life ==
John Eaton was born on June 18, 1790, near Scotland Neck, Halifax County, North Carolina to John and Elizabeth Eaton. The elder John Eaton was a furniture maker who served as county coroner and member of the North Carolina House of Representatives. Eaton's uncle, Major Pinketham Eaton (sometimes spelled Pinkerton), was a Continental Army officer who died in combat during the Revolutionary War. The first Eaton forebear in America was Andrew Eaton, a watchmaker from Godalming, Surrey born in 1678 who emigrated to North Carolina in 1699. Eaton's father owned a large amount of land in middle Tennessee, and the 1790 census lists him as the owner of 12 slaves. The younger Eaton attended the University of North Carolina at Chapel Hill from 1802 to 1804. He then studied law, attained admission to the bar, and moved to Franklin, Tennessee, where he established a law practice. He apparently became a slave owner, as in 1813 he placed a runaway slave ad seeking the recovery of a teenager named Abraham. Abraham had a stutter and had crossed the Cumberland River near Haysborough and was thought to have procured a free pass.

Eaton became active in the Tennessee militia, and attained the rank of major. He developed a close friendship with Andrew Jackson, and served as an aide to Jackson during the Creek War and the War of 1812. Eaton took part in all Jackson's major campaigns. He supported Jackson's controversial decision in November 1814 to attack Pensacola in Spanish Florida, claiming that Spain had put herself in a belligerent position by allowing its territory to be occupied by British soldiers. Eaton participated in the Battle of New Orleans. After the war, Jackson took command of the Southern U.S. Army District with his headquarters at his home, The Hermitage. Eaton served on his staff. Eaton later became a major proponent of Jackson's presidential candidacy. He also wrote the epitaph on Rachel Jackson's grave.

John Reid, another Jackson aide, began a biography of Jackson in 1816, but died after writing only four chapters. Eaton finished the book, which was published as The Life of Andrew Jackson in 1817. This book was revised and republished in 1824 and 1828 to coincide with Jackson's presidential campaigns. It became a major primary reference for future Jackson biographers.

== Senate career ==
From 1815 to 1816, Eaton was a member of the Tennessee House of Representatives. In 1818, he was elected to serve as a U.S. Senator from Tennessee, and he served until 1829. His age of 28 at the time of his entry to the Senate was notable; it violated the U.S. Constitution's requirement that all senators be at least 30 years old. Eaton's age of 28 makes him the youngest person known to have served in the Senate.

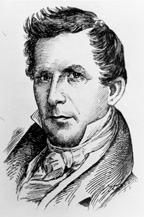
Eaton as a senator

Eaton was a slaveowner, but, unlike many Southerners, he supported the Missouri Compromise of 1820. On March 11, 1820, in a letter to Jackson, he claimed that "it has preserved piece and dissipated angry feelings, and dispelled appearances which seemed dark and horrible and threatening to the interest and harmony of the nation." He remained a close friend of Jackson, and while in the Senate supported the Jacksonian movement. He urged Jackson to accept an appointment as Governor of the newly acquired Florida Territory in 1821, which he did. From 1827 to 1829, Eaton served as Chairman of the Senate Committee on the District of Columbia.

In 1822, Eaton and his brother-in-law William Berkeley Lewis attempted to nominate a candidate before the Tennessee legislature to oppose incumbent U.S. Senator John Williams, who was openly against Jackson's candidacy for president in 1824 presidential election. After being unable to find a viable candidate, they nominated Jackson himself. The strategy was successful, and Jackson won. Eaton also helped advance Jackson's campaign for president through the Letters of Wyoming, which were printed in newspapers. In them, Eaton praised Jackson's record. He celebrated even some of Jackson's most controversial actions, such as the suspension of habeas corpus in New Orleans in 1815. "Washington would have done the same," he asserted. An anti-Jacksonian of Louisiana, Samuel Clement, wrote in 1827 that Eaton "by most impartial persons is considered as the General's mouth-piece, or amanuensis..."

In 1825, Eaton received an honorary degree (Master of Arts) from the University of North Carolina. Eaton supported the Tariff of 1828, or the "Tariff of Abominations."

== Marriages ==
In 1813, Eaton married his first wife, Myra Lewis (1788–1815), the daughter of William Terrell Lewis, a prominent Tennessee businessman and landowner. After the death of their father, Jackson became legal guardian to Myra and her sister Mary, and Eaton's marriage to Myra Lewis strengthened his relationship with Jackson.

Eaton married his second wife Peggy O'Neill Timberlake (1799–1879) in 1829, while serving in the Senate. She was the mother of three children; a son William, who died as an infant, and daughters Virginia and Margaret. Eaton had been a longtime friend of Peggy Timberlake and her husband John B. Timberlake, and John Timberlake had died only a few months before Eaton married his widow. Jackson knew and liked Peggy Eaton and encouraged Eaton to marry her, telling him "Why yes, Major. If you love the woman, and she will have you, marry her by all means." He asked Eaton to marry her as soon as possible. Eaton had no children with either wife.

== Secretary of War ==
=== Petticoat affair ===
Jackson, leading the new Democratic Party, won the 1828 presidential election, and in March 1829 Eaton resigned his Senate seat to accept appointment as Jackson's Secretary of War. The appointment was seemingly made because of Jackson's desire to have a personal friend in the Cabinet in whom he could confide.

Women in Washington social circles led by Floride Calhoun, the wife of Vice President John C. Calhoun, snubbed the Eatons because they married so soon after John Timberlake's death, rather than waiting for the usual mourning period; there were stories that Eaton and Peggy Timberlake had been having an affair before John Timberlake had died. Rumors held that Peggy, as a barmaid in her father's tavern, had been sexually promiscuous or had even been a prostitute. Petticoat politics emerged when the wives of cabinet members, led by Mrs. Calhoun, refused to socialize with the Eatons. They refused to attend social events at which she would be present. According to Emily Donelson, Eaton considered resigning in the first months of the administration.

Jackson refused to believe the rumors about Mrs. Eaton's past conduct, telling his Cabinet that "She is as chaste as a virgin!" In his view, the dishonorable people were the rumormongers, in part because he was reminded of the attacks that had been made, particularly in the 1828 election, against his wife over the circumstances of their marriage. Jackson also believed that John Calhoun fanned the flames of the controversy as a way to gain political leverage for a growing anti-Jackson coalition. Duff Green, a Calhoun protégé and editor of the United States Telegraph, accused Eaton of secretly working to have pro-Calhoun cabinet members Samuel D. Ingham (Treasury) and John Branch (Navy) removed from their positions.

Jackson biographers Richard B. Latner and Robert V. Remini believe that the hostility towards the Eatons was rooted less in questions of morality and proper behavior than in politics. Eaton had been in favor of the Tariff of Abominations, which Calhoun bitterly opposed and which led him to elucidate the doctrine of nullification. He was also close to Secretary of State Martin Van Buren, another supporter of the tariff and Calhoun's main rival for who would succeed Jackson as president. Calhoun may have wanted to expel Eaton from the cabinet as a way of boosting his anti-tariff agenda and increasing his standing in the Democratic Party. Several other cabinet members were from the South and may have shared similar views. Ingham, a close ally of Calhoun, also supported Calhoun's plans to become president.

Eaton took his revenge on Calhoun. In the spring of 1830, reports emerged accurately stating that Calhoun, while Secretary of War, had favored censuring Jackson for his 1818 invasion of Florida. These infuriated Jackson. The biggest bombshell was a letter given to Jackson on May 12 by William H. Crawford, Monroe's Secretary of the Treasury, in which Crawford stated that, contrary to Jackson's former suspicions, it was Calhoun, not himself, who vocally advocated censuring Jackson in Monroe's cabinet. For reasons unclear, Calhoun asked Eaton to approach Jackson about the possibility of Calhoun publishing his correspondence with Jackson at the time of the Seminole War. Eaton did nothing. This caused Calhoun to believe that Jackson had approved the publication of the letters. Calhoun published them in the Telegraph. This gave the appearance of Calhoun trying to justify himself against a conspiracy to damage him, and further enraged the President.

Meanwhile, Van Buren, a widower, took Jackson's side and defended the Eatons. This raised Van Buren in Jackson's esteem, and, in addition to disagreements between Jackson and Calhoun on a number of other issues, mainly the Nullification Crisis, marked him as Calhoun's likely vice presidential successor. In the spring of 1831, Van Buren helped end the Petticoat affair by offering to resign as Secretary of State. This gave Jackson the opportunity to reorganize his cabinet by asking for other resignations, and he was able to replace the anti-Eaton secretaries; only Postmaster General William T. Barry remained. Eaton, being the source of the controversy, also agreed to resign his position.

On June 17, the day before Eaton formally resigned, a text appeared in the Telegraph stating that it had been "proved" that the families of Ingham, Branch, and Attorney General John M. Berrien had refused to associate with Mr. Eaton. Eaton wrote to all three men demanding that they answer for the article. Ingham sent back a contemptuous letter stating that, while he was not the source for the article, the information was still true. On June 18, Eaton challenged Ingham to a duel through his second, his brother-in-law Dr. Philip G. Randolph, who visited Ingham twice and threatened him the second time with personal harm if he did not comply with Eaton's demands. Randolph was dismissed, and the next morning Ingham sent a note to Eaton discourteously declining the invitation. It described Eaton's situation as one of "pity and contempt." Eaton wrote a letter back to Ingham accusing him of cowardice. Ingham was then informed that Eaton, Randolph, and others were looking to assault him. He gathered together his own bodyguard, and was not immediately molested. However, he reported that for the next two nights Eaton and his men continued to lurk about his dwelling and threaten him. He then left the city, and returned safely to his home. Ingham communicated to Jackson his version of what took place, and Jackson then asked Eaton to answer for the charge. Eaton admitted that he "passed by" the place where Ingham had been staying, "but at no point attempted to enter...or besiege it."

In 1832, Jackson nominated Van Buren to be Minister to England. Calhoun killed the nomination with a tie-breaking vote against it, claiming his act would "...kill him, sir, kill dead. He will never kick, sir, never kick." However, Calhoun only made Van Buren seem the victim of petty politics, which were rooted largely in the Eaton controversy. Van Buren was nominated for vice president, and was elected as Jackson's running mate when Jackson won a second term in 1832. The affair had a hand in the replacement of the Telegraph as the main propaganda instrument for the administration. Jackson enlisted the help of longtime supporter Francis Preston Blair, who in November 1830 established a newspaper known as The Washington Globe, which from then on served as the mouthpiece of the Democratic Party. It also contributed to the creation of the Kitchen Cabinet, a network of informal advisors and aides to Jackson, in contrast to the official cabinet.

=== Indian affairs ===
In the summer of 1830, following the passage of the Indian Removal Act, allowing for the transportation of the "Five Civilized Tribes" from their homes in the South to lands being given to them in Indian Territory (modern-day Oklahoma), Jackson, Eaton, and General John Coffee negotiated with the Chickasaw, who quickly agreed to move west by agreeing to the Treaty of Franklin in August. Jackson put Eaton and Coffee in charge of negotiating with the Choctaw. They frequently bribed the chiefs in order to gain their submission. Their tactics typically worked, and the chiefs signed the Treaty of Dancing Rabbit Creek, agreeing to move west. The removal of the Choctaw took place in the winter of 1831 and 1832, and was wrought with misery and suffering.

=== Other activities ===
As Secretary of War, Eaton supported compensation upon discharge for soldiers who had served honorably. He made the Topographical Engineers a separate bureau within the War Department.

== Later career ==
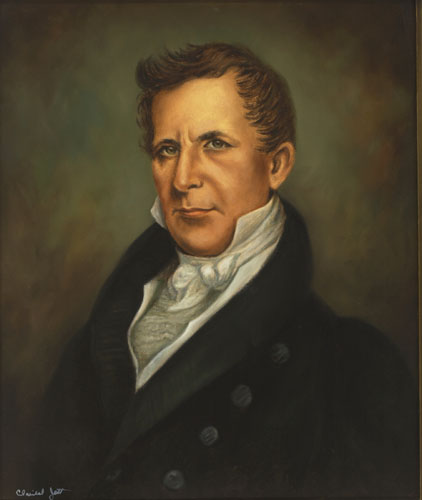
Eaton as governor of Florida

Following his resignation as Secretary of War, Eaton returned to Tennessee. His wife suffered a period of ill health after arriving. Jackson planned to replace him in the War Department with Tennessee senator Hugh Lawson White. This would vacate White's senate seat, which Eaton would presumably fill. However, White refused the cabinet position despite much prodding from Jackson. Eaton attempted to return to the Senate by running against incumbent Felix Grundy in 1832. Jackson officially remained neutral during the election, as Grundy was also a Democrat. Behind the scenes, however, Jackson, still resentful about the outcome of the Petticoat Affair, supported Eaton, whom he probably believed "would prove to be a safer man and more easily handled than Grundy." Historian Powell Moore wrote that in "a perusal of the correspondence relative to the contest, it is evident that Jackson was using every influence to elect Eaton," but Eaton was defeated. He served as a delegate to the 1832 Democratic National Convention. In a letter to Jackson before the convention, Eaton declared his strong support for Jackson's choice of Van Buren for vice president. He also requested that several of his friends be given appointments in the administration.

Eaton later received appointments that took him away from Washington, D.C. He served first as Governor of the Florida Territory from 1834 to 1836. In 1835, violence began to escalate between the Seminole Indians and white settlers. Members of the Seminole had signed Treaty of Payne's Landing in which they agreed to move westward. However, many began to resist. Eaton warned Jackson against an excessive show of military force, fearing that this would only provoke the Seminole further. Jackson heeded his advice at first, but continuing to do so proved impossible, as Seminole attacks continued. The violence eventually led to the Second Seminole War.

In 1836, Eaton was replaced as governor by Richard K. Call. Later that year, he was appointed Ambassador to Spain, and he served until April 1840. His tenure was undistinguished; a predecessor in the post, Cornelius P. Van Ness, strongly castigated Eaton, reporting that the Spanish government thought little of Eaton's abilities. He believed Eaton to be "not only incapable of putting together two common ideas but of comprehending a single one," and contended that Eaton's work habits could best be described as "indolent." He also indicated that Mrs. Eaton engaged in spreading gossip about Van Buren, and that her manner was forward enough that the Spanish government considered her to be the "real" minister. Finally, Van Ness accused the Eatons of drinking excessively, writing that "he and she regularly dispose of two bottles of rum of the strongest kind in the spirit of three days; this is, four glasses each and every day, besides wine: and while they are taking it and he chewing, she smokes her cigars."

== Retirement and death ==
Upon returning from Spain, Eaton announced that he was unwilling to support Van Buren's campaign for reelection to the presidency in 1840. He endorsed Van Buren's opponent, William Henry Harrison. Supposedly, this action was rooted in Eaton's displeasure over the way he was allegedly treated by Van Buren while serving as Ambassador to Spain. "My friend Maj. Eaton comes home not in good humor. He says he has been dismissed," Jackson wrote. The declaration deeply upset Jackson, who in a letter to Blair went so far as to accuse Eaton of having "apostatised and taken the field with the piebald opposition of abolitionists, antimasons and blue light federalists." Eaton officially joined the Whig Party, but for the remainder of his life was not politically active. He and Jackson encountered each other in 1840 while Jackson was travelling throughout Tennessee to campaign for Van Buren. According to Remini, "both men behaved properly." Jackson biographer James Parton wrote in 1860 that Eaton and Jackson remained unreconciled. However, 21st-century historian John F. Marszalek claims that the two men did reconcile with each other just before Jackson's death in 1845.

Eaton and his wife lived comfortably in retirement in Washington, D.C. He resumed his law practice, and he and his wife returned to Franklin during the summers. Eaton chose not to join any church, but figured prominently in Washington social circles. He was president of the Washington Bar Association. Eaton and his wife were once again reported to have drunk to excess, and he was criticized for taking up a legal case against Amos Kendall, a staunch Jacksonian who had defended the Eatons' conduct during the Petticoat affair. Eaton died in Washington on November 17, 1856, at age 66. His funeral was conducted at his residence. Eaton was buried at Oak Hill Cemetery in Washington.

== Legacy ==
Contemporary William Joseph Snelling, in his 1831 biography of Jackson, strongly criticizes Eaton. Of Eaton's Jackson biography, he writes, "it is hard to say which is more disgraced, the hero [Jackson] or the historian. The book contains scarcely a period of good English, but makes amends by abundance of fulsome adulation, by the omission of many disgraceful acts and the palliation of others." By 1831, Snelling says, he had become "the laughing-stock of the nation." Historian Benjamin Perley Poore called Eaton's biography "the recognized textbook for Democratic editors and stump speakers, and although entirely unreliable, it has formed the basis for the lives of General Jackson since published." Remini says that "the entire Eaton affair might be termed infamous. It ruined reputations and terminated friendships. And it was all so needless."

In spite of this, an obituary published in Washington's Daily National Intelligencer spoke favorably of Eaton. It noted that after his death Chief Justice Roger B. Taney, a Jackson appointee, had adjourned a session of the Supreme Court early in order that those present could attend the funeral.

Eaton's biography of Jackson has remained an important source for historians, particularly with regard to Jackson's military service. An edition of the work, edited by Frank Lawrence Owsley Jr., was published in 1974. Owsley's edition includes the original work, published in 1817, with later changes noted in the appendices. He says in the introduction that the original book is "by far the superior historical account," on account of the later editions being published for partisan purposes as campaign literature. According to Owsley, the later editions excised anything that could be seen as critical of Jackson, anything that gave credit to others over or with him, and any criticism of people that was seen as politically damaging, while adding praise for Jackson. Owsley attributes many of the unfavorable reviews of Eaton's work to people using the later editions and not realizing the extent to which they were revised from the original. He emphasizes the original text as an extremely valuable source for Jackson's military career.

Eaton County, Michigan, is named in Eaton's honor.

== See also ==
- List of federal political sex scandals in the United States
- List of youngest members of the United States Congress

== Bibliography ==
- Bates, Christopher G. (2015). The Early Republic and Antebellum America: An Encyclopedia of Social, Political, Cultural, and Economic History. Routledge. ISBN 9781317457404.
- Carey, Bill (2018). Runaways, Coffles and Fancy Girls: A History of Slavery in Tennessee. Nashville, Tennessee: Clearbrook Press. ISBN 978-0-9725680-4-3. LCCN 2018903570. OCLC 1045068878.
- Cheathem, Mark Renfred (2008). Jacksonian and Antebellum Age: People and Perspectives. Santa Barbara, CA: ABC-CLIO. ISBN 978-1-59884-017-9.
- Gannett, Henry (1905). The Origin of Certain Place Names in the United States. Washington, D.C.: Govt. Print. Off. p. 113.
- Howe, Daniel Walker (2007). What Hath God Wrought: the Transformation of America, 1815–1848. Oxford, New York: Oxford University Press. ISBN 978-01997-4379-7.
- James, Edward T. (1971). Notable American Women, 1607–1950: A Biographical Dictionary. Vol. 1. Cambridge, MA: Belknap Press. ISBN 978-0-674-62734-5.
- Latner, Richard B. (2002). "Andrew Jackson". In Graff, Henry (ed.). The Presidents: A Reference History (7th ed.).
- Marszalek, John F. (2000). The Petticoat Affair: Manners, Mutiny, and Sex in Andrew Jackson's White House. Baton Rouge: LSU Press. ISBN 0-8071-2634-9.
- Marszalek, John F. (December 25, 2009). "Biography, John Henry Eaton". Tennessee Encyclopedia of History and Culture. Nashville, TN: Tennessee Historical Society.
- McKellar, Kenneth (1942). Tennessee Senators as Seen by One of their Successors. Kingsport, TN: Southern Publishers, Inc.
- Meacham, Jon (2008). American Lion: Andrew Jackson in the White House. New York: Random House Publishing Group. ISBN 978-0-8129-7346-4.
- Moore, Powell (January 1932). "The Political Background of the Revolt Against Jackson in Tennessee". East Tennessee Historical Society's Publications. 28. Tennessee Historical Commission, University of Tennessee. Knoxville, Tennessee: East Tennessee Historical Society: 45–66. ISSN 0361-6193. OCLC 1137265. FHL 1640746.
- Parton, James (1860). Life of Andrew Jackson, Volume 3. New York, NY: Mason Brothers. p. 648.
- Poore, Benjamin Perley (1886). Perley's Reminiscences of Sixty Years in the National Metropolis. Philadelphia: Hubbard Brothers.
- Powell, William S. (1986). Dictionary of North Carolina Biography. Vol. 2. Chapel Hill, NC: University of North Carolina Press. ISBN 978-0-8078-1329-4.
- Ratner, Lorman A. (1997). Andrew Jackson and His Tennessee Lieutenants: A Study in Political Culture. Westport, CT: Greenwood Press. ISBN 978-0-313-29958-2.
- Reid, John; Eaton, John Henry (1974) [1817]. Owsley, Frank Lawrence (ed.). The Life of Andrew Jackson. Tuscaloosa, AL: University of Alabama Press. ISBN 0-8173-5164-7.
- Remini, Robert V. (1977). Andrew Jackson and the Course of American Empire, 1767–1821. New York: Harper & Row Publishers, Inc. ISBN 978-0-8018-5911-3.
- Remini, Robert V. (1981). Andrew Jackson and the Course of American Freedom, 1822–1832. New York: Harper & Row Publishers, Inc. ISBN 978-0-8018-5913-7.
- Remini, Robert V. (1984). Andrew Jackson and the Course of American Democracy, 1833–1845. New York: Harper & Row Publishers, Inc. ISBN 978-0-06-015279-6.
- Snelling, William Joseph (1831). A Brief and Impartial History of the Life and Actions of Andrew Jackson. Boston, MA: Stimpson & Clapp. p. 164.
- Stokes, Melvyn; Conway, Stephen (1996). The Market Revolution in America: Social, Political and Religious Expressions, 1800–1880. Charlottesville, VA: University Press of Virginia. ISBN 978-0-8139-1649-1.

U.S. Senate
Preceded by George W. Campbell	U.S. senator (Class 1) from Tennessee; 1818–1829; Served alongside: John Williams, Andrew Jackson, Hugh Lawson White	Succeeded by Felix Grundy
Political offices
Preceded by Peter Buell Porter	U.S. Secretary of War; Served under: Andrew Jackson; 1829–1831	Succeeded by Roger B. Taney; Acting
Preceded by William P. Duval	Territorial Governor of Florida; 1834–1836	Succeeded by Richard K. Call
Diplomatic posts
Preceded by Cornelius P. Van Ness	U.S. Minister to Spain; 1836–1840	Succeeded by Aaron Vail
