= Asa Bird Gardiner =

Soldier, attorney, and New York prosecutor

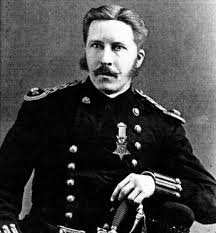
- Asa Bird Gardiner (circa 1873)
- Born: September 30, 1839; Manhattan, New York, U.S.
- Died: May 24, 1919 (aged 79); Suffern, New York, U.S.
- Burial place: Green-Wood Cemetery
- Military career
- Allegiance: United States of America; Union
- Branch: United States Army
- Service years: 1861–1888
- Rank: Major
- Conflicts: Carlisle, Pennsylvania
- Awards: Medal of Honor (Revoked)
- Other work: District Attorney of New York County (removed from office)

Asa Bird Gardiner (September 30, 1839 – May 24, 1919) was a controversial American soldier, attorney, and district attorney for New York County (a.k.a. the Borough of Manhattan) from 1898 to 1900.

He received the Medal of Honor for his service in the American Civil War in 1872, but it was rescinded in 1917 when supporting documentation was not found. As a Judge Advocate in the United States Army, he prosecuted the case of Johnson Chesnut Whittaker, a black cadet at West Point.

He was elected New York County District Attorney in 1897, but tried for corruption. Despite his acquittal, he was removed from office by Theodore Roosevelt in 1900. He refused to prosecute the corrupt Tammany Hall bosses of New York City, proclaiming "The hell with reform!" (or "Reform be damned!").

== Early years ==
Asa Bird Gardiner was born on September 30, 1839, in New York City. His birth name was Asa Bird Gardner – without the "i" which he added when he legally changed his name in 1884. He was born at Fraunces Tavern, where his father and uncle were innkeepers. His father later ran the Philadelphia Hotel.

He graduated with a A.B. from the College of the City of New York in 1859 and a LL.B. from New York University School of Law in 1860. He was admitted to the bar and began private practice as an attorney.

== Civil War service ==
Shortly after the outbreak of the American Civil War, Gardiner was commissioned as a first lieutenant in the 31st New York Infantry Regiment on May 27, 1861, and was mustered out of service on August 7, 1861. He was commissioned a captain in the 22nd National Guard Infantry (a.k.a. 22nd New York State Militia) on May 31, 1862, served in Baltimore, Maryland, and was honorably mustered out of service on September 5, 1862.

He was again commissioned a captain in the same regiment when it was reactivated on June 18, 1863, due to the movement of Lee's Army of Northern Virginia towards Pennsylvania. Gardiner saw action at Sporting Hill, Pennsylvania, on June 30 and at Carlisle on July 1, where he was wounded in action. Gardiner's wound was apparently minor, as there is no indication he suffered from a physical disability and he almost lived to the age of 80. Both actions were minor with the 22nd having no killed in action but it did have 9 and 12 soldiers wounded respectively on the 30th and the 1st.

Gardiner was mustered out of active service on July 24, 1863. On May 16, 1865, Gardiner was commissioned a first lieutenant in the Veteran Reserve Corps to rank from February 11, 1865, and served as adjutant of the 7th Veteran Reserve Corps Regiment until he was honorably mustered out of service on August 13, 1866. Gardiner received brevet promotion to captain on March 13, 1865, for "gallant and meritorious service during the war".

=== Medal of Honor ===
Gardiner received the Medal of Honor on September 23, 1872, for "distinguished service performed during the war while serving as Captain 22nd New York State Militia" during the Battle of Sporting Hill. Gardiner's award was rescinded in early 1917 after a review panel led by retired Lieutenant General Nelson A. Miles found there was no evidence to support Gardiner deserving the award. Although Gardiner's award was rescinded, he refused to return the medal.

== Post-Civil War military service ==
After the end of the Civil War, Gardiner was commissioned a second lieutenant of the 9th Infantry Regiment of the Regular Army, to rank from July 20, 1866, and was promoted to first lieutenant on February 14, 1868. He transferred to the 1st Artillery Regiment on April 3, 1869, and served for a time as aide-de-camp to Major General Irvin McDowell who was commander of the Department of the East with its headquarters on Governors Island in New York Harbor.

Gardiner was promoted to the rank of major on August 18, 1873 and served as a Judge Advocate for 15 years until he retired from the Army on December 8, 1888.

By an act of Congress, the United States Military Academy at West Point established a Department of Law in 1874, with a senior Judge Advocate as its first professor. Secretary of War William W. Belknap appointed Gardiner to the post, and he became the first lawyer to teach law at the Academy. Gardiner initiated the entire law curriculum, including study of the Lieber Code and a textbook he wrote. Gardiner served at West Point from July 20, 1874 to August 28, 1878.

=== Notable courts martial ===
While serving as a judge advocate, Gardiner was involved in several high-profile legal proceedings.

In 1875, while still at West Point, Gardiner was chosen by President Ulysses S. Grant to be the presiding judge advocate general at the Whiskey Ring court-martial of Brevet Brigadier General Orville E. Babcock, Grant's personal secretary. The civilian grand jury that had already convened refused to turn over its evidence, however, and the court-martial adjourned; Babcock was later acquitted.

In 1878, a commission reviewed the court-martial of Major General Fitz John Porter, who had been dismissed from the Army in 1863 for his actions at the battle of Second Bull Run. The commission chairman, General John M. Schofield, appointed Gardiner as recorder, but he "took upon himself the role of a judge advocate in a court-martial," contesting evidence favorable to Porter. The commission ultimately re-instated Porter. Gardiner’s unethical conduct on the board angered Schofield to the point that Schofield lodged an official complaint with the War Department and prepared court-martial charges against him.

In 1880, one of the first black cadets at West Point, Johnson Chesnut Whittaker, was assaulted by three fellow cadets, but administrators at the Academy said he had faked the attack. After a year of inquests and hearings including the attention of the United States Congress, Whittaker was court-martialed, with Gardiner as prosecutor, resulting in Whittaker's expulsion. The verdict was overturned in 1883 by President Arthur on the ground of faulty evidence, but the expulsion was immediately reinstated by the Secretary of War on the grounds that Whittaker had failed an exam. In 1995, acting on a request from Congress, President Clinton awarded Whittaker a posthumous commission as second lieutenant.

In 1884, Gardiner was selected for another high-profile prosecution, that of his superior, Brigadier General David G. Swaim, the Judge Advocate General of the Army. Swaim was convicted of financial improprieties and suspended from duty.

=== Later military career ===
On July 11, 1884, Gardiner legally changed the spelling of his last name from "Gardner" to "Gardiner". This was, according to a letter he wrote The New York Times, to conform to the spelling of the last name by his ancestors who lived in Rhode Island.

In 1887 Gardiner was appointed Acting Assistant Secretary of War and held the position until he retired from the Army on December 8, 1888, for "disability in the line of duty" at the age of 49. He was promoted to lieutenant colonel on the Army Retired List in 1904 in recognition of his service during the Civil War.

== New York politics ==
After his retirement from the Army, Gardiner pursued the private practice of law in New York City. He became active in the Tammany Hall political machine, the major faction of the New York City Democrats. A history of the society calls him a "simon-pure Democrat" who followed his father and grandfather's participation in the Tammany Society, where in 1901 he was elected a sachem.

Gardiner was allied with Tammany Hall boss Richard Croker and, in November 1897, was elected on the Democratic ticket as New York County District Attorney. During the campaign Gardiner said, "Reform be damned!" when confronted with calls to confront the corruption of Tammany Hall.

He took office on January 1, 1898, together with the first elected officers of the newly consolidated City of New York (which added the boroughs of Brooklyn, Queens and Staten Island to Manhattan and the Bronx). In September 1899, Gardiner appointed Columbia Law School alumnus James Dickson Carr to serve as the first African American assistant district attorney in New York state history.

In December 1900 formal charges were brought against Gardiner for "interfering with deputies of the Attorney General in presentation of election cases to the Grand Jury and the prosecution thereof". Governor Theodore Roosevelt removed Gardiner from office later that month after Gardiner chose not to contest the charges.

Among the beneficiaries of Gardiner's anti-reform attitude was saloonkeeper Frank J. Farrell, who is said to have opened three hundred pool halls (in reality fronts for bookmakers) after his friend took office, building a fortune that he would use to bring the New York Yankees to town in 1903.

In 1908 Gardiner was hired by the State of New York to represent the state in opposing the extradition of Harry K. Thaw to Pittsburgh, Pennsylvania, to testify in a bankruptcy case. Thaw had been judged insane in his trial for murdering architect Stanford White in 1906. Gardiner argued that, as Thaw had been adjudicated as insane, Thaw could not be called to testify in court. The state offered a fee to Gardiner of $2,000 but Gardiner presented the state with a bill for $15,000. Gardiner's rationalization of the high fee was that he had spent five months on the case while Thaw's mother spent $100,000 in legal fees.

On September 10, 1913, he was the orator at the centennial commemoration of the Battle of Lake Erie in Newport, Rhode Island. He wore the uniform of the Veteran Corps of Artillery and spoke in his capacity as the Commandant of the Military Society of the War of 1812. A contemporary newspaper article described Gardiner as "one of the ablest orators Newport has ever heard".

== Military and hereditary societies ==
Gardiner was active in several military and hereditary societies including the Society of the Cincinnati (Secretary General and President of the Rhode Island Society), the Military Order of the Loyal Legion of the United States (elected November 6, 1867, insignia number 586), the Grand Army of the Republic (member of James Monroe Post), the Sons of the Revolution (founding member in 1883, insignia number 83), the Military Society of the War of 1812 (vice president in 1890 and president in 1908), the Veteran Corps of Artillery (vice commandant with rank of lieutenant colonel in 1890 and commandant with rank of colonel in 1908) and the General Society of the War of 1812 (elected to membership in 1892).

Gardiner was commissioned a lieutenant colonel in the New York State Militia when he was elected vice commandant of the Veteran Corps of Artillery in 1890 and was promoted to colonel when he was elected commandant in 1908. Near the end of his life, he was brevetted to the rank of major general in the New York State Militia.

Gardiner was also a member of the Union Club, the Metropolitan Club and the Delta Kappa Epsilon fraternity.

== Society of the Cincinnati ==
In 1877 Gardiner joined the Rhode Island Society of Society of the Cincinnati, a military society founded by officers who had served in the American Revolution and perpetuated by their descendants. Gardiner was a key figure the re-establishment of the Rhode Island Society of the Cincinnati – which had been dormant since 1835. In 1878, Gardiner was elected as the Rhode Island Society's Assistant Secretary.

Gardiner joined the Society by right of his descent from his great uncle, Lieutenant Jonathan Willard (1744–1832). Although Lieutenant Willard was a veteran of the 1st New Hampshire Regiment, and the Society has a tradition of members joining the state Society which their ancestor was eligible to join, the Rhode Island Society had an exception in its membership requirements to admit members who were descendants of officers whose state did not have an active society. As New Hampshire did not have an active society in 1877, Gardiner was permitted to join the Rhode Island Society.

Gardiner was elected Secretary General of the National Society in 1884 and, in the same year, authored Precedents and Ordinances of the General Society of the Cincinnati. Through his efforts to recruit new members, define policies and establish administrative procedures, he was probably the single person most responsible for the rejuvenation for the Society of the Cincinnati in the late 19th century.

Gardiner was elected president of the Rhode Island Society following at a special meeting of the Rhode Island Society on December 14, 1899, which was called as a result of the death of President Nathanael Greene, M.D. (b. 1809) (the grandson of General Nathanael Greene) on July 8, 1899. Gardiner remained president of the Rhode Island Society, as well as Secretary General of the national Society, until his death in 1919.

In the 41 years that Gardiner was active in the Society, it grew greatly both in membership and prestige and all of the dormant state societies were rejuvenated.

In March 1901 Gardiner traveled, on behalf of the Rhode Island Society, to Savannah, Georgia, and located the grave of Major General Nathanael Greene, a native of Rhode Island and hero of the American Revolution. Gardiner was able to locate General Greene's grave and although some thought was given to moving Greene's remains to Rhode Island, it did not come to fruition.

Gardiner was highly involved in the planning for the dedication of a statue of the French nobleman Rochambeau in Lafayette Square in Washington, D.C., on May 24, 1902. The ceremony involved an official delegation from France, senior officers the United States Army and Navy, as well as the Society of the Cincinnati. President Theodore Roosevelt gave the keynote address at the ceremony.

In 1905 the Rhode Island Society published The Order of the Cincinnati in France, which Gardiner wrote. The 243 page volume contains detailed biographies of all the senior officers of the French Army who served in America during the revolution.

Gardiner was succeeded in the Society by his son Asa Bird Gardiner Jr. (1872–1936) who, in 1939, was succeeded by his brother, Norman Bentley Gardiner, Sr. (1874-1942), who was the eldest surviving son of Asa Bird Gardiner Sr. Norman Bentley Gardiner Sr. was succeeded by his son, Norman Bentley Gardiner Jr., in 1945 and was a member of the Rhode Island Society until his death in 1982.

== Family ==
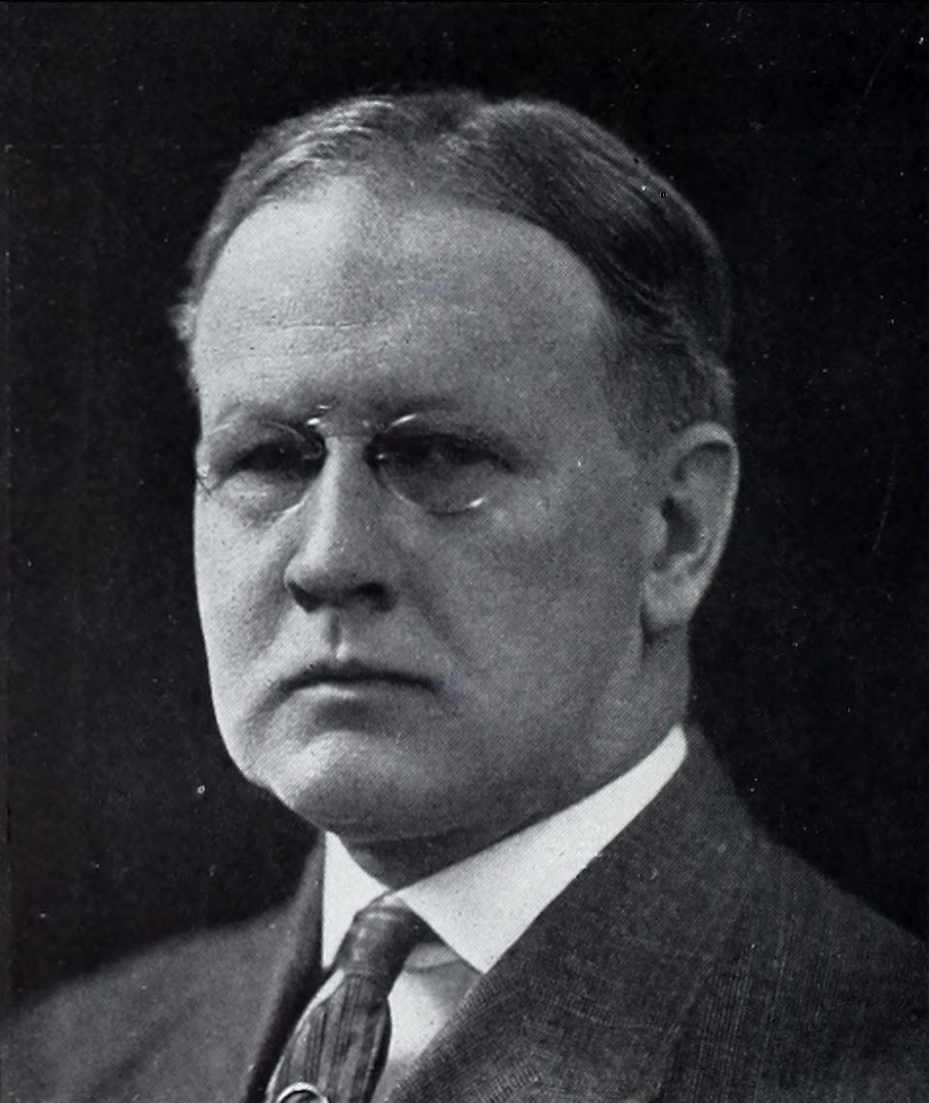
Asa Bird Gardiner Jr. (c. 1914)

Gardiner married Mary Austen of Baltimore, Maryland, on October 18, 1865. They had three sons: Asa Bird Jr., Philip and Norman. Mary Austen Gardiner died in June 1900. Gardiner's son Philip served as a major in the Army Judge Advocate General Corps during the First World War. Asa Bird Gardiner Jr. was a prominent milk distributor in Baltimore and succeeded his father in the Society of the Cincinnati.

On November 5, 1902, at the age of 63, Gardiner married Harriet Isabelle Lindsay, by whom he had two sons, John and William.

== Death ==
Asa Bird Gardiner died of a stroke at his home, Orrell Manor, in Suffern, New York, on May 24, 1919, at the age of 79. He was buried in Green-Wood Cemetery in Brooklyn.

== In popular culture ==
Gardiner was portrayed by actor John Glover in the 1994 television movie Assault at West Point: The Court-Martial of Johnson Whittaker which portrays the experiences of African-American Cadet Johnson Chesnut Whittaker.

Gardiner was also featured in Douglas Jone's alternate history novel The Court Martial Of George Armstrong Custer as the military prosecutor who tries General Custer for negligence after he survives the Battle of Little Big Horn.

== Dates of rank ==
- 1st Lieutenant, 34th New York Infantry - 27 May 1861
- Mustered out 7 Aug 1861
- Captain, 22nd New York State Militia - 31 May 1862
- Mustered out - 5 Sept 1862
- Captain, 22nd New York State Militia - 18 June 1863
- Mustered out - 24 July 1863
- 1st Lieutenant, Veteran Reserve Corps - 11 Feb 1865
- Brevet Captain, Volunteers - 13 March 1865 for gallantry and meritorious service during the war
- Regimental Adjutant 7th Veteran Reserve Corps Regiment - 29 May 1865
- 2nd Lieutenant, 9th Infantry Regiment, Regular Army - 20 July 1866
- Honorably Mustered out of Volunteers - 13 August 1866
- 1st Lieutenant, 9th Infantry Regiment - 14 February 1868
- Transferred to 1st Artillery Regiment - 3 April 1869
- Major, Judge Advocate General Corps - 18 August 1873
- Retired - 8 December 1888
- Lieutenant Colonel, Regular Army Retired List - 23 April 1904

== See also ==
- List of Medal of Honor recipients

Legal offices
Preceded by William M. K. Olcott	New York County District Attorney; 1898–1900	Succeeded by Eugene A. Philbin
