= Assault at West Point: The Court-Martial of Johnson Whittaker =

1994 television film

- Written by: Harry Moses
- Directed by: Harry Moses
- Starring: Samuel L. Jackson; Sam Waterston; Seth Gilliam
- Music by: Terence Blanchard
- Country of origin: United States

Production
- Cinematography: Ken Kelsch
- Running time: 98 minutes
- Production company: Ultra Entertainment (a division of Capital Cities/ABC Video Enterprises Inc.)

Original release
- Release: February 27, 1994

Assault at West Point is a 1994 Showtime made-for-cable drama film about Johnson Chesnut Whittaker, one of the first black cadets at West Point, and the trial that followed an assault he suffered in 1880. The film features Samuel L. Jackson, who portrays Richard Greener, a lawyer who defends Whittaker. The movie is based on historian John F. Marszalek's book Court Martial: A Black Man in America.

== Plot ==
Johnson Whittaker, a black cadet at West Point, is attacked by three fellow students. The school administrators court-martial Whittaker in the mistaken belief that he staged his own attack, supposedly to avoid a philosophy exam.

The assault on him by fellow cadets quickly makes its way into the press and gained widespread attention. Richard Greener is the Harvard alumnus lawyer who defends Whittaker at his trial and, since he is also black, has also personally experienced racism. Greener's partner, Daniel Chamberlain, does not share his determination but rather has a different agenda – acquiring fame.

The trial begins and the two lawyers are at odds with one another. The prosecutor, Major Asa Bird Gardiner, cross-examines Whittaker, who manages to evade his tactics. On the day the verdict is to be delivered, the officer whose vote they had hoped would be favorable does not show up in court. The other four officers find Whittaker guilty of assaulting himself so as not to participate in the exam.

The film closes in later years, with Whittaker being interviewed by a reporter. Whittaker tells him that he went on to become a school principal, while Greener is now retired. He also informs the reporter that Chamberlain later went on to defend lynching. "People will sometimes do anything to gather fame", states Whittaker, to which the reporter replies, "I wonder what hidden agenda he was carrying". The film ends with the reporter telephoning the newspaper and telling them to hold the first page; he has a great story.

== Cast ==
- Samuel L. Jackson as Richard Greener
- Sam Waterston as Daniel Chamberlain
- Mason Adams as Henry D. Hyde
- Val Avery as General William T. Sherman
- Eddie Bracken as Major Charles T. Alexander
- Seth Gilliam as Johnson Whittaker
- Al Freeman, Jr. as Old Johnson Whittaker
- John Glover as Major Asa Bird Gardiner
