= Sarah Yorke Jackson =

First Lady of the United States from 1834 to 1837

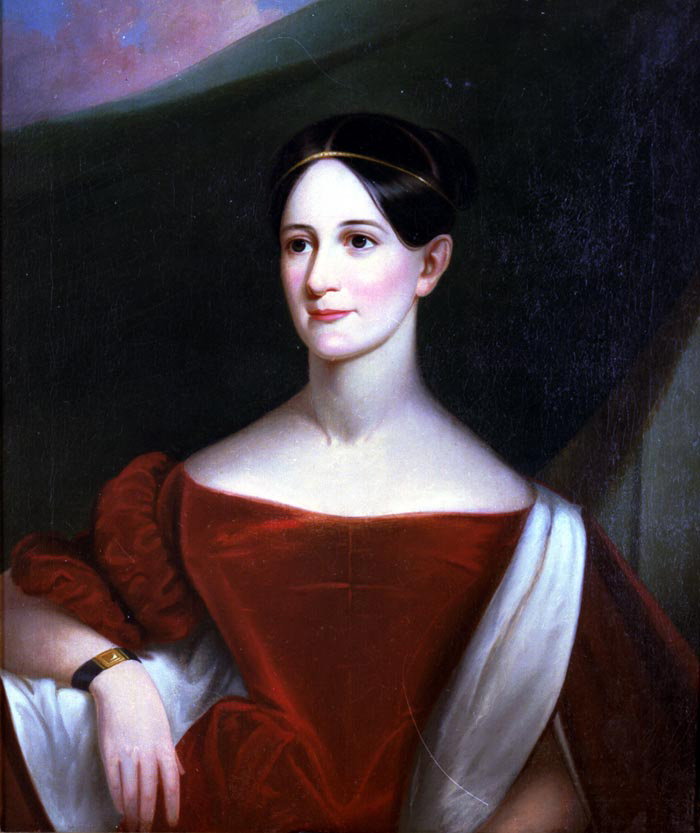
- Portrait created by Ralph Eleaser Whiteside Earl, c. 1833, completed by Mayna Treanor Avent, c. 1921

First Lady of the United States
- Acting; November 26, 1834 – March 4, 1837
- President: Andrew Jackson
- Preceded by: Emily Donelson
- Succeeded by: Angelica Van Buren

Personal details
- Born: Sarah Yorke; July 1805 Philadelphia, Pennsylvania, U.S.
- Died: August 23, 1887 (aged 82) The Hermitage, Nashville, Tennessee, U.S.
- Spouse: Andrew Jackson Jr. (m. 1831; died 1865)
- Children: 5
- Relatives: Andrew Jackson (father-in-law)

Sarah Jackson (née Yorke; July 1805 – August 23, 1887) was an American woman who was the White House hostess and acting first lady of the United States from November 26, 1834, to March 4, 1837. She served in this role as the daughter-in-law of U.S. president Andrew Jackson after marrying his adopted son, Andrew Jackson Jr. She had initially been named as mistress of the Jackson residence in Tennessee, the Hermitage, but she moved to the White House and became co-hostess with Emily Donelson after the Hermitage was damaged in a fire. When Donelson fell ill, Sarah Jackson took on the position of White House hostess in its entirety for the remainder of the term. After leaving the White House, she returned to the repaired Hermitage, living there for the remainder of her life.

== Early life ==
Sarah Yorke was born in July 1805, in Philadelphia, Pennsylvania, into a wealthy Quaker family. Her father Peter Yorke, a sea captain and successful merchant, died in 1815. Her mother Mary Haines Yorke died during a trip to New Orleans in 1820, leaving Sarah and her two sisters orphaned. She was raised by two aunts, Mrs. George Farquhar and Mrs. Mordecai Wetherill.

Sarah Yorke married Andrew Jackson Jr., the adopted son of President Andrew Jackson, in Philadelphia on November 24, 1831. The president's schedule prevented him from attending the wedding, but the couple was invited to stay at the White House over the following months. Their stay in the White House served as an extended honeymoon, and several parties were held in their honor. She bonded with the president, who considered her to be like a daughter. There was speculation as to whether she would become the new White House hostess, but the role remained with the president's niece, Emily Donelson.

Upon leaving the White House, the new couple went to The Hermitage, Jacksons' plantation in Tennessee. Wishing to clearly distinguish Sarah Y. Jackson's role from that of White House hostess Donelson, the president had appointed Jackson as the "mistress of the Hermitage". This was in part to avoid any potential animosity between them, but the decision was primarily to ensure that Donelson's husband remained in the White House as the president's secretary. Sarah gave birth to all five of her children at the Hermitage, beginning with her daughter Rachel Jackson in 1832.

Their stay at the Hermitage was interrupted on October 13, 1834, when a fire destroyed much of the main house. They found a home to stay in at Hunter's Hill, but the incident had a severe emotional effect on Jackson. As winter approached, they decided it would be preferable to stay at the White House.

== White House hostess ==
The family arrived at the White House on November 26, 1834, and Sarah made extensive purchases to replace their lost belongings at the president's expense. Sarah immediately began to take on the role as co-hostess of the White House along with Donelson. It was the only time in history when there were two women simultaneously acting as White House hostess. As Donelson became seriously ill, Sarah became the White House hostess in its entire capacity in October 1836. She remained the sole hostess for the remainder of her father-in-law's presidency.

Sarah was not terribly active as a hostess. The death of Rachel Jackson had limited any significant social activity in the White House, and this was compounded by the death of Emily Donelson. She remained at the White House for the final ten months of President Jackson's term, though she made several lengthy trips, including one to the Hermitage to oversee its reconstruction. The family left the White House when President Jackson's term ended in March 1837.

== Later life and legacy ==
Sarah Yorke Jackson continued to oversee the Hermitage after leaving the White House. She remained close to the former president and cared for him for the remainder of his life. In 1838, she assisted him in his crisis of faith that led him to join her in the Presbyterian Church—something that he had considered doing even before his presidency. Upon his death, the former president left her four of his female slaves. The family sold the Hermitage to the state of Tennessee in 1856, but Sarah Jackson was allowed to continue living there for the remainder of her life. Her sons, Andrew Jackson lll and Samuel fought with the Confederate States Army during the American Civil War, and her son Samuel died during the Battle of Chickamauga. Her husband died in 1865. Sarah Yorke Jackson died on August 23, 1887, in Nashville, Tennessee, at the age of 82.

Sarah Yorke Jackson had little influence on the position of first lady, as her short tenure and the social circumstances of the Andrew Jackson presidency offered her little opportunity to stand out. By the time she reached old age, she had largely been forgotten by the American public, and she has since been the subject of very little scholarly analysis.

== See also ==
- Bibliography of United States presidential spouses and first ladies

Honorary titles
Preceded by Emily Donelson; Acting	First Lady of the United States; Acting; 1834–1837	Vacant Title next held by Angelica Van Buren; Acting
