= Peggy Eaton =

American politician (1799–1879)

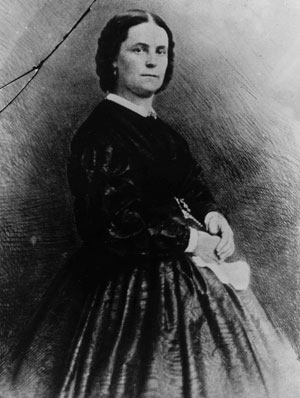
- Born: Margaret O'Neill; December 3, 1799; Washington, D.C., U.S.
- Died: November 8, 1879 (aged 79); Washington, D.C., U.S.
- Resting place: Oak Hill Cemetery; Washington, D.C., U.S.
- Spouses: John B. Timberlake (m. 1816; died 1828) John Henry Eaton (m. 1829; died 1856) Antonio Gabriele Buchignani (m. 1859; div. 1869)
- Children: 3

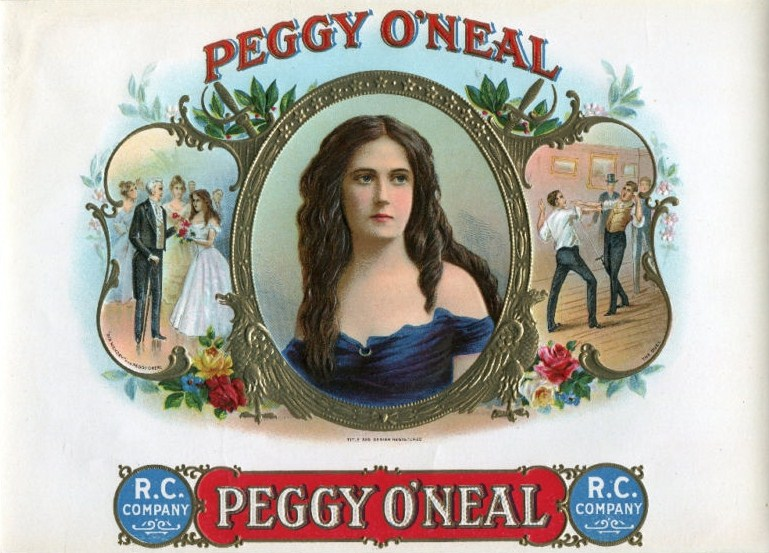
Cigar box shows President Jackson introduced to Peggy (left) and two lovers fighting a duel over her (right).

Margaret Eaton (née O'Neill, formerly Timberlake, later Buchignani; December 3, 1799 – November 8, 1879), was the wife of John Henry Eaton, a United States senator from Tennessee and United States Secretary of War, and a confidant of Andrew Jackson. Their marriage was the cause of a national controversy known as the Petticoat affair. While better known in history as Peggy, Margaret stated in her autobiography, "I never was called Peggy in all my life...I was ordinarily called by my proper name of Margaret."

== Early life ==
Margaret O'Neill was the daughter of Rhoda Howell and William O'Neill, the owner of Franklin House, a popular Washington, D.C., hotel. She had five siblings: William, Robert, John, Mary, and Georgianna.

As a girl, she was noted for her beauty, wit and vivacity. Well-educated for her time and gender, she studied French and was known for her ability to play the piano. William T. Barry, who later served as Postmaster General, wrote "of a charming little girl...who very frequently plays the piano, and entertains us with agreeable songs." As a young girl, her reputation was already under scrutiny because she worked in a bar frequented by men and casually bantered with the boardinghouse clientele. An elderly Margaret reminisced that, "While I was still in pantalets and rolling hoops with other girls I had the attention of men, young and old, enough to turn a girl's head."

== First marriage ==
About 1816, at age 17, Margaret O'Neill married John B. Timberlake, a 39-year-old purser in the Navy. Her parents gave them a house across from the hotel, and they met many politicians who stayed there. In 1818 they met and befriended John Henry Eaton, a 28-year-old widower and newly elected senator from Tennessee. Margaret and John Timberlake had three children: William (b. 1817; d. 1818), Mary Virginia (b. 1819), and Margaret Rose (1825–1855).

== Second marriage and scandal ==
John Timberlake died in 1828 while at sea in the Mediterranean, in service on a four-year voyage. Though the conventions of society required an extended mourning period, the widow Margaret Timberlake married Senator Eaton on January 1, 1829, just nine months after Timberlake's death. As a result, rumors circulated that Timberlake had committed suicide because of despair at an alleged affair between his wife and Eaton. An autopsy concluded that Timberlake died of pneumonia brought on by pulmonary disease.

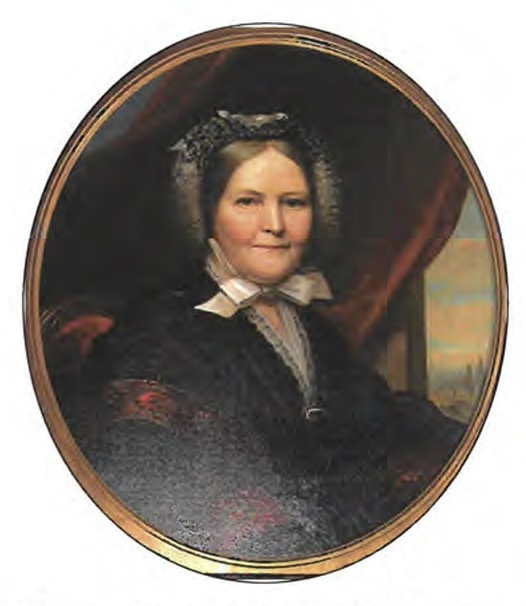
Margaret Peggy O'Neil Timberlake Eaton (1796–1879), painted by Henry Inman (Portraits of Williamson County, Williamson County Tennessee Historical Society; The Hermitage collection)

After John Eaton was appointed as Secretary of War, rumors continued and Margaret Eaton was snubbed by other cabinet wives. President Andrew Jackson, who was known to have little patience for political slander and gossip, defended her honor. She became the subject of the Petticoat affair, in which the wives of cabinet members and other prominent Washingtonians refused to pay social calls on the Eatons and refused them invitations to parties and other events.

Jackson tried unsuccessfully to coerce the cabinet wives into ending their snubbing of the Eatons. Vice President John C. Calhoun, whose wife, Floride Calhoun, was seen as the anti-Eaton ringleader, supported his wife. This caused Jackson to transfer his favor to widower Martin Van Buren, the Secretary of State, who had taken the Eatons' side and shown positive social attention to Margaret. Van Buren helped end the Petticoat Affair by resigning, which gave Jackson the ability to remove his anti-Eaton cabinet members. Calhoun was not renominated for vice president and resigned shortly before the end of his term to accept election to the U.S. Senate. Van Buren became vice president in 1833, and was well-placed to become Jackson's successor in 1837.

== Societal implications ==
Historian John F. Marszalek explained his view of the real reasons Washington society found Margaret unacceptable:

She did not know her place; she forthrightly spoke up about anything that came to her mind, even topics of which women were supposed to be ignorant. She thrust herself into the world in a manner inappropriate for a woman...Accept her, and society was in danger of disruption. Accept this uncouth, impure, forward, worldly woman, and the wall of virtue and morality would be breached and society would have no further defenses against the forces of frightening change. Margaret Eaton was not that important in herself; it was what she represented that constituted the threat. Proper women had no choice; they had to prevent her acceptance into society as part of their defense of that society's morality.

Author Jon Meacham points out that Margaret Eaton's life was unusual for its time. She was, according to Meacham "by her own account...an outgoing flirt" – her tongue was "ungoverned, and ungovernable." He also points out that she craved attention: "At various points in her life she was courted by an adjutant general, a major and a captain – which delighted her."

In a memoir published long after her death, Margaret admitted to the accuracy of some of the characterizations of her: "The fact is, I never had a lover who was not a gentleman and was not in a good position in society." "I must have said a great many foolish things" wrote Margaret, "I am sure I did very few wise ones. I was foolish, hasty, but not vicious." Refusing to defend herself directly, Margaret Eaton expressed her opinion of her critics this way: "I was quite as independent as they, and had more powerful friends...None of them had beauty, accomplishments or graces in society of any kind, and for these reasons...they were jealous of me."

Meacham observes that, "it's impossible...to assess the truth of the charges" lodged by her enemies, but "she offers this "interesting defense":

"Just let a little commonsense be exercised. While I do not pretend to be a saint, and do not think I was ever very much stocked with sense, and lay no claim to be a model woman in any way, I put it to the candor of the world whether the slanders which have been uttered against me are to be believed."

== Third marriage and later life ==
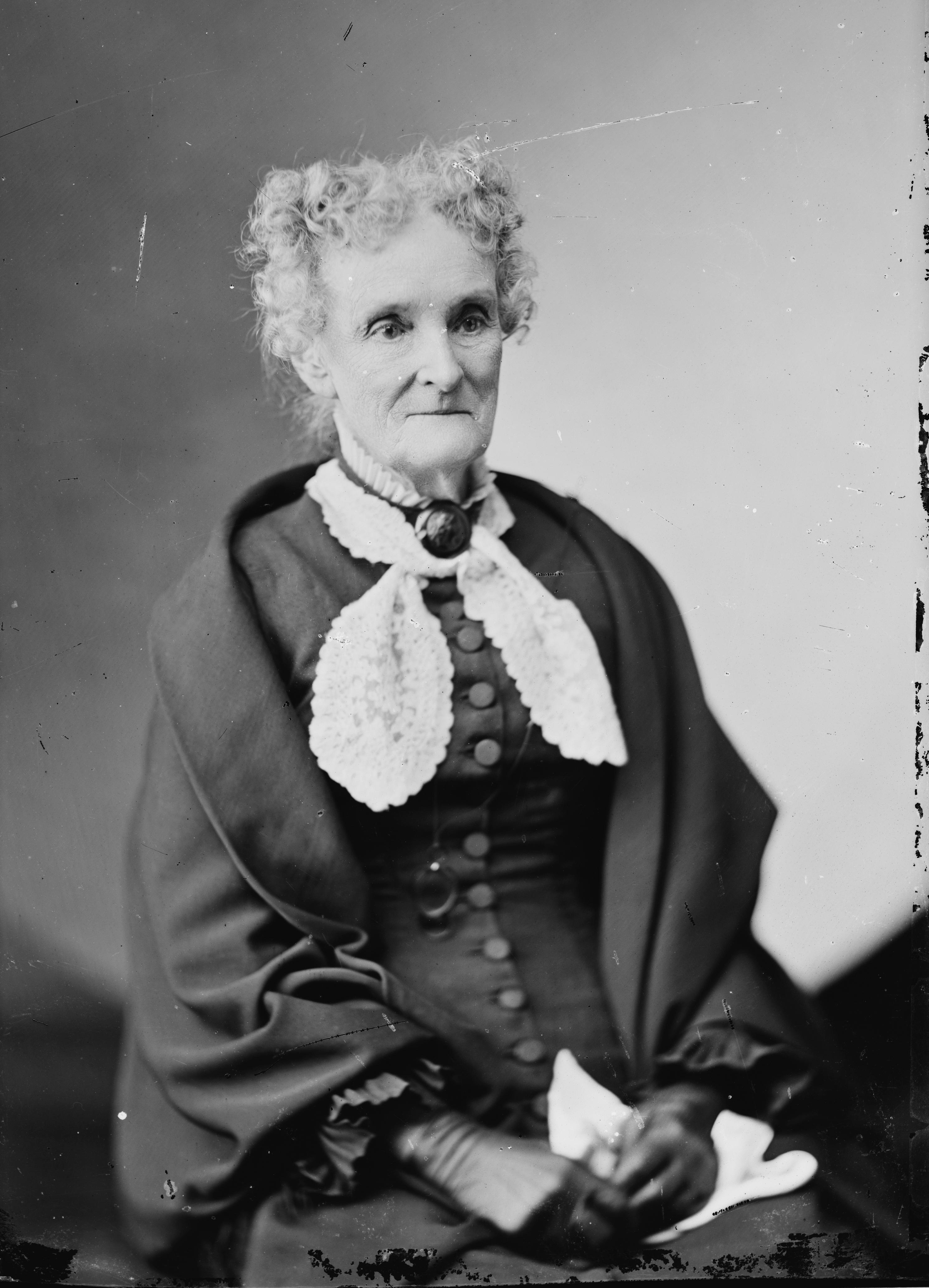
Margaret O'Neill Eaton in later life ("Mrs. Margaret Eaton [Peggy O'Neill], old lady" – Title from unverified information on negative sleeve," "annotation from negative, scratched into emulsion: Mrs. Eaton, 2696." Brady-Handy Collection, Library of Congress)

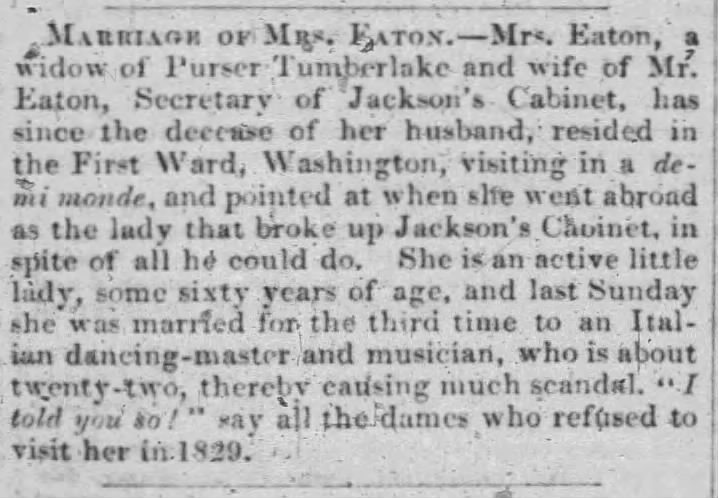
"Marriage of Mrs. Eaton" The Pittsfield Sun, June 23, 1859

Three years after the death of her second husband, Margaret Eaton married Antonio Gabriele Buchignani, an Italian music teacher and dancing master, on June 7, 1859. She was 59 and he was in his mid-20s. The marriage reignited much of the social stigma Margaret had carried earlier in life.

In 1866, their seventh year of marriage, Buchignani ran off to Europe with the bulk of his wife's fortune as well as her 17-year-old granddaughter Emily E. Randolph. He married Randolph after he and Margaret divorced in 1869.

Although Margaret Eaton obtained a divorce from Buchignani, she was not able to recover her financial standing. She died in poverty in Washington, D.C., on November 8, 1879, and was buried at Oak Hill Cemetery.
