= John B. Timberlake =

American naval officer (c. 1777–1828)

John Bowie Timberlake (c. 1777 – April 2, 1828) was a protagonist in the American political scandal known as the Petticoat affair. His wife Margaret was rumored to have had an affair with John Eaton, who became Secretary of War in President Andrew Jackson's cabinet. The scandal brought about the resignation of most members of Jackson's cabinet.

== Background ==
John Bowie Timberlake was a purser in the United States Navy. During his initial service in the military, he fell into massive debt.

In 1816, when he was around 39 years old, he married teenaged Margaret O'Neill. They moved into a house in Washington, D.C. provided by her father, across the street from his hotel and tavern called the Franklin House. In 1818, the couple met the widowed United States Senator John Eaton, then age 28. Eaton, recently elected and the youngest U.S. Senator, stayed at Franklin House.

Timberlake and Eaton became fast friends, and Timberlake confessed his financial problems. Eaton introduced a petition to the United States Senate to relieve Timberlake of debts collected while he was in service to the Navy. The Senate failed to act on his request and Timberlake slipped deeper into debt. He returned to the Navy, leaving his wife and their daughter, Mary Virginia Timberlake, behind in Washington. He returned for short periodic visits between voyages. In 1825, he fathered another daughter, Margaret Rose Timberlake.

Timberlake left for a four-year voyage on the USS Constitution. During his long absence, Margaret was rumored to have suffered a miscarriage, from a pregnancy that could only have resulted from an affair with another man. Timberlake died at sea on April 2, 1828. He had been ill, and newspapers reported that he had died of pulmonary disease (probably pneumonia) while on board ship in the Mediterranean Sea.

Later reports suggested that he had committed suicide by slitting his own throat because of the alleged affair between his wife and Eaton. When the Constitution put in at Mahón on the Spanish island of Menorca, Timberlake was buried with full military honors.

On January 1, 1829, almost nine months after John Timberlake's death, Margaret Timberlake and John Eaton married. Their action brought widespread criticism because they had not waited until the passing of a proper mourning period. The circumstances of their marriage led to a political crisis, the Petticoat affair, during President Andrew Jackson's first term in office. When John Eaton was later appointed minister to Spain, the Eatons and Timberlake's daughters visited his gravesite.
