= William Joseph Snelling =

American journalist (1804–1848)

William Joseph Snelling (December 26, 1804 – December 24, 1848) was an American adventurer, writer, poet, and journalist. His short stories about Native American life were the first to attempt to accurately portray the Native Americans living on the plains and are among the first attempts at realism by an American writer. Snelling's short story collections were among the earliest in the United States. He wrote for New England and New York City periodicals on subjects such as American writing, gambling, and prison conditions.

== Early life ==
William Joseph Snelling was born on December 26, 1804, in Boston, Massachusetts. His father, Josiah Snelling, was an officer in the army, and his mother was Elizabeth Bell. His mother died when he was six years old, and Snelling moved outside Boston to live with relatives and attend school. At age 14, Snelling entered West Point.

== Life on "the frontier" ==
Two years later, Snelling left West Point and gradually moved west. He lived with the Dakota tribe of American Indians for a winter. In 1821, Snelling reached his father's military post at Fort St. Anthony (later Fort Snelling) at the confluence of the Mississippi and Minnesota rivers. William Joseph Snelling stayed there for five years, trading in furs and exploring the surroundings. During his time with the Dakota, he had learned their language and customs, and he worked as an interpreter between the Indian Agency and the Indians. For example, he helped negotiate the resolution of hostilities between the Dakota and the Chippewa and Winnebago tribes.

On September 15, 1826, at Fort Crawford, Prairie du Chien, at the confluence of the Mississippi and Wisconsin rivers (now Crawford County, WI), William J. Snelling married Dionice Fournier. She was born in Villeret, Canton of Berne, Switzerland in 1810. In 1821 she immigrated to the Red River Colony/Selkirk settlement (in the portion of Rupertsland that would, in 1870, become Manitoba, Canada) with her widowed mother and three siblings. Dionice died in 1827 outside of Fort Crawford. Josiah Snelling died in 1828, and William Joseph Snelling moved on.

== Writing career (and his social / political activism) ==
Snelling returned to Boston and entered the writing field. Over the next 20 years, he wrote pieces for American Monthly, Boston Book, the Boston Herald, the New England Galaxy, Joseph T. Buckingham's New England Magazine, North American Review, and Samuel Griswold Goodrich's Token. Snelling expressed frank opinions on American society and proposed social reforms, earning him both praise and enmity. Truth: A New Year's Gift for Scribblers is an early example. The piece, written in 1831, satirizes American letters. As editor of the New England Galaxy, Snelling initiated an anti-gambling movement among Boston's newspapers. He was sued for libel and fought back by publishing his editorials in pamphlet form, called "Exposé of the Vice of Gaming", in 1833. He used the proceeds to pay his legal costs. He later served four months in jail for drunkenness. The experience led him in 1837 to take on prison reform with his The Rat-Trap; or Cogitations of a Convict in the House of Correction.

=== Tales of the Northwest and other "Indian" and "frontier" short stories ===
Snelling earned his greatest fame as a writer of short stories about his experiences on the American frontier. He realized that the lifestyle of the Plains Indians was under threat, and he deemed the popular characterization of Indians in American literature to be stereotyped and inaccurate. He thus tried for realism in his stories, making him one of the earliest American writers to do so. In 1830, Snelling published a compilation of ten of his frontier stories as Tales of the Northwest; or, Sketches of Indian Life and Character; this is one of the earliest short story collections published in the United States.

According to Israel Augustus Newhall, writing half a century after the fact, we get this glimpse of young William J. Snelling as he prepared Tales of the Northwest for publication: "Among those who at this time – about 1829 – frequented the office, was William J. Snelling, then a young man of twenty-five years. His interesting work delineated scenes and experiences beyond the frontier, giving graphic pictures of his life far away from any civilized community, was then in process of printing, and was, I believe, the first book he ever issued. It fell to my lot to read the first proofs. Mr. Snelling was a striking character; vigorous, fearless and industrious. He was born in Boston, was a son of Col. Josiah Snelling, and educated at West Point."

Modern ethnographers still recognize his works as the first accurate literary portrayal of the lifestyle of the Plains Indians. In "The Last of the Iron Hearts", Snelling wrote, "[We] beg leave to assure our readers, that the Indian is not the ferocious brute of Hubbard and Mather, or the brilliant, romantic, half-French, half-Celtic Mohegan and Yemassee created by Symmes and Cooper." He further claimed that one "must live, emphatically, live, with Indians; share with them their lodges, their food, and their blankets, for years, before he can comprehend their ideas, or enter into their feelings."

=== Boston years: other fiction and journalism (1830-1838) ===
Throughout the 1830s, while based in his native Boston, Snelling's literary output was prodigious. He wrote several books, dozens of short stories and poems, as well as book reviews and other political journalism and social satire. Throughout these same years, Snelling was frequently employed as the editor of one or another of various Boston newspapers.

Soon after Tales of the Northwest came Tales of travels west of the Mississippi, A brief and impartial history of the life and actions of Andrew Jackson, president of the United States (1831), Tales of travels in Central Africa (1831), and Truth, a gift for scribblers, in 1832.

Frederic Hudson had this to say of Snelling's time as editor of the New-England Galaxy:

The New England Galaxy, the publication of which was commenced by [Joseph T.] Buckingham in 1820, has been edited by a number of writers at different periods. Theophilus Parsons, author of "Deux Homo" and "The Infinite and the Finite," and for many years Professor of Law in Harvard College, was one. About 1833 it was under the management of William J. Snelling, a very erratic, but brilliant and powerful writer at that time. When he had charge of the Galaxy he made a desperate war upon the gamblers of Boston. He had his office ornamented with the paraphernalia of an extensive gambling establishment. All sorts of threats were made against him by the gamblers. It was the sensation of that day. So many stories were related of him that people visited his office in numbers to see it, and its wonderful and bold editor. He was always found, at that time, in a miniature fortress, selling his own paper over the counter. He was to be seen on Sunday mornings in his shirt sleeves, walking to and fro, evidently ready for any emergency. We believe no attack was made upon him; the matter became a nine days' wonder, and after that Snelling edited, for a brief period, a paper called the Censor, in New York. Several young journalists, such as Isaac C. Pray and A.L. Stimson, took charge of the Galaxy in 1838, and managed it till they sought "other fields and pastures green.

In the spring of 1838, Snelling left Boston for New York City, with some regret. He wrote in the Censor: "Cradle of my infancy, school of my manhood, grave of my hopes, farewell, I think, forever. I have done thee some service, and thou knowest it - how I have been thanked thou also knowest. With all thy faults, I love thee still... Boston is no place for a man to live in. He can obtain but small compensation for his labor, and this half the time, he cannot get. Still, Boston forever! There was I born, and there would I gladly lay my wearied bones. Fare thee well! Boston." Snelling spent most of the next nine years in New York City, but returned to his home town in 1847 to become editor of the Boston Herald, a position he held until his death in late 1848.

=== New York years (1838-1847) ===
Snelling spent the years 1838 to 1847 in New York City, editing a number of newspapers and magazines. Upon his arrival in New York, Snelling started the Censor. For a short time, he also was editor of the Polyanthos, and worked as a writer for Wooldridge's Whip and Satirist of New-York and Brooklin in 1842. Snelling was a key player in the weekly Sunday Flash, while at the same time served as editor of the "more respectable" weekly the Sunday Times, along "with a young editorial partner named Walter Whitman." Later, in mid-1843, the Sunday Times merged with Mordecai Noah's Weekly Messenger. Through the Sunday Flash, Snelling developed a notorious reputation for his pioneering role in what Patricia Cline Cohen, Timothy J. Gilfoyle and Helen Lefkowitz Horowitz describe as the "Flash Press," New York City "small weekly newspapers ... aimed to entertain and enlighten literate sporting men about leisure-time activities and erotic entertainments available" in that city, especially in the period from late 1841 to early 1843. "Distinguished by a trenchant, mocking humor and a titillating brew of gossip about prostitutes, theatrical denizens, and sports contests, the papers offered guidance to men young and old intent on navigating the new world of unrestricted pleasure and commercialized leisure in the city. They frequently defended such behaviors in the vernacular of republicanism and democracy."

=== Return to Boston (1847-1848) ===
In the spring of 1847, Snelling returned to Boston to become editor of the Boston Herald, a position he held until his death in late 1848. In these final 18 months of his life, Snelling covered the endgame of the Mexican-American War, as well as the 1848 presidential election. Under Snelling, the Boston Herald took a strong position in support of the eventual winner of that election, Zachary Taylor of the Whig Party, who defeated both Democrat Lewis Cass and former president Martin Van Buren of the Free Soil Party.

== Death ==
Snelling died on December 24, 1848. "Within four hours after the death of Mr. Snelling, his father-in-law, Mr. Simon Jordan, (with whom Mr. S. lived,) fell from his chair and suddenly expired also."

== Critical reception ==
=== Nineteenth century ===
Several years after Snelling's death, this assessment of Snelling and his work appeared in The Cyclopaedia of Anecdotes of Literature and the Fine Arts: Most of our readers must have been acquainted with William J. Snelling, of Boston, a man whose mind was like a good and beautiful ship, driven about at the mercy of the winds and the waves, without sails or compass. He was a lawyer and a writer, and in his latter profession distinguished himself as a keen, powerful, but vindictive satirist: his wit, too, was as pointed and brilliant as his sarcasm, and his observation of men and things was quick and vigorous. His Tales of the North-west, which first brought him into notice some ten years since, -- in short, all his prose articles as well as his poetry, -- have always found a ready publication, and numerous and admiring readers. All have given him a high intellectual character, and a literary reputation which will long survive him. Such were some of his virtues, but his prominent follies and vices were more visible and no less numerous. From his ill success in life, his poverty, and his disappointments, he flew to the last and worst expedient of drowning sorrow, by drinking deep from the bowl of the drunkard. Remorse then did its work and William J. Snelling, the man of genius and education, was found, first a drunkard in the watch-house, then a volunteer petitioner at the Police Court, begging that he might "be placed out of the public view for six month." The prison was now his home, and he prisoner free from temptation.}}

=== Twentieth century ===
Snelling's tales met with critical acclaim, and modern critics praise them. In 1923, Fred Lewis Pattee wrote that "his Indian stories are undoubtedly the best written during the early period [of American literature]" Contemporary biographer Mary R. Reichardt credits Snelling with "creating . . . engaging and vigorous tales based on Native-American life and legend as well as stories of the cultural conflict resulting from the early white settlements on the frontier", although the stories "lapse at times into sentimentality and didacticism."

== Selected works of William Joseph Snelling ==
=== Books ===
==== Snelling's authorship either verified, or generally accepted ====
- Tales of the Northwest, or, Sketches of Indian Life and Character, by a Resident Beyond the Frontier, (Boston: Hilliard, Gray, Little, and Wilkins, 1830); reprinted, with an introduction by John T. Flanagan (Minneapolis: University of Minnesota Press, 1936); reprinted, with an edited and introduction by David Stineback (New Haven: College * Univ. Press, 1975).
- A Brief and Impartial History of the Life and Actions of Andrew Jackson, President of the United States, by A Free Man, (Boston: Stimpson and Clapp, 1831).
- The Polar Regions of the Western Continent Explored, (Boston: Printed for W.W. Reed, 1831)
- Truth: A New Year's Gift for Scribblers, (Boston: Stephen Foster, 1831)
- Truth, A Gift for Scribblers.Second Edition, with additions and emendations, (Boston: B.B. Mussey, 1832).
- Exposé of the Vice of Gaming, as it lately existed in Massachusetts. Boston: W.J.Snelling, 1833.
- Trial of William J. Snelling: for a libel on the Honorable Benjamin Whitman, senior judge of the Police Court: Commonwealth vs. Snelling, (Boston: printed for the reporter, 1834).
- The Rat-Trap; or Cogitations of a Convict in the House of Correction. Boston: G.M. Thomson, 1837.

Writing for Samuel Griswold Goodrich, under the pseudonym of Solomon Bell:

- Tales of Travel West of the Mississippi, (Boston: Gray and Bowen, 1830).
- Tales of Travels in Central Africa, (Boston: Gray and Bowen, 1831).

==== Snelling's authorship either suggested, yet still unproved, or otherwise disputed ====
- William Apess, Indian nullification of the unconstitutional laws of Massachusetts relative to the Marshpee tribe, or, The pretended riot explained, (Boston: Press of Jonathan Howe, 1835).

=== Book reviews, "Literary Notices" etc. ===
- "Literary Notices: Poems by William Cullen Bryant," New-England Magazine, (March 1832), pp. 265–266.
- "Literary Notices: Indian Biography; Samuel Drake," The New-England Magazine, Vol 2, Issue 6 (June 1832), pp. 525–527.
- "Literary Notices: Remarks made on a Tour to Prairie du Chien. By Caleb Atwater," New-England Magazine, Vol.3, Issue 3, (Sept.1832), pp. 247–253.
- REVIEW: The Present State of New-England with respect to the Indian War. Wherein is an Account of the true Reason thereof, (as far as can be judged by Men.) Together with most of the Remarkable Passages that have happened fro the 20th of June till the 10th of November 1675, reprinted by Josiah Drake, Antiquarian Bookstore, 56 Cornhill, 1833.
- REVIEW: Samuel Drake, "Biography and History of the Indians of North-America, &c." The New-England Magazine (June 1834).
- REVIEW: "Life of Black Hawk," review of Life of Ma-Ka-Tai-Me-SheKia-Kiak, or Black Hawk [sic], by Black Hawk, North American Review 40 (1835): 68, 69.

=== Short stories ===
==== "Indian" or "Frontier" short stories ====
- "Pah Erashuatee, or The Metamorphosis" in The Amateur. Boston, Vol. I, No.2, July 3, 1830, pp. 22–24.
- "A Journey Up the Mississippi" in The Amateur. Boston. in two parts: Vol I, No.6, September 4, 1830, pp. 85–88; Vol. I, No.7, October 1, 1830, pp. 101–105.
- "A Night in the Woods" - first appearance in The Amateur. Boston. Vol I, No. 8, October 23, 1830, pp. 117–119; reprinted in the New-England Galaxy as "A Tale in the Woods" on October 29, 1830. Reprinted, with alterations, with the original title, "A Night in the Woods," in Ladies' Companion, A Monthly Magazine of Literature and the Arts, Embellished with Many Different Engravings, with Music, arranged for the Piano Forte, &c. &c, (New York: W.W. Snowden), 4: 98-100 (January 1836); reprinted in The Boston Book, Being Specimens of Metropolitan Literature, pp. 40–48 (1836).
- "The Siege of Fort Madison" in The Amateur. Boston. in two parts: Vol. I, No. 9, November 6, 1830; Vol. I, no. 10, November 22, 1830, pp. 141–145.
- "A Tale of the Northwest" in The Amateur Vol.I, No.12, January 15, 1831, pp. 173–177.
- "Te Zahpahtah. A Sketch from Indian History" in The Token: A Christmas and New Year's Present, 1831, edited by S.G. Goodrich (Boston, 1831).
- "Original Letters of an Indian Chief" in four parts, in The New-England Galaxy, September–October 1831.
- "The Fortunes of Mendokaycheenah" in The New-England Magazine, Vol. 3, Issue 4, October 1832, pp. 290–296.
- "A Sketch of Indian Character" in The New-England Magazine, Vol. 3, Issue 6, December 1832, pp. 462–470.
- "Shoankah Shahpah, or, The Dirty Dog, a Tale of the Kahpozhahs" in The New-England Magazine, Vol.4, Issue 3, March 1833, pp. 187–195.
- "The Last of the Iron Hearts" in The American Monthly Magazine, New Series, Vol. I, March 1836, pp. 239–244.
- "An Indian Treaty Scene. From the Journal of an Officer." in The American Monthly Magazine, New Series, Vol. I, May 1836, pp. 465–473.
- "Nonona: A Tale of Indian Fortitude" in three parts, in The Morning News, Vol. 1, nos. 74, 75, and 76; December 27, 28, and 29, 1837.
- "Mah-to-khay To-Pah, 'The Four-Bears'. A Tale of the North-West." (also titled "The Last of the Mandans" in The Knickerbocker, Vol. XV, May 1840, pp. 396–412.

==== "Other" short stories ====
- "Falling in Love," in The Amateur, Vol I, No.3 (July 17, 1830), pp. 36–37.
- "The Tea Fiend. A Legend of the Revolution," in The Amateur, in three parts: Vol. 1, no. 3 (July 17, 1830), pp. 33–36; Vol. 1, no 4 (Aug. 7, 1830), pp. 53–56; Vol. 2, no. 5 (Aug. 21, 1830), pp. 69–72.
- "The Pirate" in The Amateur, Vol. I, No. II, (January 1, 1831), pp. 157–160.
- "A Duel, or, Honorable Satisfaction", in The Amateur, Vol.I, No. 13, (January 29, 1831).
- "The Heir of Linn," The [Boston] Morning News, Vol.1, (Oct.6, 1837).
- "Johnny Raw's Journey to Boston," The [Boston] Morning News. Oct. 11, 1837. Re
- "The Royal Family of Staten-Island, by the author of Four Bears, The Mandan" in The Knickerbocker, (July 1840), pp. 52–55.

=== Non-fiction ===
==== Articles ====
- "Character, Manners, Habits and Origin of the Aborigines of North America," comprising Chapter X of Grenville Mellen, ed., A Book of the United States, (New York: H.F. Sumner & Co., 1839) pp. 424–435.
- "American Antiquities," comprising Chapter XI of Grenville Mellen, ed., A Book of the United States, (New York: H.F. Sumner & Co., 1839), pp. 436–444.

==== Autobiographical Sketches ====
- "First Love," The [Boston] Morning News, Oct. 11, 1837.

==== Biographical Sketches ====
- "The Little Crow, aka, The Sparrowhawk; in Dakota, Chaytahn Wawkooah Mahnee," The [Boston] Morning News, Oct. 31, 1837.
- "Sketch of the Life and Public Services of Gen. Lewis Cass," in 5 parts, Boston Herald, 5 June, 6 June, 8 June, 17 June, 24 June 1848, with an addendum titled "Cass and Consistency" 27 June 1848.

==== News/Commentary ====
- "The Late Sioux Treaty," The [Boston] Morning News, Thurs., Oct. 12, 1837, p. 2, col.1.
- "Black Hawk & Keocuck. Indian Deputation," The [Boston] Morning News, in three parts (Oct. 30, Nov.1, Nov. 2, 1837).
- "The Indians," The [Boston] Morning News, Tues, Oct. 31, 1837.
- "The Treacherous Capture of Osceola by Jessup" in the [Boston] Daily Evening News, Monday 14 January 1838, page 2, column I.
- "Osceola" in [New York] Sunday Times, Vol. I, No.13 (Sept 26 or Oct 3, 1841), front page, above the fold.

==== Satire ====
- "A Dialogue Between a Christian and a Jew," Boston Pearl & Literary Gazette, Vol.4, Issue 21 (Jan.31, 1835), pp. 168–169.

=== Poetry ===
- The Birth of Thunder in The Token: A Christmas and New Year's Present, 1831, edited by S.G. Goodrich (Boston, 1831), pp. 177–183; reprinted in William Cullen Bryant, Selections from the American Poets, 1840; reprinted in Rufus Wilmot Griswold, The Poets and Poetry of America: With an Historical Introduction, 1842.
- "The Snow Shoe" in The Token: A Christmas and New Year's Present, 1831, edited by S.G. Goodrich (Boston, 1831).
- "On a Shot Eagle" in the Liberator, 6 August 1831; revised and reprinted as "The Shot Eagle" in the [Boston] Morning News, Vol. 1, Friday, October 6, 1837.
- "The Seven Foresters of Chatsworth," American Monthly Magazine, Vol. 10 (October 1837), p. 369-373.
