= John F. Marszalek =

American historian

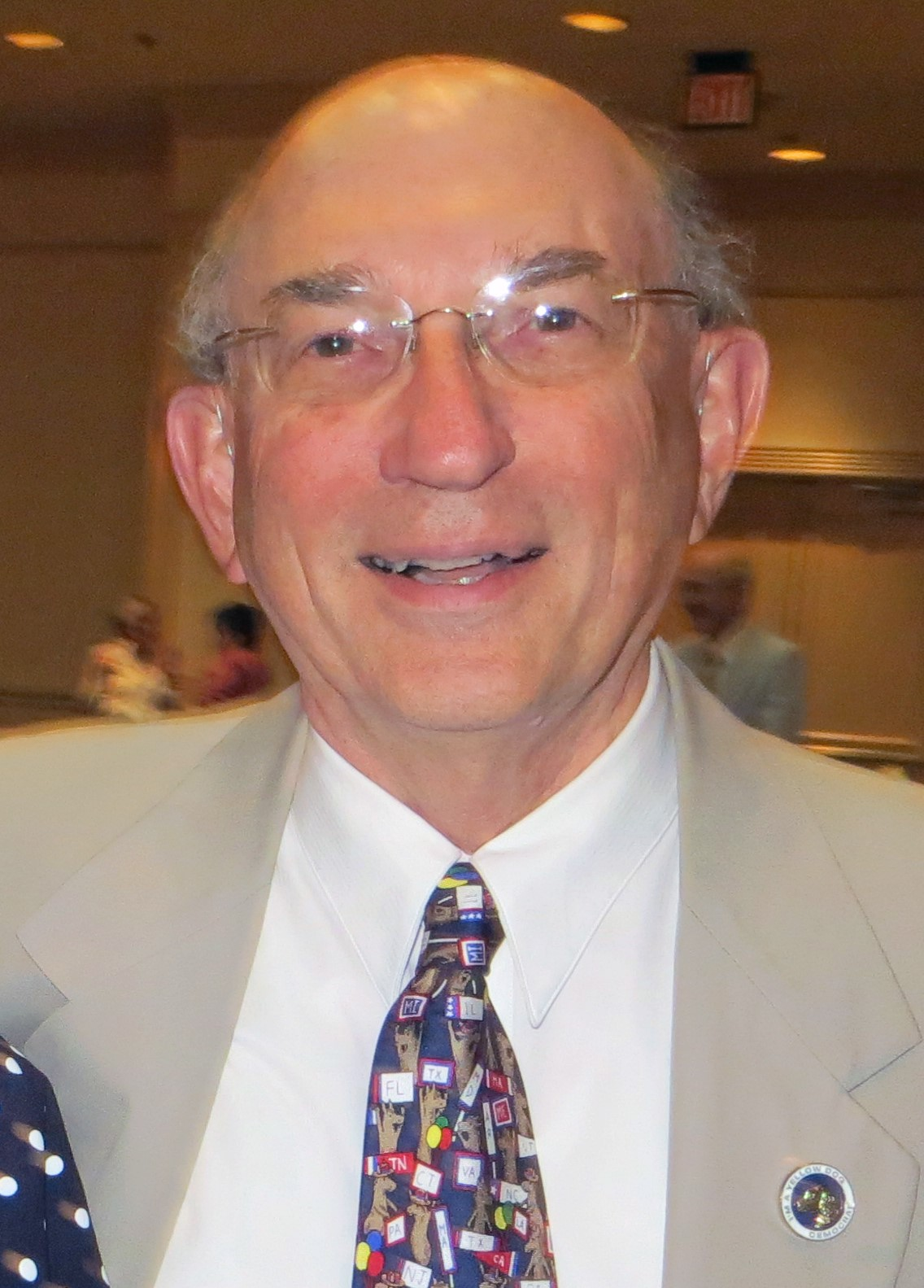
- Marszalek in 2013
- Born: Buffalo, New York, US

Academic background
- Education: Canisius College (BA); University of Notre Dame (MA, PhD)

Academic work
- Discipline: Historian
- Sub-discipline: American Civil War history
- Institutions: Gannon University; Mississippi State University

John F. Marszalek is an American historian who served as Executive Director and Managing Editor of the Ulysses S. Grant Association and The Papers of Ulysses S. Grant project from 2008 to 2022.

== Background and education ==
Marszalek was born in Buffalo, New York. He received his bachelor's degree from Canisius College in 1961. He received a Master's Degree in 1963 and his Ph.D. in 1968, both from the University of Notre Dame.

== Career ==
Marszalek taught at Canisius College and Gannon University before moving to Mississippi State University for the remainder of his career. After 29 years as a professor, Marszalek retired in 2002 to become Professor Emeritus. In 1994 he was appointed the William L. Giles Distinguished Professor. From 1998 to 2012, he served as the Director of the Mississippi State University Distinguished Undergraduate Scholars Program.

=== Ulysses S. Grant Association and Papers of Ulysses S. Grant ===
After John Y. Simon's death in July 2008, Marszalek became the Executive Director and Managing Editor of the Ulysses S. Grant Association and The Papers of Ulysses S. Grant project. He was instrumental in the move of Grant's papers from Southern Illinois University Carbondale to Mississippi State University. With Anne Marshall's appointment as his replacement in 2022, Marszalek was named Executive Director Emeritus of the Ulysses S. Grant Association.

=== Research ===
Over the course of his career, Marszalek has published more than 300 articles and book reviews and written or edited 13 books. His research has primarily focused on the American Civil War, specifically Civil War generals Ulysses S. Grant, William T. Sherman, and Henry Halleck, but he has also written on local Mississippi history, the history of racial conflict at West Point and the Eaton affair.

=== Awards and other achievements ===
Marszalek's book Sherman: A Soldier's Passion for Order was a finalist for the 1993 Lincoln Prize.

The Mississippi Historical Society awarded Marszalek the Richard Wright Literary Award for lifetime achievement by a Mississippi author and the B.L.C. Wailes Award for national distinction in history, the society's highest award.

On April 13, 2018, Marszalek won the Nevins-Freeman Award, the most prestigious honor given by The Civil War Round Table of Chicago.

Showtime made Marszalek's book Court Martial: A Black Man in America, into the motion picture Assault at West Point: The Court-Martial of Johnson Whittaker.

As of 2022, Marszalek serves on the Executive Committee of The Lincoln Forum.

== Publications ==
External videos
- Booknotes interview with Marszalek on The Petticoat Affair, March 8, 1998, C-SPAN
- Presentation by Marszalek on The Petticoat Affair, November 17, 1998, C-SPAN

- Court-Martial: A Black Man in America. New York: Scribner, 1972; subsequently published as Assault at West Point: The Court-Martial of Johnson Whittaker (New York: Collier Books, Macmillan Pub. Co., 1994). Made into a movie.
- (With Sadye Wier) A Black Businessman in White Mississippi, 1886–1974. Jackson: University Press of Mississippi, 1977.
- (Editor) The Diary of Miss Emma Holmes, 1861–1866. Baton Rouge: Louisiana State University Press, 1979.
- Sherman's Other War: The General and the Civil War Press. Memphis State University Press, 1981. Revised ed., The Kent State University Press, 1999.
- (By Douglas L. Conner, M.D., with John Marszalek) A Black Physician's Story: Bringing Hope in Mississippi. Foreword by Aaron Henry. Jackson: University Press of Mississippi, 1985.
- Grover Cleveland: A Bibliography. Westport, CN: Greenwood Press, 1988.
- (Editor with Charles D. Lowery. Encyclopedia of African-American Civil Rights: From Emancipation to the Present. Foreword by David J. Garrow. Westport, CN: Greenwood Press, 1992.
- Sherman: A Soldier's Passion for Order. New York: Free Press, 1993.
- (Co-editor with Wilson D. Miscamble) American Political History: Essays on the State of the Discipline. Notre Dame, Indiana: University of Notre Dame, 1997.
- The Petticoat Affair: Manners, Mutiny, and Sex in Andrew Jackson's White House. New York: Free Press, 1997.
- Sherman's March to the Sea. Abilene, Texas: McWhiney Foundation Press, 2005.
- A Black Congressman in the Age of Jim Crow: South Carolina's George Washington Murray Gainesville, Florida: University of Florida Press, 2006.
- (Coeditor with David S. Nolen and Louie P. Gallo. The Personal Memoirs of Ulysses S. Grant: The Complete Annotated Edition. Cambridge, Massachusetts: Belknap Press of Harvard University Press, 2017.
- (With David S. Nolen, Louie P. Gallo, and Frank J. Williams. Hold On With a Bulldog Grip: A Short Study of Ulysses S. Grant. Jackson, Mississippi: University Press of Mississippi, 2019.
