= Campus of Clemson University =

University site in South Carolina, US

The Campus of Clemson University is located in unincorporated Pickens County, South Carolina, adjacent to Clemson; the U.S. Census Bureau designates the campus as a census-designated place.

This campus was originally the site of U.S. Vice President John C. Calhoun's plantation, named Fort Hill. The plantation passed to his daughter, Anna, and son-in-law, Thomas Green Clemson. On Clemson's death in 1888, he willed the land to the state of South Carolina for the creation of a public university.

The university was founded in 1889, and three buildings from the initial construction still exist today: Hardin Hall (built in 1890), Main Building (later renamed Tillman Hall) (1894), and Godfrey Hall (1898). Other periods of large expansion occurred in 1936–1938, when 8 new buildings constructed, and the late 1950s through 1970, when no fewer than 25 buildings were constructed, most in a similar architectural style.

The campus contains two historic districts listed on the National Register of Historic Places: the Clemson University Historic District I on the northern edge of campus, and the Clemson University Historic District II in the center of campus.

As the university is not in the City of Clemson corporate limits, the university does not have to abide by City of Clemson municipal ordinances nor receive permission to do any undertaking from the City of Clemson. The South Carolina General Assembly designated Clemson University as a "municipal corporation" in 1894.

== Academic buildings ==
Building	Image	Built	Named for	Notes	Coordinates	Ref
Barre Hall		1976	Walter Barre, Professor of Agriculture (1907–1934)	Houses the College of Agriculture, Forestry, and Life Sciences.	34°40′29.3″N 82°50′7.2″W	
Biosystems Research Complex		2004			34°40′27.3″N 82°49′56.3″W	
Brackett Hall		1951 (addition, 1966; renovation, 1992)	Richard Newman Brackett, Professor of Chemistry (1891–1937)	Houses the Political Science, Psychology, and Sociology departments.	34°40′44.3″N 82°50′12.0″W	
Brooks Center for the Performing Arts		1994	Robert Howell Brooks (class of 1960)	House the Department of Performing Arts	34°40′25.6″N 82°50′10.0″W	
Cook Engineering Laboratory		1965	James Clinton Cook, Jr., professor of mechanical engineering, 1948–68		34°40′35.5″N 82°50′15.9″W	
Cooper Library		1966	Robert Muldrow Cooper, life member and president of the Board of Trustees, 1922–66		34°40′35.9″N 82°50′11.2″W	
Daniel Hall		1968	David Wistar Daniel, professor of English, 1898–1947	Houses Communications, English, and Foreign Language departments.	34°40′37.6″N 82°50′6.8″W	
Earle Hall		1959	Samuel Broadus Earle, professor of engineering and President of Clemson Agricultural College 1919, 1924–1925	Houses the department of Chemical Engineering.	34°40′32.7″N 82°50′24.6″W	
Edwards Hall		1977	Robert Cook Edwards (class of 1933), President of Clemson University, 1958–1979	Houses the department of Nursing.	34°40′36.5″N 82°50′2.0″W	
Endocrine Physiology Laboratory					34°40′17.1″N 82°50′5.3″W	
Fluor Daniel Engineering Innovation Building (EIB)		1995	Alumni and friends at the Fluor Daniel Corporation	Houses the Mechanical Engineering department.	34°40′31.4″N 82°50′21.7″W	
Freeman Hall		1926, renovated 1965	Edwin Jones Freeman, professor of industrial engineering, 1924–1961	Houses the department of Industrial Engineering.	34°40′34.1″N 82°50′16.8″W	
Godfrey Hall		1908, renovated 1987	W. E. Godfrey, professor of physics, 1919–1947	Godfrey Hall, originally named the Textile Building, currently serves as classroom and office space for the departments of Education and Graphic Communications. It is a contributing property to the Clemson University Historic District I (NRHP).	34°40′51.1″N 82°50′16.4″W	
Godley-Snell Research Center		1995	W. C. Godley (class of 1943), professor; and Absalom W. Snell (class of 1949), professor	The Godley-Snell Research Center is the university's centralized animal research facility.	34°40′20.0″N 82°49′57.0″W	
Hardin Hall		1890; renovations 1900, 1937, 1946 & 2002	Mark Bernard Hardin, President of Clemson Agricultural College, 1897, 1899, 1902	Hardin Hall is the oldest academic building on campus. It was originally built as the Chemistry laboratory, it was expanded in 1900 and 1937, and has housed the Education department and administration offices. It currently houses the departments of History, Philosophy, and Religion. The building is a contributing property to the Clemson University Historic District II (NRHP).	34°40′41.8″N 82°50′12.9″W	
Holtzendorff Hall		1916	Preston Brooks Holtzendorff, athletic coach and General Secretary of the Clemson YMCA, 1919–1959	Holtzendorff Hall was built as a YMCA building with a grand from John D. Rockefeller. The Italian Renaissance Revival building, designed by Department of Architecture Chairman Rudolph E. Lee, heralded the style of many other early campus buildings. The interior has been extensively renovated, and now houses classrooms and offices for the General Engineering program. It is a contributing property to the Clemson University Historic District I (NRHP).	34°40′53.4″N 82°50′16.0″W	
Hunter Chemistry Laboratory		1987	Howard L. Hunter, professor of chemistry and dean, 1928–1969	Houses the department of Chemistry.	34°40′34.9″N 82°50′21.8″W	
Jordan Hall		1974	Frank Marshall Jordan (class of 1902) and his wife, Evelyn V. Jordan		34°40′38.6″N 82°50′4.0″W	
Kinard Laboratory of Physics		1961	Francis Marion Kinard, professor of English and dean, 1924–60	Houses the Physics department.	34°40′39.0″N 82°50′6.8″W	
Lee Hall		1958; addition 1968	Rudolph E. Lee (class of 1896), Professor of Drawing & Design, 1898–1948; Head of the Architecture Department, 1933–48; architect of many campus buildings	Houses the Architecture department. Listed on the National Register of Historic Places.	34°40′27.9″N 82°50′18.8″W	
Lehotsky Hall		1975	Koloman Lehotsky, professor of forestry and dean, 1956–69	Houses the departments of Forestry; Parks, Recreation, and Tourism Management; and Wildlife & Fisheries Biology.	34°40′26.2″N 82°50′6.7″W	
Long Hall		1937	William Williams Long, director of Cooperative Extension Service, 1914–34	Long Hall was originally constructed for the Agriculture department. It was built on the former site of the university's cooperative extension service. It was designed in an Italianate style by Rudolph E. Lee. It is currently the home of the Biology department. The buildings is a contributing property to the Clemson University Historic District I (NRHP).	34°40′40.9″N 82°50′4.3″W	
Lowry Hall		1958	Walter L. Lowry, Jr., professor and dean, College of Engineering, 1949–61	Houses the Civil Engineering department. Listed on the National Register of Historic Places.	34°40′31.4″N 82°50′17.4″W	
Martin Hall		1962	Samuel Maner Martin, Professor of Mathematics, 1898–1948	Houses the Mathematics department.	34°40′41.6″N 82°50′8.2″W	
McAdams Hall		1950; renovations & additions: 1976, 2004	William N. McAdams (class of 1938), professor of agricultural engineering, 1939–59	Houses the Computer Science and Agricultural Sciences departments.	34°40′32.0″N 82°50′4.2″W	
Newman Hall		1959	J. S. Newman, professor of agriculture, 1892–1905; and Charles Carter Newman (class of 1898), professor of horticulture, 1899–1946	Houses the Packaging Science department.	34°40′28.6″N 82°50′0.5″W	
Olin Hall		1953	Franklin W. Olin, founder of the Olin Foundation	Houses the Ceramic and Materials Engineering department.	34°40′39.6″N 82°50′13.2″W	
Poole Agricultural Center (P&A Building)		1955	Robert Franklin Poole, President of Clemson Agricultural College, 1940–58	Houses the College of Agriculture, Forestry, and Life Sciences.	34°40′25.8″N 82°50′3.1″W	
Rhodes Engineering Research Center		1968, annex 2009	Samuel R. Rhodes (class of 1907), first editor of The Tiger, Head of Electrical Engineering Dept., 1933–1954	Houses the Bioengineering department.	34°40′35.1″N 82°50′14.7″W	
Riggs Hall		1928	Walter Merritt Riggs, President of Clemson Agricultural College, 1910–24; professor of mechanical engineering and athletic coach, 1896–1909	Riggs Hall was built to replace Mechanical Hall, which burned in 1926. It was designed by Architecture department chairman Rudolph E. Lee. The departments of Architecture, Civil Engineering, Electrical Engineering, and Mechanical Engineering were the first tenants. Architecture and Civil Engineering moved into the new Structural Science Building in 1958, but Electrical and Mechanical Engineering are still located in the building. It is a contributing property to the Clemson University Historic District II (NRHP).	34°40′37.2″N 82°50′16.4″W	
Sirrine Hall		1938; renovated, 1978	Joseph E. Sirrine, life trustee of Clemson Agricultural College, 1928–47	Sirrine Hall was built to replace Godfrey Hall as the Textile building. It was one of 8 buildings built between 1936 and 1938, and designed by Rudolph E. Lee in an Italian Renaissance Revival style. The building housed the College of Business until the 2020–2021 school year. It is a contributing property to the Clemson University Historic District II (NRHP).	34°40′37.4″N 82°50′21.5″W	
Harris A. Smith Building		2009	Harris A. Smith	Houses the Sonoco Institute of Packaging Design and Graphics	34°40′29.1″N 82°50′21.2″W	
Wilbur O. and Ann Powers College of Business (WAP Building)		2020	Wilbur O. and Ann Powers	Houses the College of Business	34°40′49.1″N 82°50′4.9″W	
Tillman Hall		1892	Benjamin Ryan Tillman, Governor of South Carolina, 1890–95; United States Senator, 1895–1918; life trustee of Clemson Agricultural College, 1888–1918	Tillman Hall is the university's clock tower and signature building. It was designed by Atlanta architects Bruce & Morgan, also responsible for other university buildings around the South. The building featured the first library, many classrooms and laboratories, and a chapel. Originally known as the Main Building, it was named for Trustee Tillman by the board of trustees in July 1946. Today, it houses the Education department and an auditorium. Along with Godfrey Hall and Hardin Hall, it is one of the few remaining buildings from the first phase of construction on campus. It is a contributing property to the Clemson University Historic District I (NRHP).	34°40′48.6″N 82°50′15.2″W	

== Administrative buildings ==
Building	Image	Built	Named for	Notes	Coordinates	Ref
Class of 1944 Alumni Center		1972	Class of 1944	The Alumni Center was a donation of the Class of 1944, and currently houses the visitors center and offices.	34°40′53.8″N 82°50′7.1″W	
Mell Hall		1940	Patrick Hues Mell, Jr., President of Clemson Agricultural College, 1902–10	Mell Hall was built as a post office to serve the university and the town of Clemson. After separate post offices were built in 1973, the building became part of the university. Today, it houses offices for the university housing department. It is a contributing property to the Clemson University Historic District I (NRHP).	34°40′55.1″N 82°50′15.5″W	
Strode Tower		1969	Henry Aubrey Strode, first President of Clemson Agricultural College, 1890–93	Houses offices for the English, Foreign Language, and Communication departments.	34°40′36.5″N 82°50′6.2″W	
Sikes Hall		1904, rebuilt after fire, 1927	Enoch Walter Sikes, President of Clemson Agricultural College, 1925–40	Sikes Hall was built when the Agriculture department outgrew its space in Tillman Hall. Situated at the original entrance to John C. Calhoun's Fort Hill Plantation, the building was designed by Rudolph E. Lee, and modeled after the Library of Congress Building. After a fire in 1924, it was remodeled into a library. Today, Sikes is the main administration building. It is a contributing property to the Clemson University Historic District I (NRHP).	34°40′45.6″N 82°50′6.7″W	

== Residential buildings ==
=== Bryan Mall, "The Horseshoe" ===
Building	Image	Built	Named for	Notes	Coordinates	Ref
Barnett Hall		1965	W. D. Barnett (class of 1910), Trustee, 1920–32 and 1935–40; president of alumni association, 1934–36	Originally named "East Campus Dormitory #2".	34°40′40.9″N 82°49′57.3″W	
Byrnes Hall		1970	James F. Byrnes, U.S. Supreme Court Justice, 1941–42; Secretary of State, 1945–47; Governor of South Carolina, 1951–55; Life Trustee, 1941–72		34°40′38.7″N 82°49′52.7″W	
Lever Hall		1968	Asbury Francis Lever, Life Trustee, 1913–40		34°40′36.9″N 82°49′53.8″W	
Manning Hall		1967	Richard I. Manning III, Governor of South Carolina, 1915–19; Life Trustee, 1909–31		34°40′37.8″N 82°49′56.3″W	
Mauldin Hall		1963	William H. Mauldin, Trustee, 1894–1900; and Ivy M. Mauldin, Trustee, 1906–27	Originally named "East Campus Dormitory #1".	34°40′40.5″N 82°49′59.4″W	
Smith Hall		1972	Winchester C. Smith, Jr., Life Trustee, 1954–72	Originally named "East Campus Dormitory #3".	34°40′41.3″N 82°49′55.1″W	

=== The Shoeboxes ===
Building	Image	Built	Named for	Notes	Coordinates	Ref
Benet Hall		1962	Christie Benet, Life Trustee, 1929–51		34°40′38.9″N 82°50′24.7″W	
Cope Hall		1965	Frank Elmo Cope, Trustee, 1926–56		34°40′42.0″N 82°50′24.2″W	
Geer Hall		1966	Bennett Eugene Geer, Trustee, 1922–28		34°40′41.5″N 82°50′26.3″W	
Sanders Hall		1966	Paul Sanders, Trustee, 1926–60		34°40′39.9″N 82°50′26.5″W	
Young Hall		1962	T. B. Young, Life Trustee, 1932–60		34°40′40.5″N 82°50′24.6″W	

=== Fraternity/Sorority Quad ===
Building	Image	Built	Named for	Notes	Coordinates	Ref
Bowen Hall		1936; renovation 2005	R. E. Bowen, Trustee, 1898–1909	Originally named Barracks #4.	34°40′50.2″N 82°50′19.7″W	
Bradley Hall		1936; renovation 2005	J. E. Bradley, Trustee, 1888–1907	Originally named Barracks #5.	34°40′50.4″N 82°50′21.8″W	
Donaldson Hall		1936; renovation 2005	Milton Lafayette Donaldson, Trustee, 1888–1924	Originally named Barracks #6.	34°40′51.7″N 82°50′19.5″W	
Norris Hall		1939; renovation 2005	Daniel Keating Norris, Trustee, 1888–1905	Originally named Barracks #8.	34°40′49.3″N 82°50′20.9″W	
Simpson Hall		2005			34°40′50.8″N 82°50′18.3″W	
Wannamaker Hall		1936; renovation 2005	J. E. Wannamaker, Life Trustee, 1888–1935	Originally named Barracks #7.	34°40′52.0″N 82°50′21.5″W	

=== On-campus apartments ===
Building	Image	Built	Named for	Notes	Coordinates	Ref
Calhoun Courts		1982	Patrick Noble Calhoun (class of 1932), Life Trustee, 1966–76		34°40′39.4″N 82°49′45.7″W	
Lightsey Bridge I		1992	Edward Oswald Lightsey, Trustee, 1963–77		34°40′26.0″N 82°49′42.9″W	
Lightsey Bridge II		2001	Edward Oswald Lightsey, Trustee, 1963–77		34°40′30.3″N 82°49′37.0″W	
Thornhill Village		unknown	T. Wilbur Thornhill, Trustee, 1947–60		34°40′41.0″N 82°49′35.2″W	

=== Others ===
Building	Image	Built	Named for	Notes	Coordinates	Ref
Clemson House		1950	Thomas Green Clemson	Originally a hotel, now a residence hall featuring suites & apartments, as well as a dining hall. Closed May 2016 in order to be demolished and replaced by the CORE Campus Project. The building was demolished in December 2017.	34°40′51.5″N 82°50′2.6″W	
Holmes Hall		1994	Lewis D. Holmes, Trustee, 1960–73		34°40′43.8″N 82°50′20.7″W	
Johnstone Hall A		1954	Alan Johnstone, Trustee, 1890–1929; President of the Board of Trustees, 1907–1929		34°40′48.0″N 82°50′16.9″W	
McCabe Hall		1994	W. Gordon McCabe, Jr., Trustee, 1960–78		34°40′43.7″N 82°50′17.9″W	
Stadium Residence Hall		2002	Its location overlooking Memorial Stadium		34°40′42.1″N 82°50′28.4″W	
CORE Campus		2016	Its location in the center of campus	668 bed housing facility across 3 buildings. Bottom floor contains a 900-seat dining hall and a 300-seat dining center. The dining center contains food shops such as Starbucks and Which Wich.	34°40′45.4296″N 82°50′22.4340″W	
Douthit Hills		2018	Joe B. Douthit Jr., Trustee, 1936–56		34°40′50.25″N 82°49′45.8292″W	

=== Dining halls & Unions ===
Building	Image	Built	Named for	Notes	Coordinates	Ref
Edgar A. Brown University Union		1976	Edgar Allan Brown, South Carolina state senator, life trustee and president of the Board of Trustees, 1934–75		34°40′45.5″N 82°50′17.4″W	
Fernow Street Cafe		1992			34°40′35.8″N 82°50′17.1″W	
Harcombe Hall		1954; renovated, 1993	Capt. J. D. Harcombe, mess officer, c. 1924	Replaced by dining hall in CORE Campus building.	34°40′46.9″N 82°50′18.9″W	
Hendrix Student Center		2000	Leon James Hendrix, Jr. (class of 1963, MS 1968)	WSBF-FM	34°40′33.8″N 82°49′55.1″W	
Schilletter Dining Hall		1968	August Schilletter, Steward of Clemson College; in charge of kitchens & mess hall, 1900–1918		34°40′36.9″N 82°49′58.3″W	

== Athletic & recreation buildings ==
Building	Image	Built	Named for	Notes	Coordinates	Ref
Doug Kingsmore Stadium		1970	Doug Kingsmore, former Clemson baseball player and Trustee Emeritus	Baseball stadium; capacity of 5,617, record crowd of 6,480.	34°40′44.7″N 82°50′57.2″W	
Fike Recreation Center		1940, renovated 2002	Rupert Howard Fike (class of 1908), physician and founder of IPTAY	Student recreation center	34°40′50.5″N 82°50′31.0″W	
Jervey Athletic Center		1973, renovated 1995	Frank Johnstone Jervey (class of 1914), life trustee, 1965–1975; vice president for development	Houses the Volleyball teams, athletic offices, and training facilities	34°40′44.8″N 82°50′53.2″W	
Littlejohn Coliseum		1968; renovated 2003, 2016	James C. Littlejohn, registrar and business manager, 1908–1954	Basketball arena; capacity of 10,325. Also hosts graduation ceremonies and occasional concerts.	34°40′49.6″N 82°50′47.2″W	
McFadden Building		1995	Banks McFadden, Class of 1940; Clemson's first All-American, in 1939, in both football and basketball; Clemson's first entry in the College Football Hall of Fame in 1959; head basketball coach 1947–1956		34°40′47.5″N 82°50′53.6″W	
Memorial Stadium		1942, Enlarged: 1958, 1960, 1978, & 2003	The field is named in honor of Frank Howard, head football coach and athletic director, 1940–1969	Football stadium; capacity of 82,000; nicknamed "Death Valley"	34°40′43.4″N 82°50′35.5″W	
Rock Norman Track & Field Complex		2003 (indoor facility)	Rock Norman, track & field coach 1940–57		34°40′25.2″N 82°51′1.1″W	
Rowing Boathouse				Boathouse for the women's rowing team overlooking Lake Hartwell	34°40′38.0″N 82°51′17.6″W	
Riggs Field		1915, renovated for soccer 1987	Walter Merritt Riggs, President of Clemson Agricultural College, 1910–24; professor of mechanical engineering and athletic coach, 1896–1909	Soccer stadium. Hosted the football team from 1915 to 1941, opened for soccer in 1987. Hosted the NCAA Men's Division I Soccer Championship finals in 1987. Capacity of 6,500.	34°40′54.5″N 82°50′19.9″W	
Sloan Tennis Center		1985 (outdoor); 1987 (indoor)	Hoke A. Sloan, local Clemson merchant and longtime volunteer tennis coach	Tennis center featuring 21 outdoor courts and 4 indoor courts.	34°40′55.4″N 82°50′25.9″W	
Vickery Hall		1991	Kenneth N. Vickery (class of 1938), registrar and dean, 1955–1982; president of the Atlantic Coast Conference, 1976–77	Houses athletic tutoring.	34°40′38.4″N 82°50′1.9″W	
Walker Golf Course		1995	John E. Walker, Sr.	Home of the varsity golf team, as well as the Golf Management and Turfgrass academic programs	34°40′8.2″N 82°50′4.6″W	

== Other facilities ==
Building	Image	Built	Named for	Notes	Coordinates	Ref
Bowman Field		1900	R.T.V. Bowman, instructor and coach	Bowman Field was originally used as drill, marching, and parade grounds, and the location for commencement and military commissions during the school's years as a military college. It was also the home of the football and baseball teams before the construction of Riggs Field in 1916.	34°40′51.1″N 82°50′12.0″W	
Calhoun Mansion		1803, expanded 1830	U.S. Vice-President, senator, and Secretary of State John C. Calhoun	John C. Calhoun purchased the plantation and house in 1825. It was passed to his daughter, Anna, and son-in-law Thomas Green Clemson. Clemson willed the land to the state to be used for a public university. The house was listed as a National Historic Landmark in 1960.	34°40′40.6″N 82°50′20.2″W	
Campbell Museum of Natural History		1894, remodeled 1936 & 1996	Bob Campbell (class of 1937), Trustee; and his wife Besty		34°40′39.6″N 82°50′5.1″W	
Carillon Garden		1993		Given as a gift of the Class of 1943 to honor those members killed in World War II.	34°40′45.8″N 82°50′9.4″W	
Dillard Building		1956	Frank Dillard, Superintendent of Laundry	Houses the SC Institute of Energy Studies' Energy Systems Laboratory	34°40′43.9″N 82°50′25.5″W	
Hanover House (Clemson)		1716	Hanover House is a colonial house built by a French Huguenot family in 1714–1716, on the upper Cooper River in present-day Berkeley County.	Since the house was due to be flooded in filling Lake Moultrie, it was moved to Clemson in the 1960s. It now serves as a museum. Listed on the National Register of Historic Places.	34°40′30.6″N 82°49′4.3″W	
Clyde V. Madren Center & James F. Martin Inn		1995	Clyde V. Madren, benefactor; and James F. Martin, class of 1964		34°39′54.7″N 82°50′35.3″W	
Outdoor Theater		1940	Class of 1915	The Outdoor Theater was built as a gift of the Class of 1915, and designed by one of its members and the university's first architecture graduate, Leon LeGrand. It was built in cooperation with the Work Projects Administration. The Art Deco stage was nearly demolished and replaced in 1977, but protests prompted its renovation and the addition of concrete terraced seating. It is a contributing property to the Clemson University Historic District II (NRHP).	34°40′41.7″N 82°50′10.0″W	
President's Home		1959			34°40′42.3″N 82°49′51.3″W	
President's Park		1923		President's Park stretches along S.C. 93 from Sikes Hall to the President's House. A rotunda, donated by and named for the Class of 1957, was erected in 2009.	34°40′42.3″N 82°49′51.3″W	
Redfern Health Center		1969	Alexander M. Redfern, MD, college surgeon, 1893–1920		34°40′32.3″N 82°50′0.9″W	
Sears House		1928	Sears, Roebuck and Co.	Originally the W.W. Long residence.	34°40′48.7″N 82°49′36.3″W	
Barnes Center		1915		Listed on the National Register of Historic Places.	34°40′36.3″N 82°49′49.4″W	
Strom Thurmond Institute		1989	J. Strom Thurmond (class of 1923), Governor of South Carolina, 1947–51; United States Senator, 1955–2002		34°40′31.0″N 82°50′12.5″W	
Trustee House		c. 1894	Its use by visiting trustees	The Trustee House was originally the home of Chemistry department chairman Mark B. Hardin. After his death, the board of trustees used it for meetings, and visiting dignitaries stayed in the house. It is a contributing property to the Clemson University Historic District II (NRHP).	34°40′42.3″N 82°50′17.1″W	
Class of 1944 Visitors Center		1997	Class of 1944	Named for the 1944 alumni class, most of whom served in World War II.	34°40′53.3″N 82°50′6.4″W	
