= Clemson University Historic District =

Clemson University Historic District may refer to:

- Clemson University Historic District I, on the northern edge of campus
- Clemson University Historic District II, in the central campus
