= Sikes Sit-In =

The Sikes Sit-In was a peaceful sit-in protest at Clemson University, located within and in front of Sikes Hall, an administrative building on campus. The protest began on April 13, 2016, when a sign commemorating African American history at Fort Hill, the plantation house that Clemson's campus is built around, was defaced with racist iconography. Protesters were allowed to remain in the building on the first night, but on April 14, 2016, five students, referred to by news outlets as the Clemson Five, were arrested by campus police for remaining in the building after hours. Richard Balhs, Director of the University's Student Board, released a note demanding the release of the Clemson Five. The protest was closely affiliated with the See the Stripes campaign, which advocated for racial equality on campus, an undoing of the university's controversial historical narrative, and the renaming of several buildings on campus, including the controversial Tillman Hall, named after white supremacist Democratic governor Benjamin Tillman.
