= Riggs Field House =

Gymnasium in Clemson, South Carolina

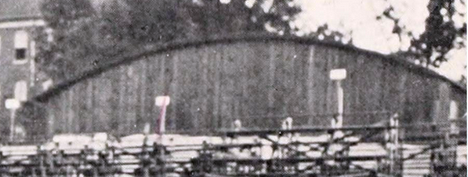
- Interactive map of Riggs Field House
- Location: Clemson, South Carolina
- Coordinates: 34°40′48″N 82°50′17″W
- Capacity: 1,000

Construction
- Groundbreaking: 1921
- Opened: January 13, 1922
- Closed: 1929

Riggs Field House was a gymnasium in Clemson, South Carolina. It served as the home court of the Clemson Tigers basketball and boxing teams, and hosted campus social events. It was built in 1922 as a replacement for the YMCA Building on a hill overlooking Riggs Field, then the home of the football and baseball teams, behind Barracks No.1 and Tillman Hall.

The site was cleared in the fall of 1921 by Clemson cadets, and the building constructed over the winter of 1921–22. The field house contained a full-sized basketball court, unlike the one in the YMCA building, and was used by other athletic teams for practice. The gym opened on January 13, 1922, with a 24–16 loss to Georgia.

The basketball team moved into the newly constructed Clemson Field House (now Fike Recreation Center) in 1930. Riggs Field House was demolished to make way for new barracks, today known as the "Frat Quad": Bowen, Bradley, Donaldson, Norris, and Wannamaker Halls.
