= 1956 United States Senate election in South Carolina =

- November 6, 1956
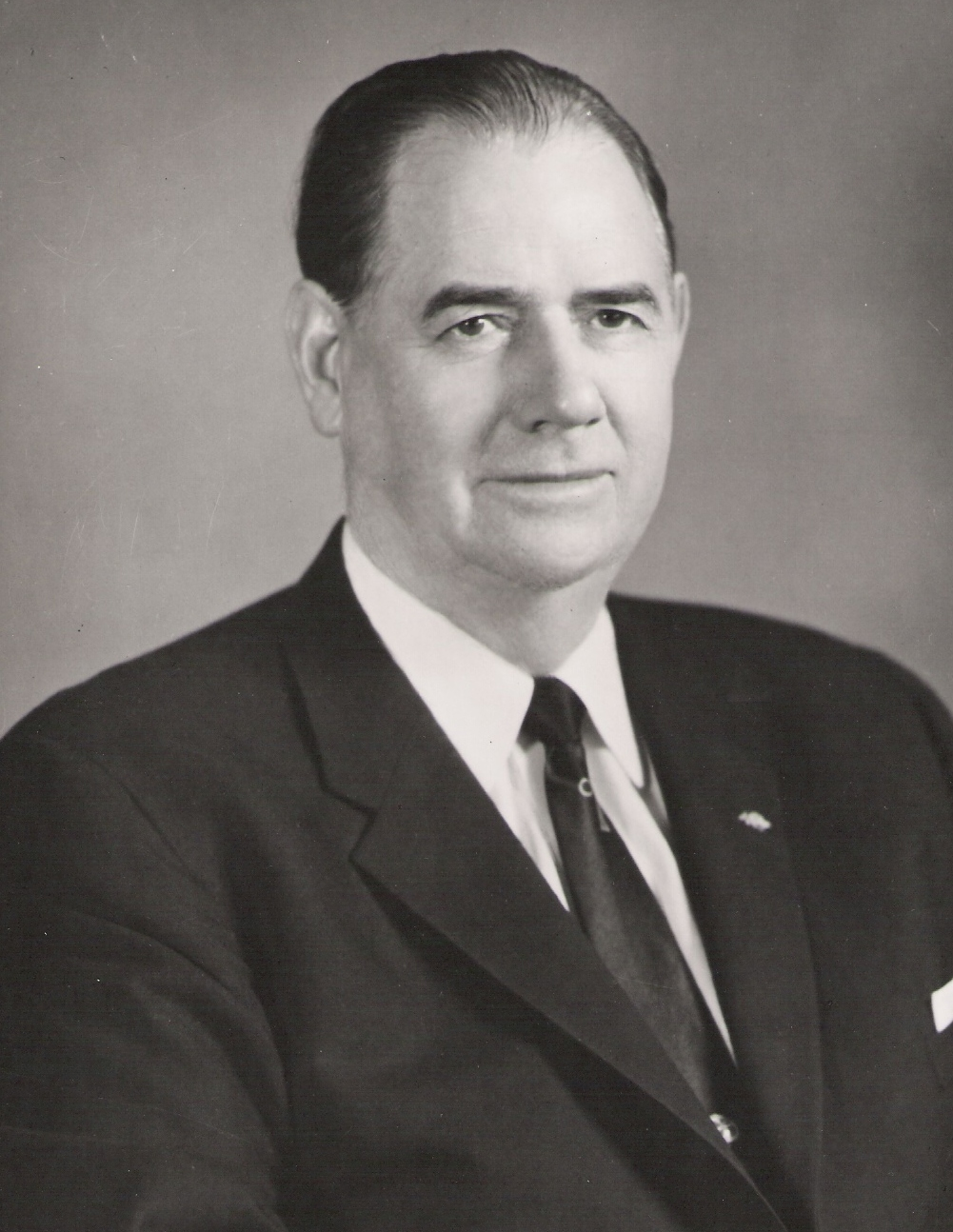

Nominee	Olin D. Johnston	Leon P. Crawford
Party	Democratic	Republican
Popular vote	230,150	49,695
Percentage	82.21%	17.75%
- County results Johnston: 50–60% 60–70% 70–80% 80–90% >90%
U.S. senator before election
Olin D. Johnston
Democratic
Elected U.S. Senator
Olin D. Johnston
Democratic

The 1956 South Carolina United States Senate election was held on November 6, 1956, to select the U.S. Senator from the state of South Carolina simultaneously with the special Senate election. Incumbent Democratic Senator Olin D. Johnston handily defeated Republican mayor of Clemson Leon P. Crawford.

== Democratic primary ==
Olin D. Johnston, the incumbent Senator, faced no opposition from South Carolina Democrats and avoided a primary election.

== Republican primary ==
Leon P. Crawford, the mayor of the town of Clemson in the Upstate, faced no opposition from South Carolina Republicans and avoided a primary election.

== General election campaign ==
Crawford campaigned as a defender of states' rights and denounced Johnston for backing the New Deal and the Fair Deal. The state Republican Party believed that Crawford could have a chance in the election if he galvanized the 128,000 registered black voters, although they were weary of being labeled as the black party. In the end, Johnston remained highly popular with the voters who were still leery of the Republican party and he easily defeated Crawford in the general election.

== Election results ==
South Carolina U.S. Senate Election, 1956
Party	Candidate	Votes	%	±%
Democratic	Olin D. Johnston (incumbent)	230,150	82.21%	−17.72%
Republican	Leon P. Crawford	49,695	17.75%	N/A
No party	Write-Ins	124	0.04%	N/A
Majority		180,455	64.46%	−35.39%
Turnout		279,969	36.8	
Democratic hold				

== See also ==
- List of United States senators from South Carolina
- 1956 United States Senate elections
- 1956 United States Senate special election in South Carolina
