= Jerry Carter =

Jerry Carter may refer to:

- Jerry Carter (North Carolina politician) (1955–2021)
- Jerry Carter (South Carolina politician) (born 1952)
