= Leon P. Crawford =

American politician (1890–1975)

Mayor of Clemson
- In office June 1946 – January 1965
- Succeeded by: George H. Dunkelberg

Personal details
- Born: April 9, 1890 Hayesville, North Carolina, U.S.
- Died: April 8, 1975 (aged 84) Clemson, South Carolina, U.S.
- Resting place: Old Stone Church and Cemetery
- Political party: Republican
- Spouse: Ann Tiger
- Children: 6

Leon Polk Crawford (April 9, 1890 – April 8, 1975) was an American politician who served as mayor of Clemson, South Carolina. He is credited for being the only Republican to hold elective office in South Carolina during the Solid South until the 1960s. He ran for United States Senator in 1956, but lost to Olin B. Johnston.

== Early life ==
Crawford was born on April 9, 1890, in Hayesville, North Carolina, the son of Millard Crawford and Sarah Lenora Barnard. He attended school at Hiawasee Junior College. In 1932, his first job was serving as Clemson's city clerk. Before he was elected mayor, Crawford led a movement to rename the town, then named Calhoun, to Clemson. In 1943, the change was approved 10–1.

== Political career ==
In June 1946, he was elected mayor of Clemson, South Carolina. At the time, Clemson was incorporated with a population less than 1,000. He served for eighteen years, until January 1965. Several of his accomplishments include the establishment of the first water and sewer departments, and a $400,000 sewer program, one of the first in the town. In 1956, he mounted an unsuccessful campaign, losing to Olin B. Johnston. Crawford netted around 18% of the vote.

== Personal life ==
He eloped and married his wife Ann Tiger. They had six children. He died on April 8, 1975, in Clemson, aged 84, a day shy of his 85th birthday. He is buried at Old Stone Church Cemetery.

== Electoral history ==
South Carolina U.S. Senate Election, 1956
Party	Candidate	Votes	%	±%
Democratic	Olin D. Johnston (incumbent)	230,150	82.21%	−17.72%
Republican	Leon P. Crawford	49,695	17.75%	N/A
No party	Write-Ins	124	0.04%	N/A
Majority		180,455	64.46%	−35.39%
Turnout		279,969	36.8	
Democratic hold				
