= Senator Sykes =

Senator Sykes may refer to:

- Anthony Sykes (born 1972), Oklahoma State Senate
- Dinah Sykes (born 1977), Kansas State Senate
- James Sykes (Continental Congress) (1725–1792), Delaware State Senate
- James Sykes (governor) (1761–1822), Delaware State Senate
- Vernon Sykes (born 1951), Ohio State Senate

== See also ==
- E. Walter Sikes (1868–1941), North Carolina State Senate
