= Samuel Broadus Earle =

American academic

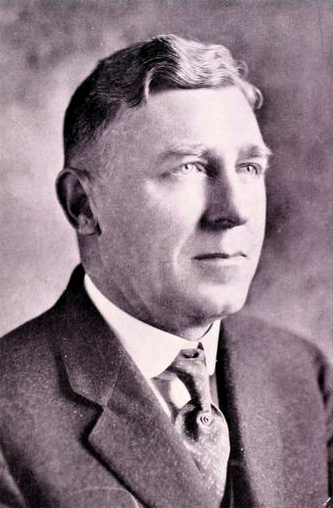
- Earle in 1924
- Born: March 11, 1878; Gowensville, South Carolina, U.S.
- Died: May 10, 1978 (aged 100); Clemson, South Carolina, U.S.
- Burial place: Woodland Cemetery, Clemson, South Carolina
- Education: Furman University (BA 1898, MA 1899); Cornell University (MEng 1902)
- Occupation: Professor
- Known for: Acting President of Clemson College, 1919, 1924–1925

Samuel Broadus Earle (March 11, 1878 – May 10, 1978) was an American engineering professor who served as acting president of Clemson College (now University) in 1919 and from 1924 to 1925.

Earle was born in 1878 in Gowensville, South Carolina, to a Baptist minister. He was able to attend Furman University at a discount, and earned a bachelor's degree in 1898 and a master's degree in 1899. He then attended Cornell University, receiving a master's degree in engineering in 1902. Earle turned down offers from General Electric and Westinghouse to take a teaching position at Clemson College. He was promoted to professor and director of the engineering department in 1910 when Walter Riggs became president of the college.

In 1919, Riggs was chosen to serve as a director of the Army's overseas educational commission in France for six months, and Riggs chose Earle to be acting president during his absence. Earle was again tapped to be acting president after Riggs' sudden death in 1924. Though his first stint as acting president was quiet, Earle's second term began with a walkout of almost a quarter of the cadets, citing substandard food and exacerbated by the dismissal of the senior class president on suspicion of consuming alcohol. The walkout lasted two days, but led to 23 students dismissed, 112 suspended, and 36 withdrawals. In April 1925, the Agricultural Hall was destroyed by fire, with Earle and the faculty deciding to reconstruct the building for use as a new library. Three months later, new president E. Walter Sikes arrived on campus, and Earle resumed his duties as engineering department head.

Earle's position was renamed Dean of the school of engineering in 1932, and he held that title until his retirement in 1950. In 1959, the new chemical engineering building was named in his honor. Earle died in 1978, and was buried in Woodland Cemetery, on the college's campus.

== Works cited ==
- Duffy, Susan (1998). "The Conservative Caretaker: Samuel Broadus Earle, 1919 and 1924–1925". In McKale, Donald M.; Reel Jr., Jerome V. (eds.). Tradition: A History of the Presidency of Clemson University (2nd ed.). Macon, Georgia: Mercer University Press. pp. 127–138. ISBN 9780865542969.
