= Andersonville, South Carolina =

Human settlement in United States of America

Andersonville
- Ghost town
- Location within South Carolina Location within the United States
- Coordinates: 34.4473260°N 82.8551407°W
- United States of America: South Carolina
- Established: 1800
- Elevation: 656 ft (200 m)

Population
  - Total: 0
- Site inundated by Hartwell Lake

Andersonville was a town in Anderson County, South Carolina, that was settled around 1800. It was named for Robert Anderson, who was a Revolutionary War veteran. Although it had been a thriving textile and trading community, it suffered from repeated floods and was bypassed by the railroad. The construction of Lake Hartwell displaced the remnants of the community. Today the nearest incorporated communities are Hartwell, Georgia, across the lake to the southwest, and Anderson, South Carolina, to the North.

== History ==
The town of Andersonville was settled at the fork of the Seneca River and the Tugaloo River. In 1801, the South Carolina General Assembly established the town. The town was named for Robert Anderson, who was one of the commissioners that laid out the community.

The town grew as a trading and textile center. The Southern Clock Company and textile mills were built in the town. In 1840, a flood struck the community and destroyed the textile mills. The textile mills were rebuilt, but they were destroyed by another flood in 1852.

The railroads bypassed Andersonville. As rail traffic overtook the river traffic, the town lost its industry and many residents. The Andersonville post office was closed in 1893.

The area was largely flooded in the construction of Lake Hartwell. Most of those buried at the cemetery were moved to Andersonville Baptist Church on the eastern shore of the lake. Andersonville Island, which is a narrow island about two miles long, is all that remains of the community.
