= Clemson College Sheep Barn =

- U.S. National Register of Historic Places
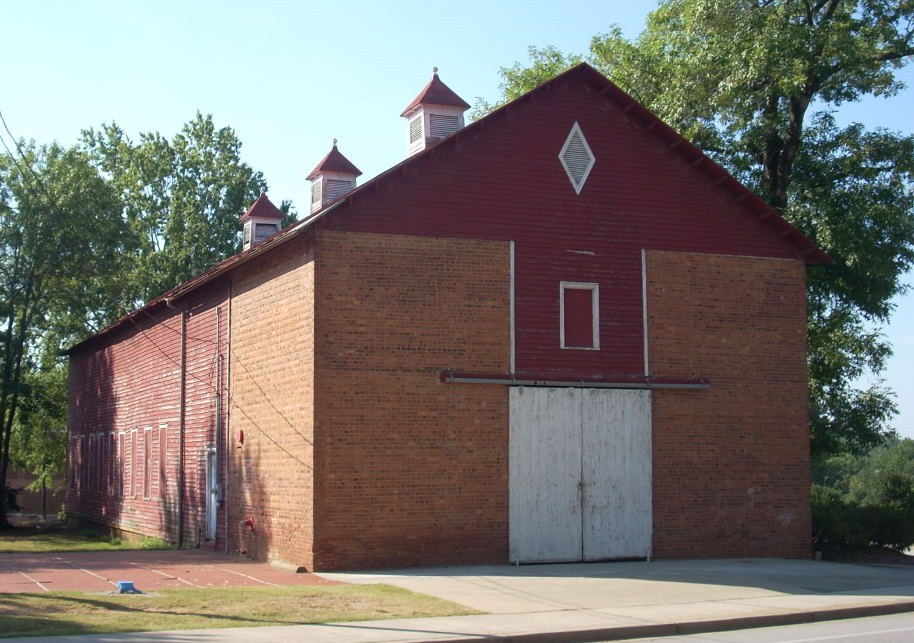
- Clemson College Sheep Barn

- Location within South Carolina Location within the United States
- Location: S. Palmetto Blvd., Clemson University campus, Clemson, South Carolina
- Coordinates: 34°40′36″N 82°49′50″W
- Area: less than one acre
- Built: 1915
- MPS: [Clemson University MPS]
- NRHP reference No.: 89002140
- Added to NRHP: January 4, 1990

The Clemson College Sheep Barn (Barnes Center) is a two-story barn built in 1915 on the Clemson University campus. It is the oldest surviving building associated with agriculture on this land-grant university. It was named to the National Register of Historic Places on January 4, 1990.

== History ==
The Barnes Center began as the Clemson College Experimental Barn or ‘Sheep Barn.’ The barn is the oldest surviving and relatively intact structure associated with the original Clemson College Agricultural Department and was built in approximately 1904.

The barn was extremely significant from 1904 to 1940 when it was used for agricultural exploration and experimentation. During this time, livestock practices were changing in order to prevent diseases, improve hygiene, and to increase productivity. The barn was created in order to support these goals as an agricultural education facility that investigated scientific problems that directly affected the advancement of agriculture.

The barn began by researching the handling and care of cows, but became retrofitted to research sheep. As recently as 1935, the barn was used for hands on class instruction including determining wool quality and sheep judging. Some of the equipment remained intact within the structure until construction on The Barnes Center began. The barn was listed in The James Way Plan Book as a research participant. In 1940, the agricultural operations ceased and then the barn has been used for storage. On January 4, 1990, the building was listed on the National Register of Historic Places in recognition of its significance.

In 2014, the Barnes Family gave a gift to Clemson University and the Sheep Barn became the Barnes Center. The Barnes Center is the social destination of campus where students can come make friends, relax, and attend late-night programming every Thursday, Friday, and Saturday night. The Barnes Center Grand Opening was February 18, 2017.

== Architecture ==
The barn is a rectangular building about two stories tall on a brick foundation. It has a standing-seam metal, gabled roof. The roof has three square, vented cupolas with metal roofing and ball finials. The facade and about 15 feet (5 m) of the side elevations are constructed of clay brick. This native clay brick was laid in English bond. The brick is similar to that used for the Trustee House, which is a contributing property to the Clemson University Historic District II, and the Campbell Museum of Natural History, which was originally called the Kinard Annex, on the Clemson campus. The facade has a wooden sliding door on a metal track. Above this door, there is a weatherboarded section with a window for the hayloft. The gable is weatherboard with a louvered lozenge, which appears as a decoration on several other Clemson agricultural buildings. The rear elevation's original door was replaced with a garage door. Most of the sides are weatherboarded. The northeast elevation has a single door, another doorway covered with weatherboard, and nine window openings that have been covered with vertical boards. The southeast elevation has about ten window openings covered similarly. Additional pictures of the barn are available.

Following a remodel starting in 2014, The Barnes Center now has space for dining, activities, and more. It now has white siding, refurbished floors and sliding door, and original brick. The building is also outfitted with modern amenities such as WiFi, televisions, and modern light fixtures. Additional information and construction timeline can be found on the Barnes Center website.
