= Walker Golf Course =

Golf course in Clemson, South Carolina

Walker Course
- Interactive map of Walker Course
- 34°40′3″N 82°50′29″W

Club information
- Location: Clemson, South Carolina
- Established: 1995
- Type: Semi-private
- Owner: Clemson University
- Tota holes: 18
- Website: clemson.edu/centers-institutes/madren/golf/
- Designed by: D. J. DeVictor
- Par: 72
- Length: 6,911 yards
- Course rating: 72.8

The John E. Walker Sr. Golf Course (often referred to as the Walker Course) is an 18-hole golf course on the campus of Clemson University in South Carolina. Its signature 17th green and bunkers echo the university's tiger paw logo.

It is a stop on the Pier-Flats CAT Bus route.

In 2012, the Professional Golfers' Association of America ranked the Walker Course as the 9th best university golf course in the United States.
