= Robert Anderson (Revolutionary War) =

American politician (1741–1813)

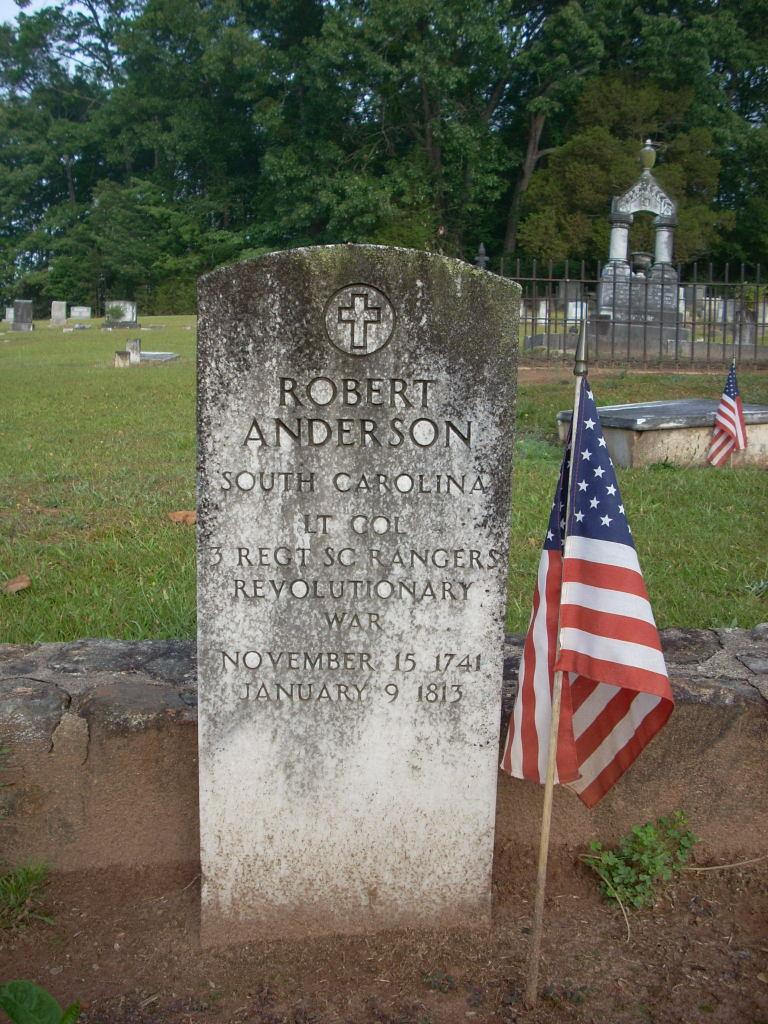
- Robert Anderson's grave marker at Old Stone Church cemetery
- Born: November 15, 1741; Augusta County, Colony of Virginia, British America
- Died: January 9, 1813 (aged 71); Oconee County, South Carolina, U.S.
- Occupations: Militia officer and surveyor
- Spouse: Anne Thompson (m. 1765)
- Children: 5

Robert Anderson (November 15, 1741 – January 9, 1813) was a politician, militia officer, and surveyor from South Carolina. He was a lifelong friend of General Andrew Pickens. Anderson, South Carolina, Anderson County, South Carolina, and the ghost town of Andersonville are named for him.

== Early life ==
He was born on November 15, 1741, in Augusta County, Virginia. His parents were John and Jane Anderson, Presbyterian immigrants who had immigrated to Virginia from the town of Ballymena in County Antrim, Ireland (in what is today Northern Ireland.)

== Marriage and children ==
He married Anne Thompson in 1765. They moved to South Carolina and settled near his friend from Virginia, Andrew Pickens. She died after twenty-five years of marriage. They had five children:

- Robert, Jr., married Maria Thomas.
- Anne married Dr. William Hunter.
- Mary (1766–1810) married Robert Maxwell (1753–1797), a Revolutionary War hero, was appointed as sheriff of the Greenville District. He lived in Greenville County and was killed by an ambush on November 10, 1797, while he was crossing the Saluda River shoals, where Piedmont Mill Dam was later built. His grave is fifteen miles south of Greenville, near Ware Place.
- Jane Anderson (b. 12 June 1775) married William Shaw.
- Elizabeth married Samuel Maverick. One child was Samuel Maverick.

In 1793, Anderson married a second time, to Lydia Maverick, a widow in Pendleton, South Carolina. Her son, Samuel, married Robert's daughter Elizabeth.

After the death of his second wife, he married Mrs. Reese. She was the widow of Dr. Thomas Reese, who was the pastor of Old Stone Church.

== Military service ==
In the American Revolutionary War, he joined the Fifth South Carolina Militia. He became a captain in the regiment commanded by his friend Andrew Pickens when they fought Boyd's Loyalists.

Anderson was one of the Patriots who gave their parole to the British as Ninety Six, South Carolina. Many took up arms after the British had disregarded their promises.

At the Battle of Cowpens, Anderson was a colonel under Brigadier General Andrew Pickens. Anderson also served under Henry "Light Horse Harry" Lee. He fought in the Battle of Eutaw Springs in which the British were victorious. Later, his regiment held the line against the British between Augusta, Georgia, and Ninety Six.

On the western frontier, he fought with Andrew Pickens against the Cherokees. A treaty signed in 1777 ceded most of the Cherokee lands in the present Anderson, Oconee, and Pickens counties.

After the war, Anderson served as a brigadier-general in the state militia.

== Political career ==
He served in the South Carolina House of Representatives from 1791 to 1794 and from 1801 to 1802 from the Pendleton District. He was an elder of the Old Stone Church. In 1800, he was elector for Thomas Jefferson and Aaron Burr.

He owned 2,100 acres (8 km^{2}) in the current Anderson, Oconee, and Pickens Counties including his home, Westville, on the west side of the Seneca River across from Andrew Pickens' home, Hopewell.

== Death and legacy ==
He died at his home on January 9, 1813. A flood prevented his burial at Old Stone Church, and he was buried on his estate. During the construction of Lake Hartwell, his body was reinterred at Old Stone Church.

The ghost town of Andersonville, the City of Anderson, and Anderson County were named for him.

== Sources ==
- Louise Ayer Vandiver, Traditions and History of Anderson County, Ruralist Press, Atlanta, GA, 1928.
- Frank A. Dickson, Journeys into the Past: The Anderson's Region's Heritage, Sponsored by the Anderson County Bicentennial Committee, 1975.
- Marks, Paula Mitchell (1989), Turn Your Eyes Toward Texas: Pioneers Sam and Mary Maverick, Centennial Series of the Association of Former Students, Texas A&M University, Number 30, College Station, Texas: Texas A&M University Press, ISBN 0-89096-380-0
- Reynolds, Jr., William R. (2012). Andrew Pickens: South Carolina Patriot in the Revolutionary War. Jefferson NC: McFarland & Company, Inc. ISBN 978-0-7864-6694-8.

Political offices
Preceded by Lewis Morris	Lieutenant Governor of South Carolina; 1796–1798	Succeeded by John Drayton
