= Old Stone Church and Cemetery =

Historic site in South Carolina, United States

- U.S. National Register of Historic Places
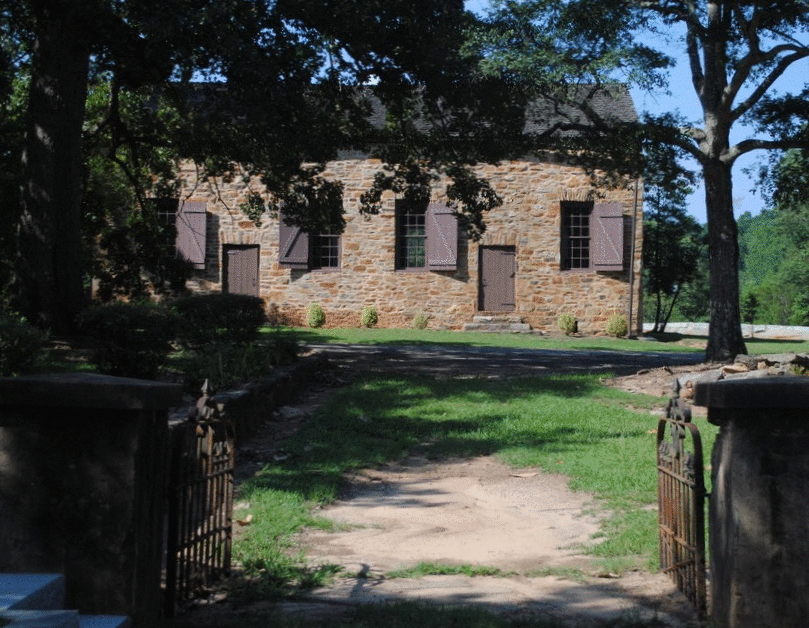
- View of the Old Stone Church from the cemetery
- Location: Clemson, South Carolina
- Coordinates: 34°39′52″N 82°48′55″W
- Built: 1797 - 1802
- Architect: John Rusk
- Part of: Pendleton Historic District (ID70000560)
- NRHP reference No.: 71000794
- Added to NRHP: November 5, 1971

Old Stone Church is a church building built in 1802. When it was constructed, it was in the Pendleton District, South Carolina. When Pendleton District was divided in 1826, the church was in Pickens District. When Pickens District was split in 1868, it was in Oconee County, South Carolina. In 1968, this section of Oconee County was annexed back to Pickens County. The church is about midway between the centers of Pendleton and Clemson. It is now in the city limits of Clemson.

== History ==
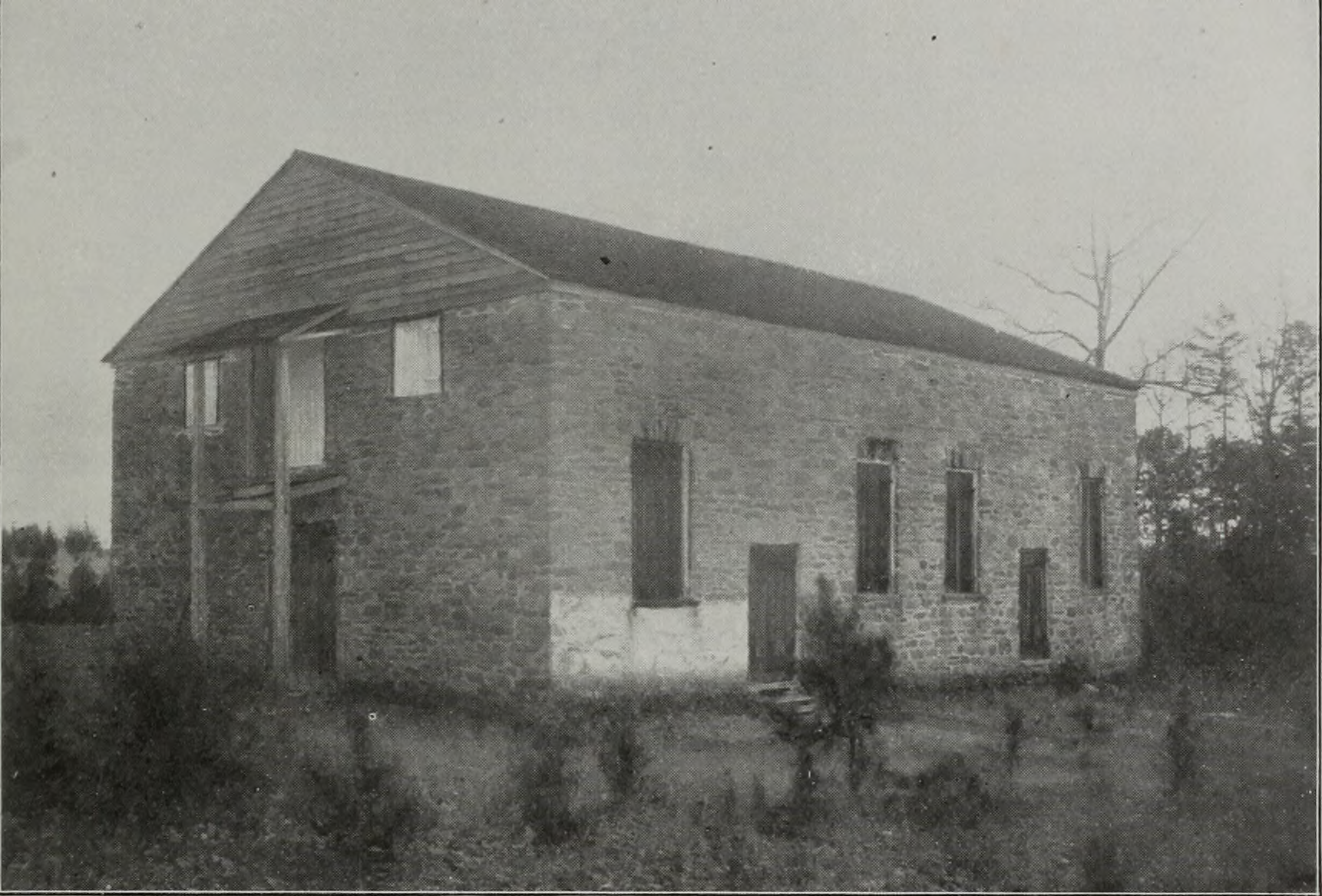
Old Stone Church in 1901.

In 1790, the Hopewell Presbyterian Church, which was also called the Hopewell-Keowee Church, was built in the Pickens District. Hopewell was the name of General Andrew Pickens's house on the Seneca River. Keowee was a common name for this section of the Seneca River in this period. The first church was a log building. Its location is on South Experimental Forest of Clemson University in Pickens County on Seed Orchard Road about 200 m west of West Queen St. This church burned in 1796. The ruins can be found at the edge of the forest. A monument was on the site until 1980 when it was moved to inside of Old Stone Church to prevent vandalism.

The congregation was given a tract of land for the new church by John Miller, who was a printer in Pendleton. Miller had been a publisher in England. In 1775, he and two partners were tried for libel because of their publications of the Junius letters in the London Evening Post. They were found not guilty. In 1782, Miller came to Philadelphia, Pennsylvania. In 1783, he moved to Charleston, South Carolina and began publishing a newspaper, Pendleton Messenger. After the Treaty of Hopewell, he was given 640 acres (259 ha) on Eighteen Mile Creek near Pendleton by Governor Benjamin Guerard. He or his son later deeded about 16.9 acres (6.8 ha) to the Trustees of Hopewell Church.

The new church was constructed of field stone and mortar by John Rusk, who was the father of Texas Senator Thomas Jefferson Rusk, over the period from 1797 to 1802. It was a simple building with wooden pews and a pulpit. Early members of the church included Robert Anderson and Andrew Pickens.

In 1824, the congregation built a new church, Hopewell-Pendleton, in Pendleton. After the new church was built, The Old Stone Church was only used occasionally. The congregation in Pendleton is now known as the Pendleton Presbyterian Church.

The Old Stone Church and Cemetery is on the National Register of Historic Places, No. 71000794. The South Carolina Department of Archives and History has additional pictures and information, and copies of the nomination forms.

== Notable burials ==
- Robert Anderson, American Revolutionary War colonel
- Leon P. Crawford, Republican mayor of Clemson from 1946 to 1965
- Andrew Pickens, American Revolutionary War Brigadier general and member of the United States House of Representatives
- Rebecca Calhoun Pickens, wife of Andrew Pickens and cousin of John C. Calhoun
- John Miller, London printer
- Reverend Thomas Reese
