= 1956 United States Senate special election in South Carolina =

- November 6, 1956
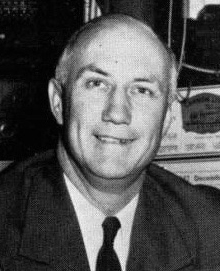
Nominee	Strom Thurmond
Party	Democratic
Popular vote	245,371
Percentage	100.00%
- County results Thurmond: 90–100%
U.S. senator before election
Thomas A. Wofford
Democratic
Elected U.S. Senator
Strom Thurmond
Democratic

The 1956 South Carolina United States Senate special election was held on November 6, 1956, to select the U.S. Senator from the state of South Carolina simultaneously with the regular Senate election. The election resulted from the resignation of Senator Strom Thurmond on April 4, 1956, who was keeping a campaign pledge he had made in the 1954 election. Thurmond was unopposed in his bid to complete the remaining four years of the term, which, alongside a concurrent election in Georgia, is currently the last time a non-incumbent was unopposed for a United States Senate election. Thurmond would remain as Senator for nearly fifty years until he retired in 2003.

== Democratic primary ==
Senator Strom Thurmond faced no opposition from South Carolina Democrats and avoided a primary election. There was a possibility that Governor George Bell Timmerman Jr. might enter the race, but Thurmond was held in such high regard by the voters that there would have been no chance of defeating him. With no challenge to the remainder of the term, Thurmond did not conduct a campaign and rejoined his old law firm in Aiken until he returned to the Senate after the special election.

== Election results ==
South Carolina U.S. Senate Special Election, 1956
Party	Candidate	Votes	%	±%
Democratic	Strom Thurmond	245,371	100.00%	+36.9
Majority		245,371	100.00%	+73.7
Turnout		245,371	32.2	+5.9
Democratic hold				

== See also ==
- List of United States senators from South Carolina
- 1956 United States Senate elections
- 1956 United States Senate election in South Carolina
