= Jerry Carter (South Carolina politician) =

American politician

Member of the South Carolina House of Representatives from the 3rd district
- In office November 9, 2020 – November 2024
- Preceded by: Gary Clary
- Succeeded by: Phillip Bowers

Personal details
- Born: April 10, 1952 (age 74) Raleigh, North Carolina, U.S.
- Party: Republican
- Spouse: Karen Baker
- Education: Atlantic Christian College (BA)

Jerry T. Carter (born April 10, 1952) is an American politician. He was a member of the South Carolina House of Representatives from the 3rd District, serving from 2020 to 2024.. He is a member of the Republican party.

== Electoral history ==
In his 2020 run for the South Carolina House of Representatives, Carter received endorsements from the Conservation Voters of South Carolina, the South Carolina Fund for Children, Pickens County sheriff Rick Clark, and Clemson mayor J.C. Cook III, among others.

In 2024 he was defeated by Phillip Bowers.
