= Clemson University Historic District I =

Historic district in South Carolina, United States

- U.S. National Register of Historic Places
- U.S. Historic district
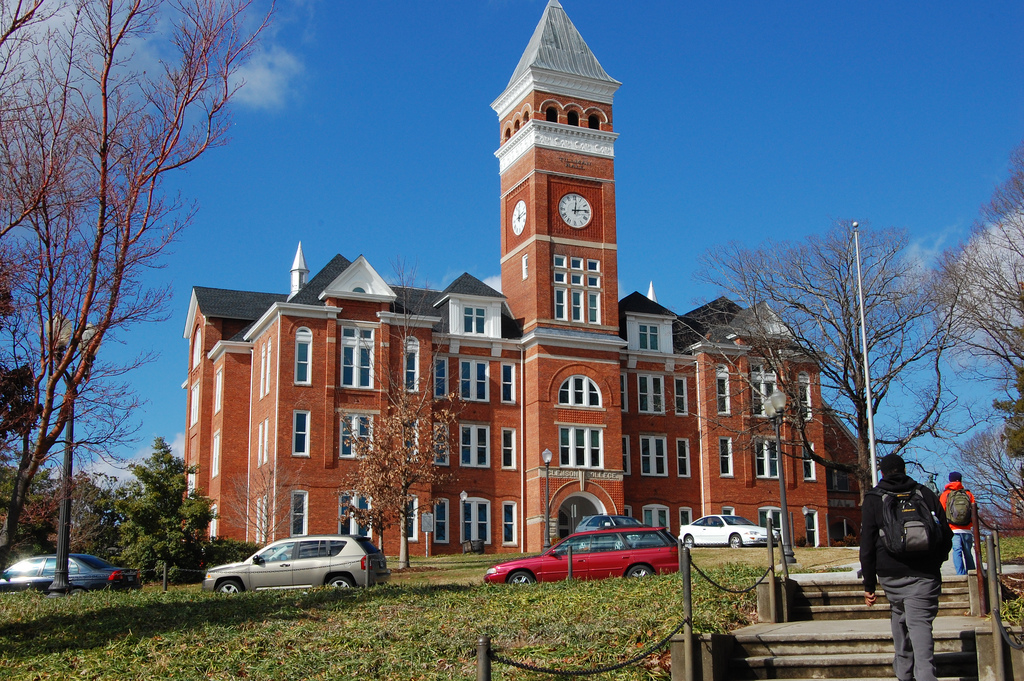
- Tillman Hall in 2008

- Location within South Carolina Location within the United States
- Location: Northern portion of campus along US 76, Clemson, South Carolina
- Coordinates: 34°40′47″N 82°50′4″W
- Area: 40.9 acres (16.6 ha)
- Built: 1893–1939
- Architect: Rudolph E. Lee; Bruce & Morgan
- Architectural style: Late 19th and 20th Century Revivals, Late Victorian
- MPS: Clemson University MPS
- NRHP reference No.: 89002138
- Added to NRHP: January 4, 1990

The Clemson University Historic District I is a collection of historic properties on the campus of Clemson University in Clemson, South Carolina. The district contains eight contributing properties located along the northern portion of the campus. Included are some of the oldest academic buildings on campus. It was listed on the National Register of Historic Places in 1990.

== Contributing properties ==
Property	Photo	Built	Location	Notes
Bowman Field		1900	34°40′51.1″N 82°50′12.0″W	Bowman Field was originally used as drill, marching, and parade grounds, and the location for commencement and military commissions during the school's years as a military college. It was also the home of the football and baseball teams before the construction of Riggs Field in 1916. It is named for R.T.V. Bowman, an instructor and coach.
Godfrey Hall		1898	34°40′51.1″N 82°50′16.4″W	Godfrey Hall, originally named the Textile Building, was once used as a Tuberculosis Hospital. Godfrey was renovated in 1987 and currently serves as classroom and laboratory space for the department of Graphic Communications.
Holtzendorff Hall		1916	34°40′53.4″N 82°50′16.0″W	Holtzendorff Hall was built as a YMCA building with a grant from John D. Rockefeller. The Italian Renaissance Revival building, designed by Department of Architecture Chairman Rudolph E. Lee, heralded the style of many other early campus buildings. The interior has been extensively renovated, and now houses classrooms and offices for the General Engineering program.
Long Hall		1937	34°40′40.9″N 82°50′4.3″W	Long Hall was originally constructed for the Agriculture department. It was built on the site of the university's cooperative extension service. It was designed in an Italianate style by Rudolph E. Lee. It is currently the home of the Biology department.
Mell Hall		1939	34°40′55.1″N 82°50′15.5″W	Mell Hall was built as a post office to serve the university and the town of Clemson. After separate post offices were built in 1973, the building became part of the university. Today, it houses offices for the University Housing department.
President's Park		circa 1925	34°40′44.6″N 82°49′58.2″W	President's Park, which was originally Trustees Park, stretches along S.C. 93 from Sikes Hall to the President's House. A rotunda, donated by and named for the Class of 1957, was erected in 2009.
Sikes Hall		1905	34°40′45.6″N 82°50′6.7″W	Sikes Hall was built when the Agriculture department outgrew its space in Tillman Hall. Situated at the original entrance to John C. Calhoun's Fort Hill Plantation, the building was designed by Rudolph E. Lee, and modeled after the Library of Congress Building. After a fire in 1924, it was remodeled into a library. Today, Sikes is the main administration building.
Tillman Hall at Clemson University		1893	34°40′48.6″N 82°50′15.2″W	Tillman Hall is the university's clock tower and signature building. It was designed by Atlanta architects Bruce & Morgan, also responsible for other university buildings around the South. The building featured the first library, many classrooms and laboratories, and a chapel. Today, it houses the Education department and an auditorium. Along with Godfrey Hall and Hardin Hall, it is one of the few remaining buildings from the first phase of construction on campus.

== See also ==
- Clemson University Historic District II
- Campus of Clemson University
