= Phillip Bowers =

American politician

Member of the South Carolina House of Representatives from the 3rd district
- Incumbent
- Assumed office November 11, 2024
- Preceded by: Jerry Carter

Personal details
- Party: Republican

Phillip Bowers is an American politician. He is a member of the South Carolina House of Representatives from the 3rd District, serving since 2024. He is a member of the Republican party.

== Early life and career ==
Bowers is a lifelong resident of Six Mile, South Carolina, and is self-employed in Project Management.

== Electoral history ==
Bowers filed to challenge incumbent Jerry Carter in the 2024 Republican primary. Bowers defeated the incumbent in the primary.

Bowers went on to defeat Democratic candidate Eunice Lehmacher in the general election.

Bowers serves on the House Education and Public Works and the Legislative Oversight committees.

Before election to the State legislature in 2024, Bowers, served on the Pickens County School Board, the State Board of Education and Education Oversight Committee and as chairman of the Pickens County Republican Party.
