= Lee and Lowry Hall =

- Structural Science Building
- U.S. National Register of Historic Places
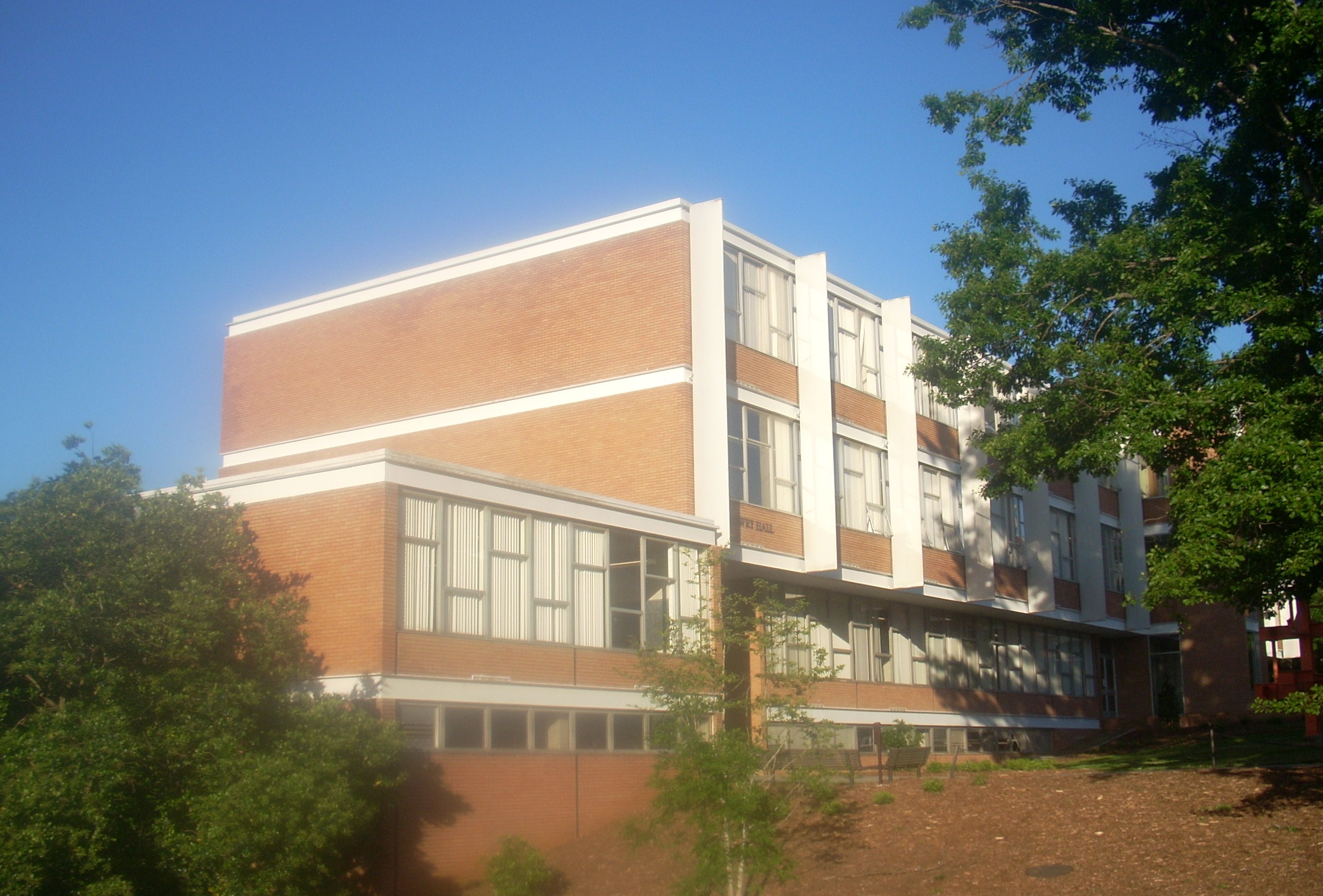
- Lowry Hall, April 2010

- Location within South Carolina Location within the United States
- Location: Clemson University, Clemson, South Carolina
- Coordinates: 34°40′31″N 82°50′18″W
- Area: 4.1 acres (1.7 ha)
- Built: 1957
- Built by: Lockwood, Green and Company
- Architect: Harlan E. McClure
- Architectural style: Modern Movement, International Style
- MPS: Clemson University MPS
- NRHP reference No.: 09000365
- Added to NRHP: April 5, 2010

Lee and Lowry Hall, originally known as the Structural Science Building, is a historic academic building located on the campus of Clemson University, Clemson, Pickens County, South Carolina. It was designed by Harlan Ewart McClure, Dean of the College of Architecture, and completed in 1958. It consists of three building elements that enclose two courtyards: the Civil Engineering Wing, the Mechanical Engineering Laboratories, and the Architecture Wing. The buildings are in the International Style.

It was listed on the National Register of Historic Places in 2010.
