= Clemson University Historic District II =

Historic district in South Carolina, United States

- U.S. National Register of Historic Places
- U.S. Historic district
- Location within South Carolina Location within the United States
- Location: Center of campus, Clemson, South Carolina
- Coordinates: 34°40′40″N 82°50′18″W
- Area: 15 acres (6.1 ha)
- Built: 1803–1940
- Architect: Rudolph E. Lee
- Architectural style: Renaissance Revival, Queen Anne, Art Deco
- MPS: Clemson University MPS
- NRHP reference No.: 89002139
- Added to NRHP: January 4, 1990

The Clemson University Historic District II is a collection of historic properties on the campus of Clemson University in Clemson, South Carolina. The district contains 7 contributing properties located in the central portion of the campus. It was listed on the National Register of Historic Places in 1990.

== Contributing properties ==
| Building | Photo | Built | Location | Notes |
|---|---|---|---|---|
| John C. Calhoun Office | | circa 1825 | 34°40′39.5″N 82°50′20.3″W | John C. Calhoun's office on the premises of his Fort Hill estate served as his private library. Its Greek Revival style echoes that of the main house. |
| Fort Hill | | circa 1803 | 34°40′40.6″N 82°50′20.2″W | John C. Calhoun purchased the plantation & house in 1825. It was passed to his daughter, Anna, and son-in-law Thomas Green Clemson. Clemson willed the land to the State to be used for a public university. It was individually listed as a National Historic Landmark in 1960. |
| Hardin Hall | | 1890 | 34°40′41.8″N 82°50′12.9″W | Hardin Hall is the oldest academic building on campus. It was originally built as the Chemistry laboratory, it was expanded in 1900 and 1937, and has housed the Education department and administration offices. It currently houses the departments of History, Philosophy, and Religion. |
| Outdoor Theater | | 1940 | 34°40′41.7″N 82°50′10.0″W | The Outdoor Theater was built as a gift of the Class of 1915, and designed by one of its members and the university's first architecture graduate, Leon LeGrand. The Art Deco stage was nearly demolished and replaced in 1977, but protests prompted its renovation and the addition of concrete terraced seating. |
| Riggs Hall | | 1927 | 34°40′37.2″N 82°50′16.4″W | Riggs Hall was built to replace Mechanical Hall, which burned in 1926. It was designed by Architecture department chairman Rudolph E. Lee. The departments of Architecture, Civil Engineering, Electrical Engineering, and Mechanical Engineering were the first tenants. Architecture and Civil Engineering moved into the new Structural Science Building in 1958 while Mechanical Engineering moved to the Fluor Building in 1995, but Electrical and Computer Engineering are still located in the building. |
| Sirrine Hall | | 1938 | 34°40′37.4″N 82°50′21.5″W | Sirrine Hall was built to replace Godfrey Hall as the Textile building. It was one of 8 buildings built between 1936 and 1938, and designed by Rudolph E. Lee in an Italian Renaissance Revival style. The building housed the College of Business until 2020, upon the completion of the Wilbur O. and Ann Powers College of Business Building. |
| Trustee House | | 1904 | 34°40′42.3″N 82°50′17.1″W | The Trustee House was originally the home of Chemistry department chairman Mark B. Hardin. After his death, the Board of Trustees used it for meetings, and visiting dignitaries stayed in the house. |

== See also ==
- Clemson University Historic District I
- Campus of Clemson University
