= E. Walter Sikes =

American politician

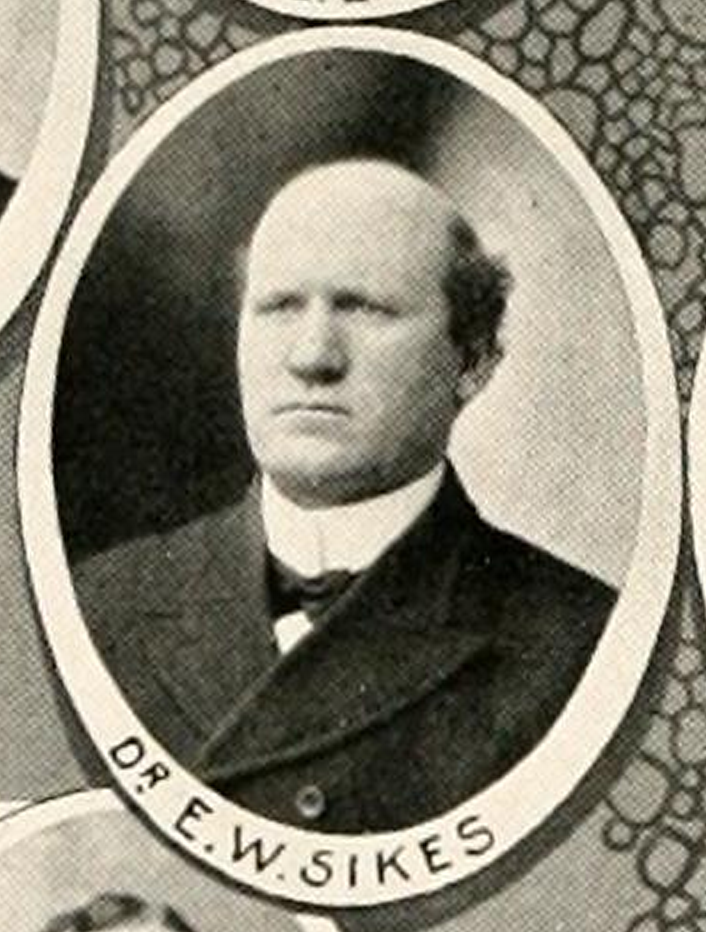
- Sikes pictured in Howler 1903, Wake Forest yearbook

Biographical details
- Born: May 19, 1868; Union County, North Carolina, U.S.
- Died: January 8, 1941 (aged 72); Clemson, South Carolina, U.S.

Playing career
- 1889–1892: Wake Forest
- Position: Guard

Coaching career (HC unless noted)
- 1891–1893: Wake Forest

Head coaching record
- Overall: 6–2–1

Enoch Walter Sikes (May 19, 1868 – January 8, 1941) was an American college football player and coach, professor, state senator, and university president. He served as the head football coach at Wake Forest University from 1891 to 1893, compiling a record of 6–2–1. Sikes taught history and political economics at Wake Forest from 1897 to 1916. He served one term in the North Carolina Senate, representing Wake County in 1911. Sikes was the president of Coker College from 1916 to 1925 and the president of Clemson University from 1925 until his retirement in 1940 He died of a heart attack on January 8, 1941, in Clemson, South Carolina.

== Head coaching record ==
Year	Team	Overall	Conference	Standing	Bowl/playoffs
Wake Forest Baptists (Independent) (1891–1893)
1891	Wake Forest	1–0			
1892	Wake Forest	4–0–1			
1893	Wake Forest	1–2			
Wake Forest:		6–2–1			
Total:		6–2–1			
