= R. T. V. Bowman =

American sports coach (1875–1899)

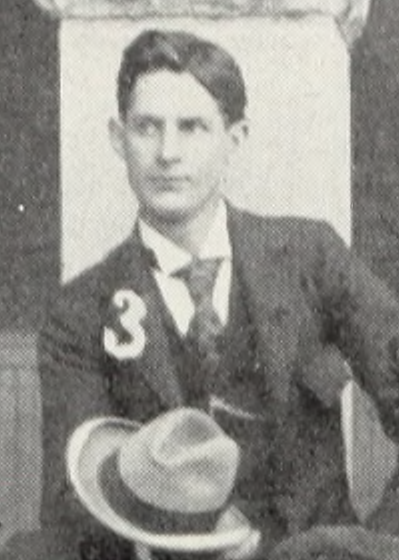

Biographical details
- Born: August 1, 1875
- Died: April 14, 1899 (aged 23); Charlottesville, Virginia, U.S.

Coaching career (HC unless noted)
- 1896, 1898: Clemson

Head coaching record
- Overall: 2–6

Randolph T. V. Bowman (August 1, 1875 – April 14, 1899) was an instructor in forge and foundry at Clemson Agricultural College of South Carolina from February 1895 to April 1899, just after the college opened in 1893. He was best known for his association with college athletics, despite his own weak constitution, serving as the first baseball coach and one of the first assistant football coaches. He coached the very first intercollegiate match played at Clemson, a baseball game with Furman University on April 24, 1896, which the Tigers lost 13–20.

Bowman died in April 1899 at his home in Charlottesville, Virginia. He had apparently suffered from ill-health from his early years, and a tribute by President Henry Simms Hartzog noted that "Though physically unable to take any considerable part in athletics, he helped [...] by his counsel and presence." Just before his death, Bowman finished carving the commemorative plaques for Professor Henry Aubrey Strode, Clemson College's first president, and Professor W. L. McGee, now displayed in Tillman Auditorium. Bowman Field, Clemson's "front lawn", is named in his honor: Bowman is said to have personally cleared the former sedge field of rocks and other detritus so that it could be used as an athletics ground.
