= Tillman Hall at Clemson University =

Tillman Hall
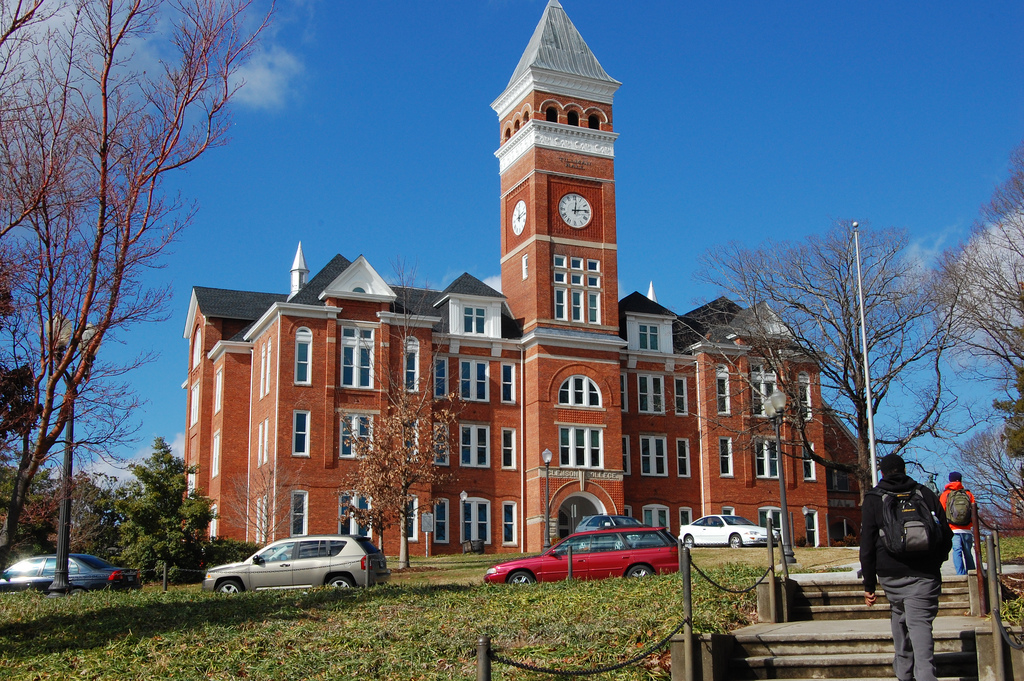
- Tillman Hall in 2008
- Interactive map of the Tillman Hall area
- Former names: Main Building

General information
- Opened: 1893

Design and construction
- Architecture firm: Bruce & Morgan

Tillman Hall is the most famous building on the Clemson University campus. The 3-story brick building with a clock tower is located on a hill overlooking Bowman Field. Tillman Hall is currently the home of the College of Education.

Connected to Tillman Hall is the Tillman Auditorium, a 755-seat auditorium that formerly was a campus chapel named Memorial Chapel. Tillman Auditorium is used primarily for lectures and seminars, small concerts, pageants and dances.

The building was named after Benjamin Tillman, a staunch opponent of civil rights. This has resulted proposals to rename Tillman Hall to its original name, the Main Building, commonly called “Old Main”.

== History ==
Tillman Hall was nationally registered as part of Clemson University Historic District I. It is one of the few remaining buildings from Clemson University's original campus.

Tillman Hall was designed by Bruce and Morgan, who also designed several other famous college buildings in the south to include Samford Hall at Auburn University and Tech Tower at Georgia Tech. The building was built in 1893 using the labor of convicts. A fire destroyed all but the exterior walls in 1894. Bruce and Morgan oversaw the subsequent renovation that was completed in 1895. Tillman Hall was originally called the Main Building or Agricultural Hall. The building featured the first library, many classrooms and laboratories, and a chapel.

The original clock in Main Building was built by the Seth Thomas Clock Company and installed in 1906. The clock tower was modernized in 1985, and the old clock was placed into storage. The Western Carolina Chapter of the National Association of Watch and Clock Collectors (NAWCC) became aware of the existence of the old clock in 2005 and worked with members of Clemson's College of Engineering to restore it. The old Tillman tower clock is on display in the Fluor Daniel Building on campus.

On June 12, 2020, Clemson University trustees publicly requested permission from the state legislature to change the name of Tillman Hall back to its original name, the Main building. “Pitchfork” Ben Tillman was a governor and U.S. senator who used virulent racism to dominate South Carolina politics after Reconstruction. The board also voted to rename the university's honor college.

== Clemson Memorial Carillon ==
Located in the top of Tillman Hall's clock tower is a 48-bell traditional carillon.

The carillon was installed in 1987. A 47 bell carillon replaced a single untuned bell, now hanging in Carillon Garden by Sikes Hall, that rang across campus during Clemson's days as a military school. The bells range in weight from 4,386 pounds to 32 pounds. The 48th bell was installed in 2012. The Undergraduate Student Senate voted to allocate $63,000 for a 2,800-pound D#/E flat 3 bell needed to complete the instrument.

Clemson Memorial Carillon is one of only 66 traditional carillons located at universities in North America.

The carillon is configured for the automatic playing of the Westminster chimes every 15 minutes or other music using traditional baton claviers.

The university carillonneur plays the carillon every Monday, Wednesday, and Friday noon-12:30 pm, August to April. Visitors are welcomed into the Tillman Hall tower to watch these performances. Students can take classes to learn how to play.

== Thomas Clemson Statue ==
There is a bronze statue on the front side of Tillman Hall. The statue is nicknamed "Old Green Tom", which refers to the weathered down figure of Clemson University's founder, Thomas Green Clemson. It is tradition for current undergraduate students to not read the plaque under this statue if they wish to graduate in 4 years.

== Name change debate ==
Due to Benjamin Tillman's politics, actions, and stance regarding racial relations, the naming of the building currently known as Tillman Hall has come under scrutiny in recent years, particularly during the 2014–2015 academic year. There have been discussions among the student senate, demonstrations by a small number of students, letters written by students to President Clements, and online discussions and petitions; however, the university has said that the only entity with authority to change the name of the iconic building is the current Clemson University Board of Trustees. Most recently, an anonymous group of students publicly defaced the brick of Tillman Hall with spray paint.". On June 12, 2020, the Clemson Board of Trustees passed a motion to petition the SC State legislature to change the name of Tillman Hall.

== See also ==
- Clemson University
- Clemson University Historic District I
- Clemson University Historic District II
- Campus of Clemson University
- The Legend of the Bell Tower Bandit
- List of carillons
