= Clemson, South Carolina =

Clemson
- City
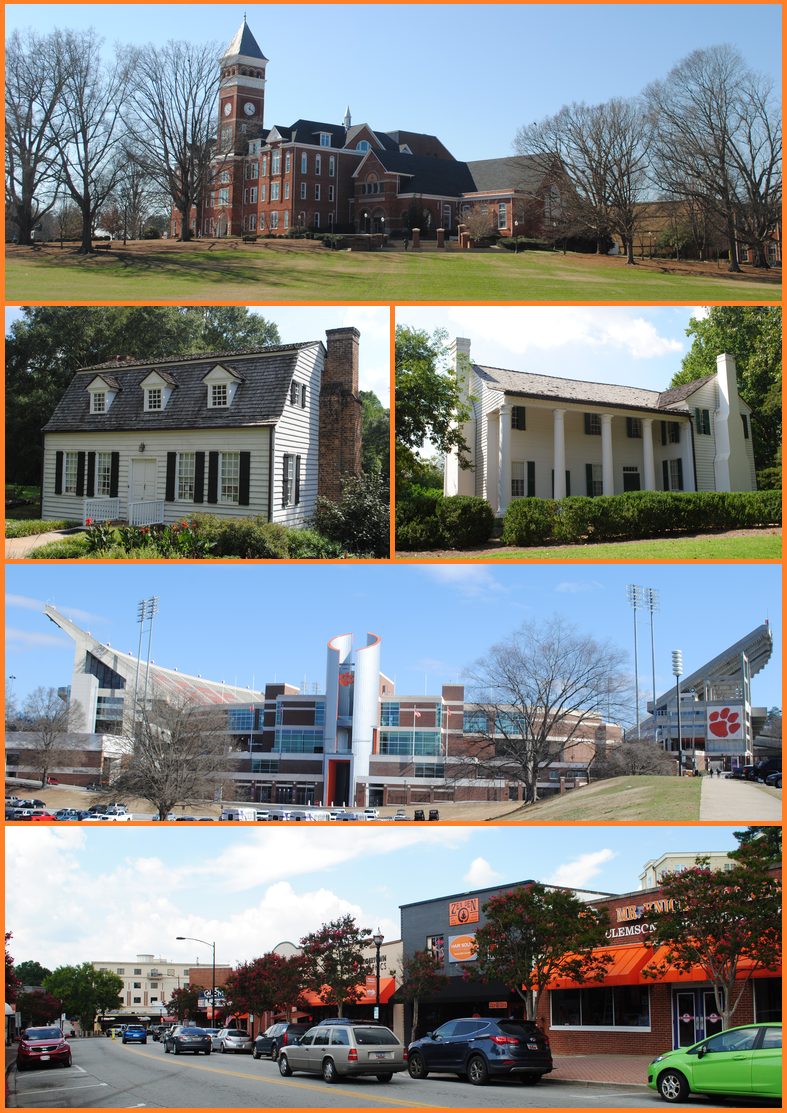
- Top, left to right: Tillman Hall (near Clemson City), Hanover House, Fort Hill, Memorial Stadium, College Avenue

- Seal
- Motto: "In season, every season."
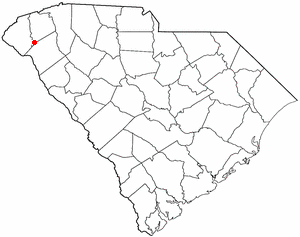
- Location of Clemson, South Carolina

- Location within South Carolina Location within the United States
- Coordinates: 34°41′01″N 82°48′43″W
- Country: United States
- State: South Carolina
- Counties: Pickens, Anderson

Area
  - City: 8.15 sq mi (21.11 km^{2})
  - Land: 7.69 sq mi (19.92 km^{2})
  - Water: 0.46 sq mi (1.19 km^{2})
- Elevation: 768 ft (234 m)

Population (2020)
  - City: 17,681
  - Density: 2,298.7/sq mi (887.54/km^{2})
  - Urban: 118,369 (US: 286th)
  - Urban density: 1,234/sq mi (476.4/km^{2})
- Time zone: UTC−5 (Eastern (EST))
  - Summer (DST): UTC−4 (EDT)
- ZIP codes: 29631-29634
- Area codes: 864, 821
- FIPS code: 45-14950
- GNIS feature ID: 2404068
- Website: www.clemsoncity.org

Clemson (/ˈklɛmpsən, ˈklɛmzən/^{[note a]}) is a city in Pickens and Anderson counties in the U.S. state of South Carolina. Clemson is adjacent to Clemson University, and is identified with it. In 2015, the Princeton Review cited the town of Clemson as ranking #1 in the United States for "town-and-gown" relations with its resident university. The population of the city was 17,681 at the 2020 census.

Clemson is part of the Greenville-Anderson-Greer, SC Metropolitan Statistical Area, which is also included in the Greenville-Spartanburg-Anderson, SC Combined Statistical Area.

== History ==
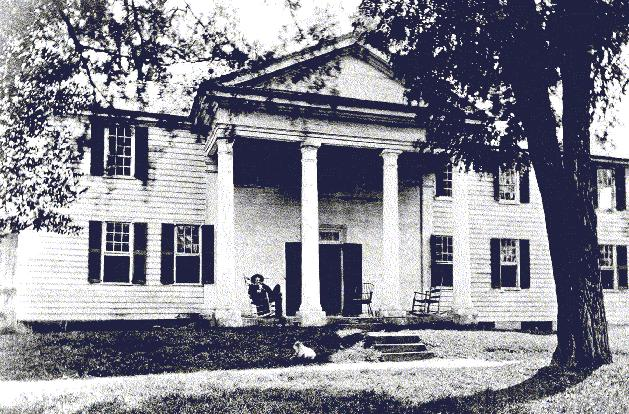
Fort Hill, photographed in 1887, was the home of Thomas Green Clemson and his wife Anna Maria Calhoun, who inherited it from her mother. He carried out Anna Maria's wish to found an agricultural college here but was credited as founder.

European Americans settled here after the Cherokee were forced to cede their land in 1819. They had lived at Keowee, and six other towns along the Keowee River as part of their traditional homelands in the Southeast. They migrated and settled in Tennessee and deeper into Georgia and Alabama, before most were subjected to forced Indian Removal in 1839 to Indian Territory (now Oklahoma).

The community was originally named Calhoun. Clemson University was founded in 1889 and located south of the original town. In 1943, the town was renamed to Clemson, reflecting its identification with the adjacent university. Clemson University has since developed into a large public university that defines the town and serves as a cultural center. A small, multi-block downtown has some housing, retail and restaurants.

The university provides housing for students, but many students live off campus in a wide variety of apartment complexes. Outside the downtown, there are few paved sidewalks, but some streets have bike paths. The city's comprehensive plan has a historic preservation component to apply to keep a range of structures in the area.

The Clemson train depot, built in 1893, was renovated in 2001; it now houses the local chamber of commerce and visitor center. The station was temporarily closed in 2016 for a road project, but was reopened in 2019. U.S. Route 123 runs along the northern end of the city and its edges have been developed with typical suburban-style shopping centers.

=== Development of Clemson College/University ===
Clemson University was founded as an agricultural college starting in 1889, on the former Fort Hill Plantation of statesman John C. Calhoun, which he had acquired by marriage. The plantation was originally owned by his mother-in-law, mother of his wife Floride. Floride Calhoun inherited the property after her mother's death in 1836 but, under South Carolina law, she likely lost any individual rights to it because of her marriage.

In the meantime, Floride and John C. Calhoun had a daughter named Anna Maria. At age 21, she married Thomas Green Clemson. After her father John C. Calhoun died in 1850; his widow Floride Calhoun gained total ownership of Fort Hill Plantation.

Because Anna Maria was the only living child, she inherited a part of Fort Hill when Floride died in 1866. Anna Maria bequeathed Thomas G. Clemson a portion of the property in her will. When Anna Maria died in 1875, he inherited the plantation. He knew that Anna Maria had wanted the land to be used as the site of an agricultural college, so Thomas Green Clemson bequeathed land for such a college in his will. After his death in 1888, what developed as Clemson University was founded on that land.

In 1992 the City of Clemson had proposed that Clemson University become a part of the city. The university received a plan on joining the city boundaries and, in 1993, decided not to go through with the plan.

== Geography ==
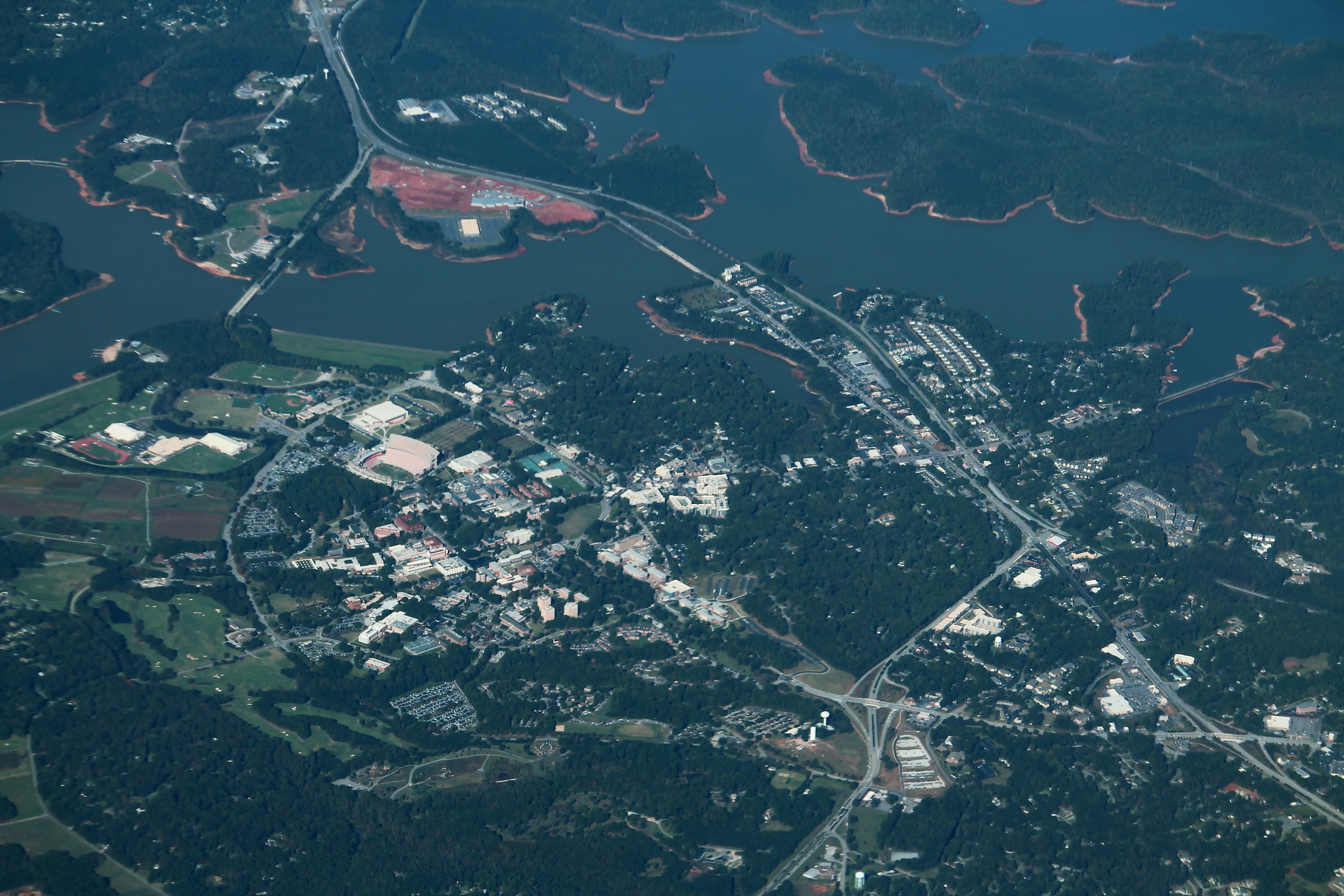
Aerial view of Clemson. Clemson University is on the left.

Clemson is located at 34°41′6″N 82°48′53″W (34.684930, −82.814777) approximately 27 miles (43 km) west of downtown Greenville and 15 miles (24 km) north of Anderson. The city is situated near the northwestern corner of South Carolina in the foothills of the Blue Ridge Mountains while also on the shores of Lake Hartwell.

According to the United States Census Bureau, the city has an area of 7.9 square miles (20.5 km^{2}), of which 7.5 square miles (19.3 km^{2}) is land and 0.46 square miles (1.2 km^{2}), or 5.85%, is water.

=== Climate ===
Typical of the Upstate, Clemson has a humid subtropical climate (Köppen) characterized by hot, humid summers and cool winters. Precipitation is ample through the year, although it reaches a maximum in August and February; snowfall is typically sporadic with a normal seasonal (December through March) total accumulation of 2.2 in (5.6 cm).

Climate data for Clemson University, South Carolina (1991–2020 normals, extremes 1896–present)
Month	Jan	Feb	Mar	Apr	May	Jun	Jul	Aug	Sep	Oct	Nov	Dec	Year
Record high °F (°C)	80 (27)	82 (28)	89 (32)	93 (34)	100 (38)	105 (41)	106 (41)	104 (40)	104 (40)	98 (37)	86 (30)	81 (27)	106 (41)
Mean daily maximum °F (°C)	53.4 (11.9)	57.1 (13.9)	64.6 (18.1)	73.3 (22.9)	80.6 (27.0)	87.6 (30.9)	91.0 (32.8)	89.5 (31.9)	84.2 (29.0)	74.3 (23.5)	64.3 (17.9)	55.9 (13.3)	73.0 (22.8)
Daily mean °F (°C)	42.9 (6.1)	45.8 (7.7)	52.6 (11.4)	60.8 (16.0)	68.9 (20.5)	76.4 (24.7)	79.8 (26.6)	78.6 (25.9)	73.0 (22.8)	62.2 (16.8)	51.9 (11.1)	45.1 (7.3)	61.5 (16.4)
Mean daily minimum °F (°C)	32.5 (0.3)	34.6 (1.4)	40.6 (4.8)	48.2 (9.0)	57.2 (14.0)	65.1 (18.4)	68.5 (20.3)	67.7 (19.8)	61.9 (16.6)	50.0 (10.0)	39.5 (4.2)	34.4 (1.3)	50.0 (10.0)
Record low °F (°C)	−5 (−21)	−7 (−22)	4 (−16)	24 (−4)	32 (0)	42 (6)	49 (9)	52 (11)	34 (1)	23 (−5)	10 (−12)	2 (−17)	−7 (−22)
Average precipitation inches (mm)	4.94 (125)	4.36 (111)	4.80 (122)	4.20 (107)	4.06 (103)	4.16 (106)	4.09 (104)	5.27 (134)	3.80 (97)	3.76 (96)	3.87 (98)	5.07 (129)	52.38 (1,330)
Average snowfall inches (cm)	0.8 (2.0)	0.8 (2.0)	0.3 (0.76)	0.0 (0.0)	0.0 (0.0)	0.0 (0.0)	0.0 (0.0)	0.0 (0.0)	0.0 (0.0)	0.0 (0.0)	0.0 (0.0)	0.3 (0.76)	2.2 (5.6)
Average precipitation days (≥ 0.01 in)	10.6	10.5	10.7	9.7	9.7	11.1	10.4	10.8	8.3	7.7	9.2	11.3	120.0
Average snowy days (≥ 0.1 in)	0.4	0.5	0.1	0.0	0.0	0.0	0.0	0.0	0.0	0.0	0.0	0.4	1.4
Source: NOAA

=== National Register of Historical Places ===
The following places and buildings in Clemson City are listed on the National Register of Historic Places:

- J. C. Stribling Barn
- Old Stone Church and Cemetery

Places on the Clemson University campus on the NRHP:

- Clemson University Historic District I and II
- Clemson College Sheep Barn
- Fort Hill (John C. Calhoun Mansion and Library)
- Hanover House

Other places with Clemson addresses:

- Hopewell Plantation - Gen. Andrew Pickens' Home
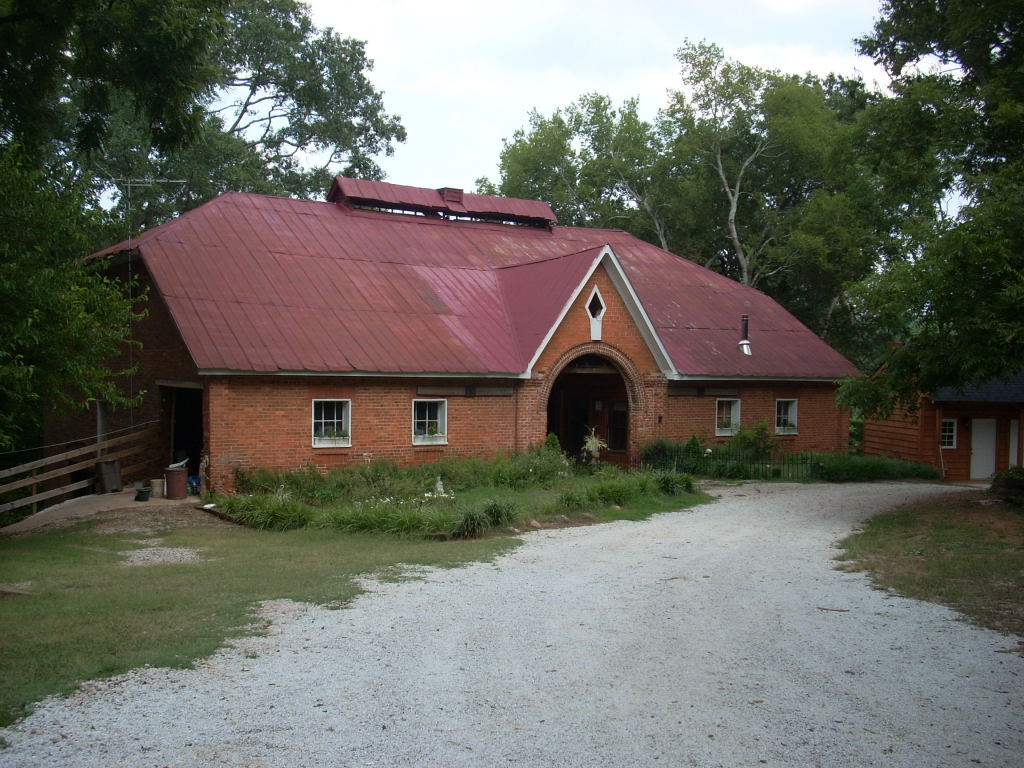
J. C. Stribling Barn (Clemson City)

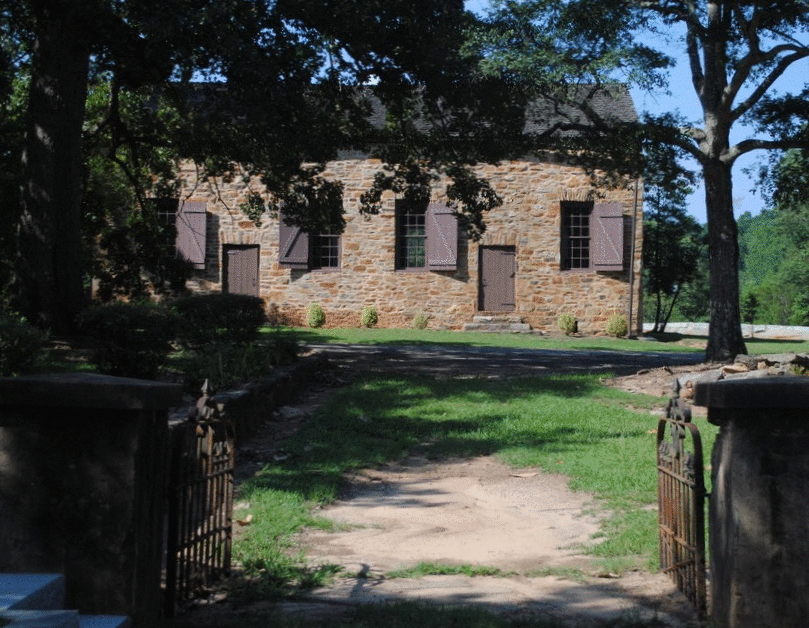
Old Stone Church and Cemetery (Clemson City)

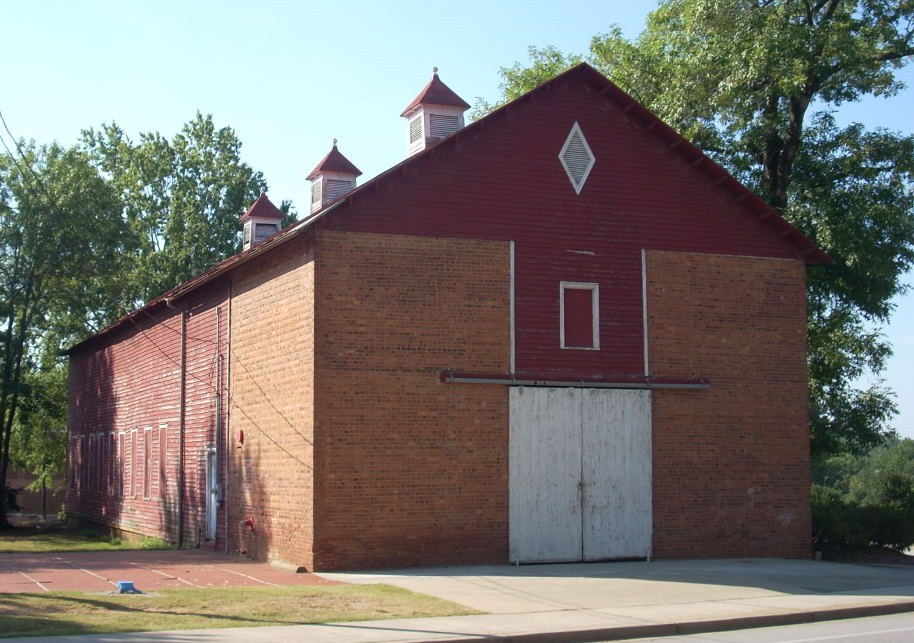
Clemson College Sheep Barn

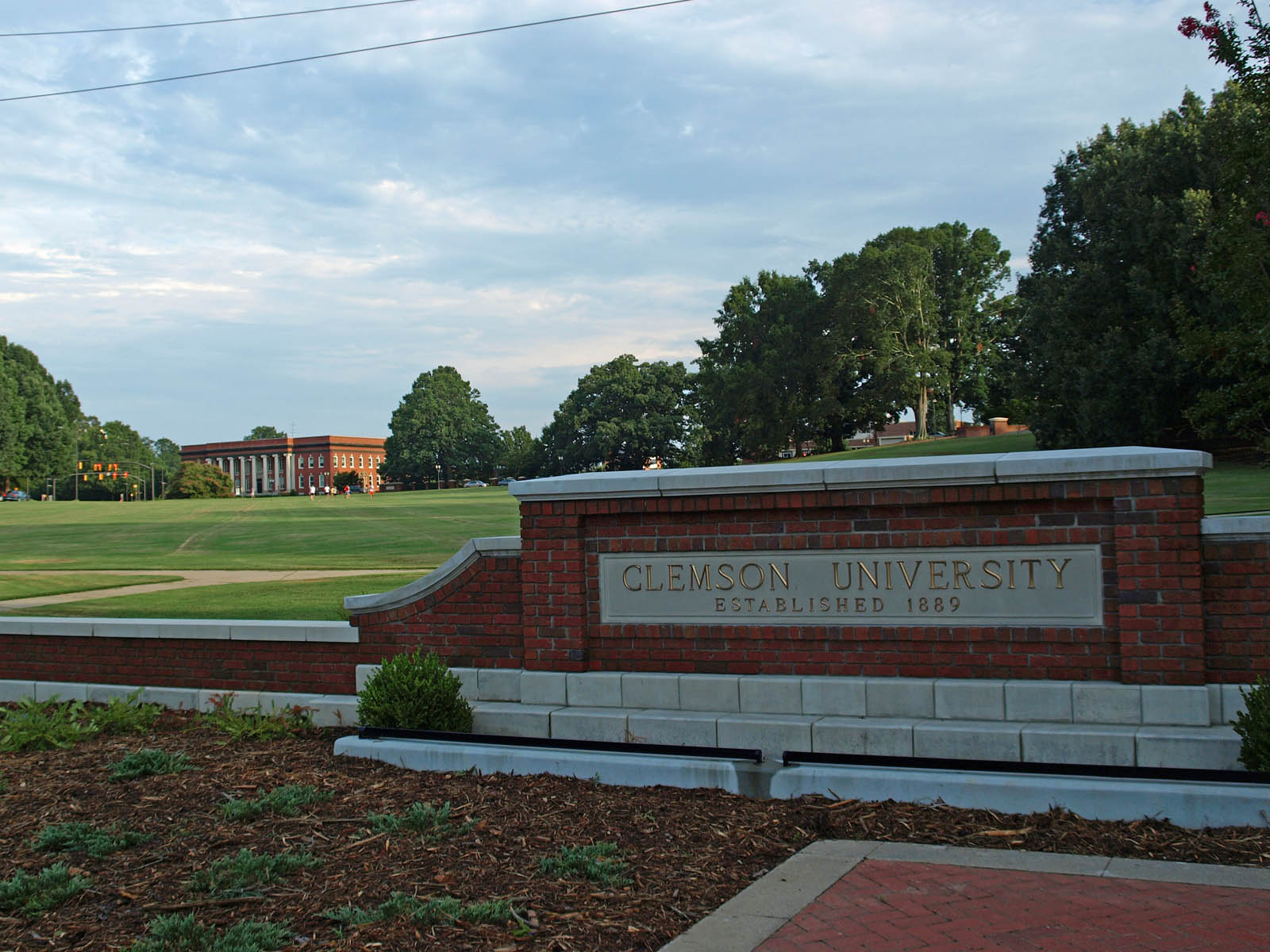
Bowman Field and Sikes Hall of the Clemson University Historic District I

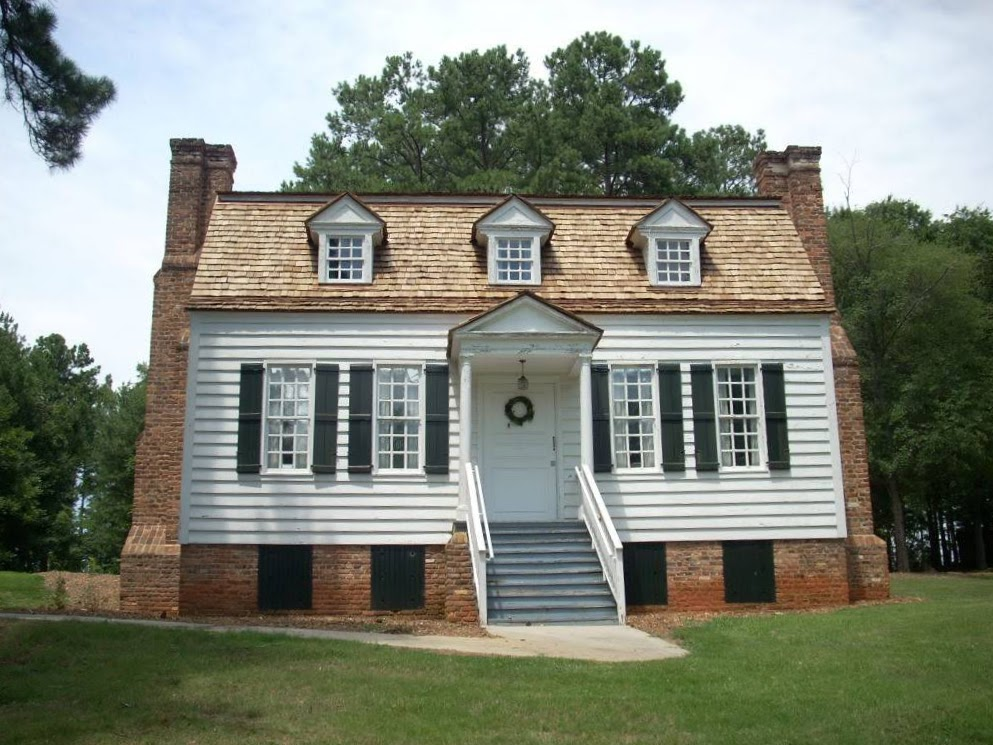
Hanover House (Clemson University)

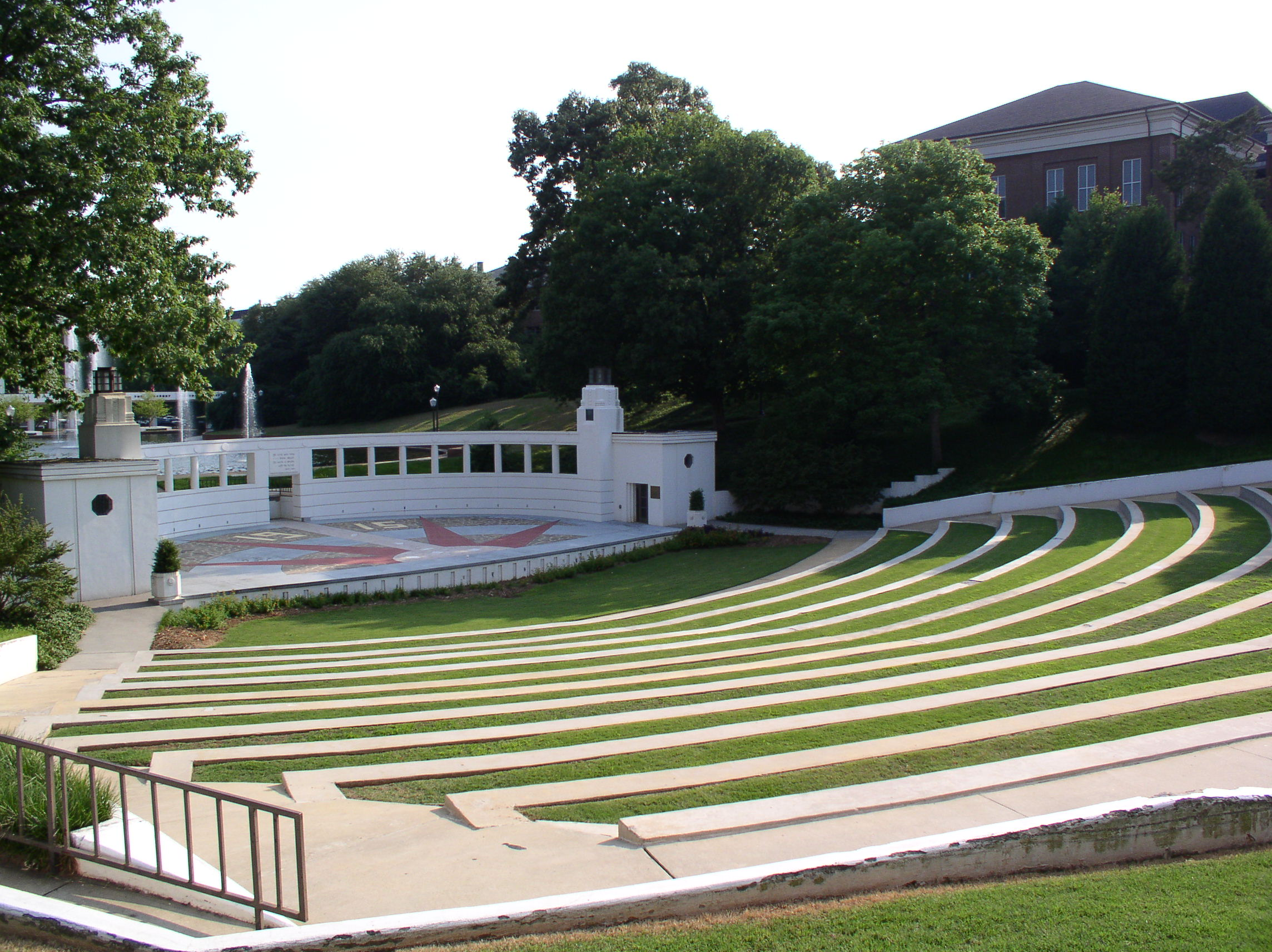
Amphitheater of the Clemson University Historic District II

=== Attractions ===
Clemson University is home to South Carolina Botanical Garden, Fort Hill Plantation and Bob Campbell Geology Museum. Lake Hartwell, a reservoir, is a popular recreation area that borders the city on the west. The Blue Ridge Mountains are just 30 miles (48 km) from the city center.

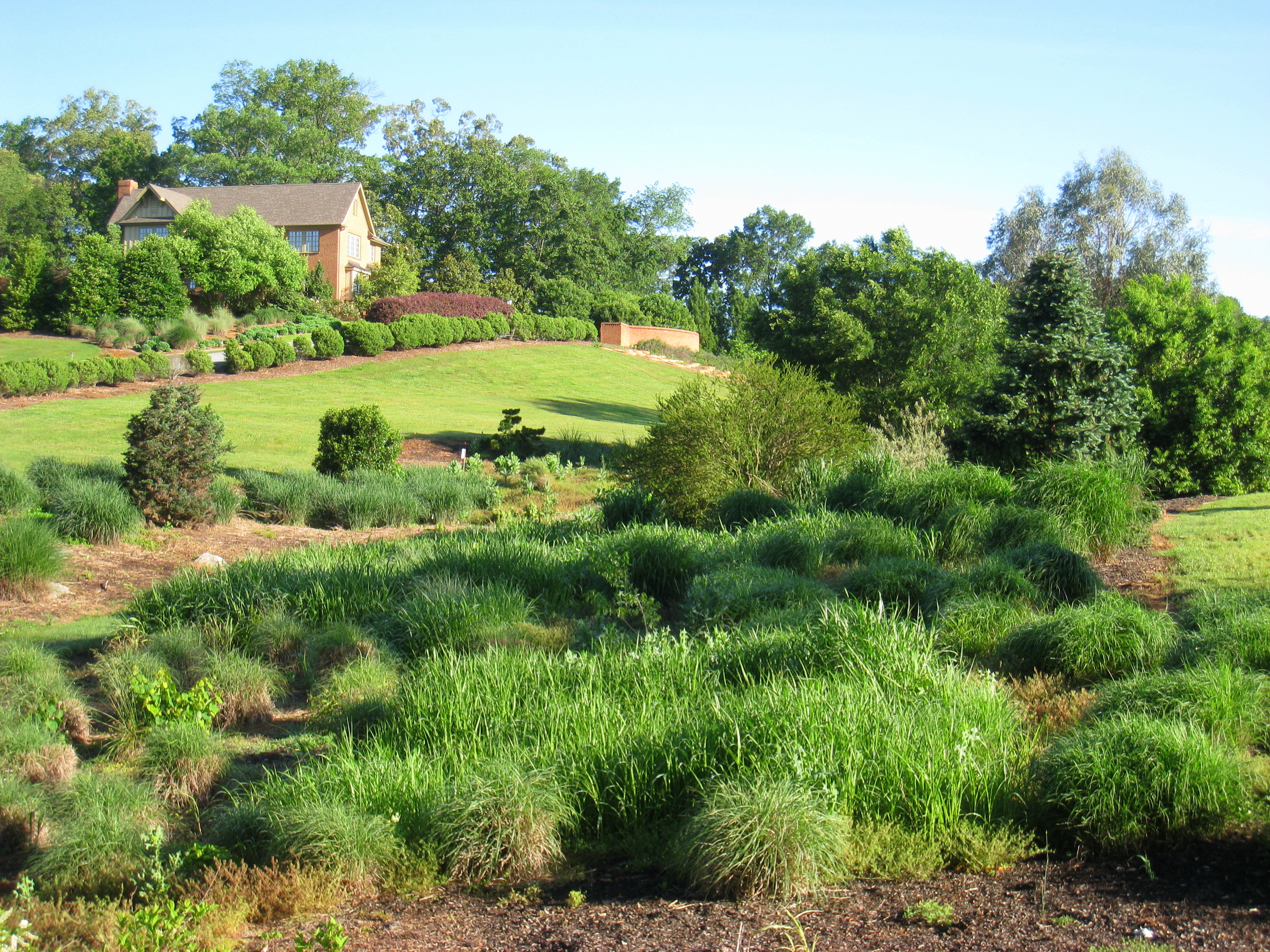
South Carolina Botanical Garden

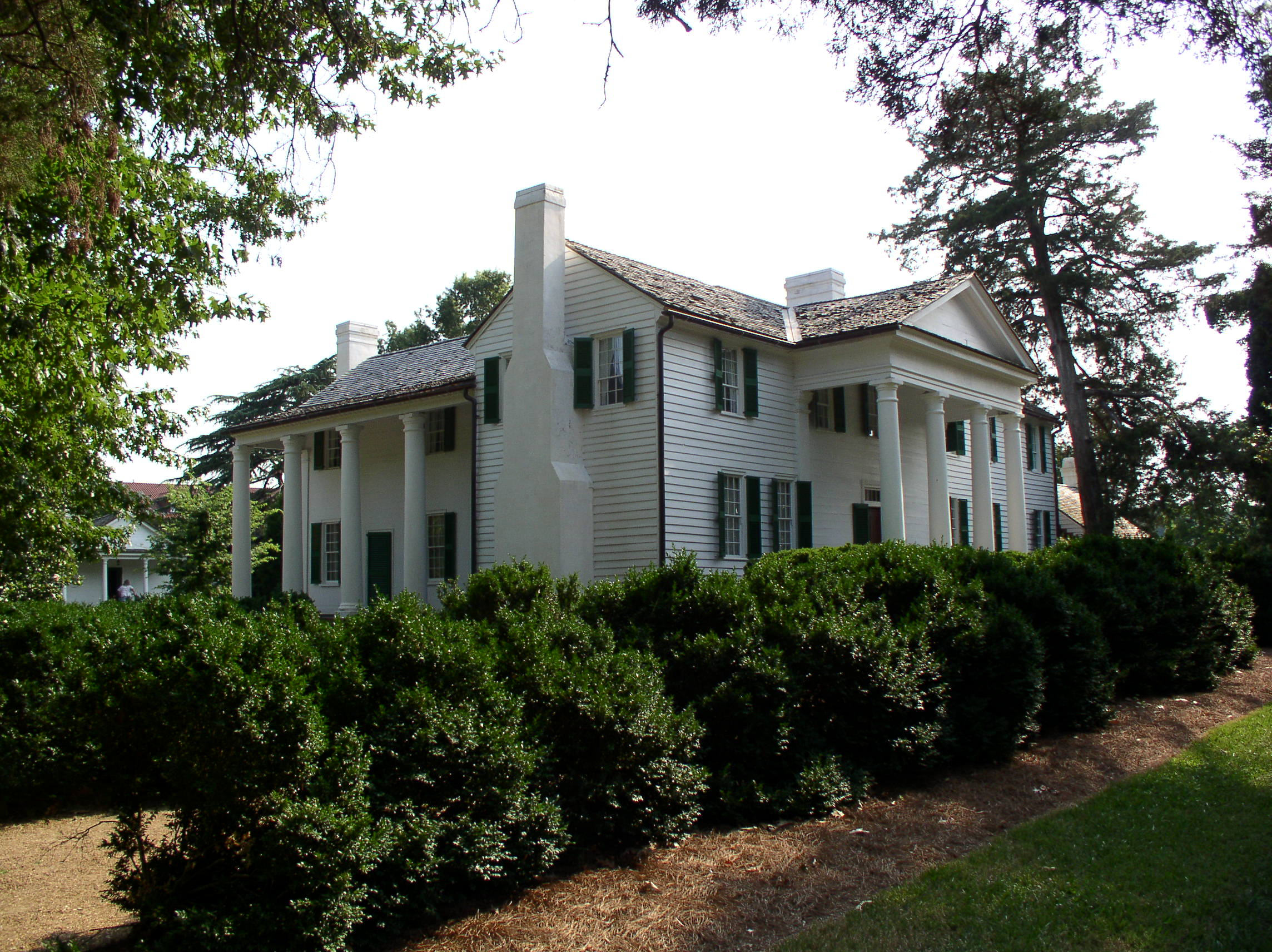
Fort Hill

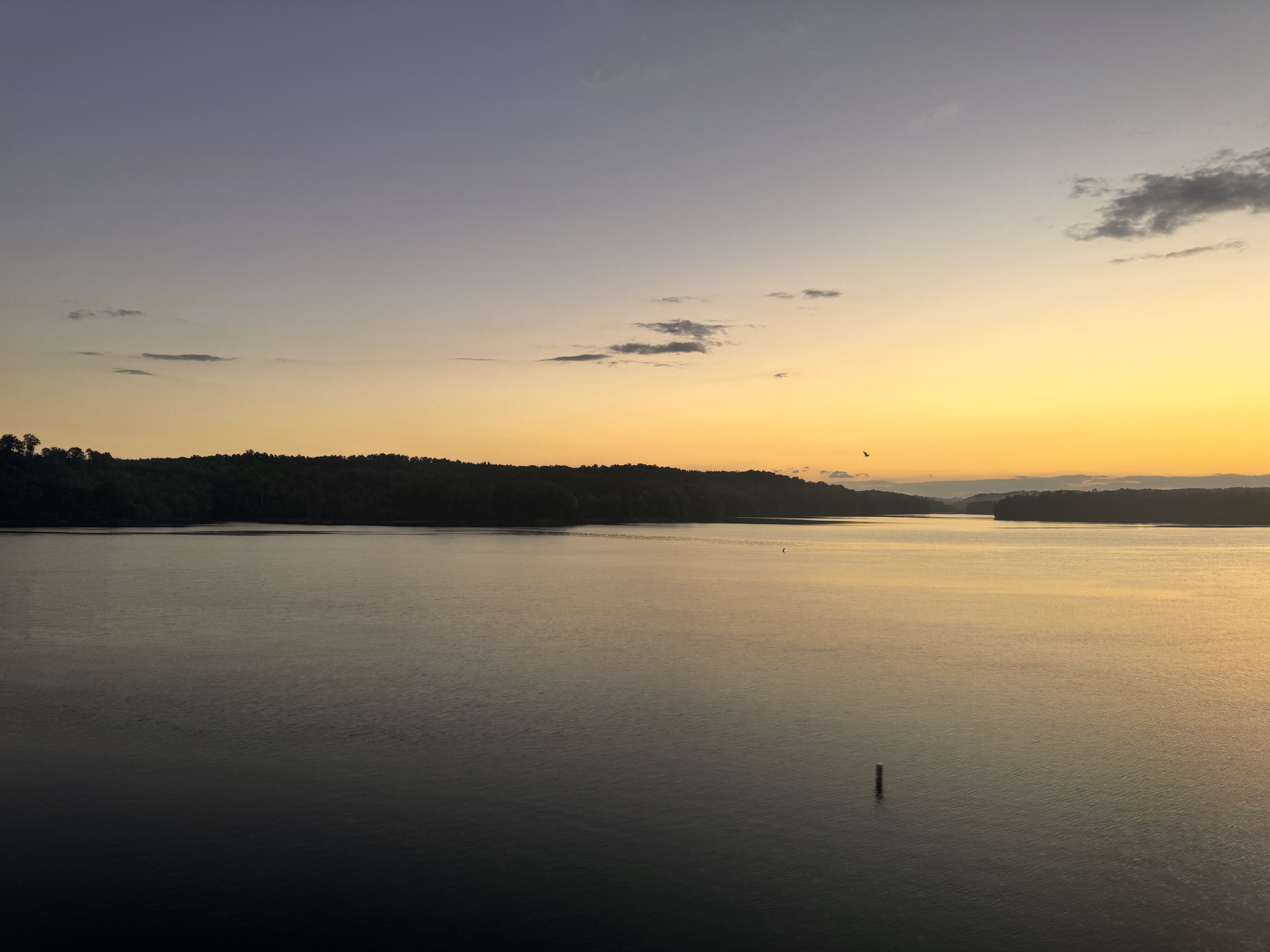
Lake Hartwell

== Demographics ==
Historical population
Census	Pop.	Note	%±
1940	761		—
1950	1,204		58.2%
1960	1,587		31.8%
1970	6,690		321.6%
1980	8,118		21.3%
1990	11,096		36.7%
2000	11,939		7.6%
2010	13,905		16.5%
2020	17,681		27.2%
2025 (est.)	18,941	▲	7.1%
U.S. Decennial Census

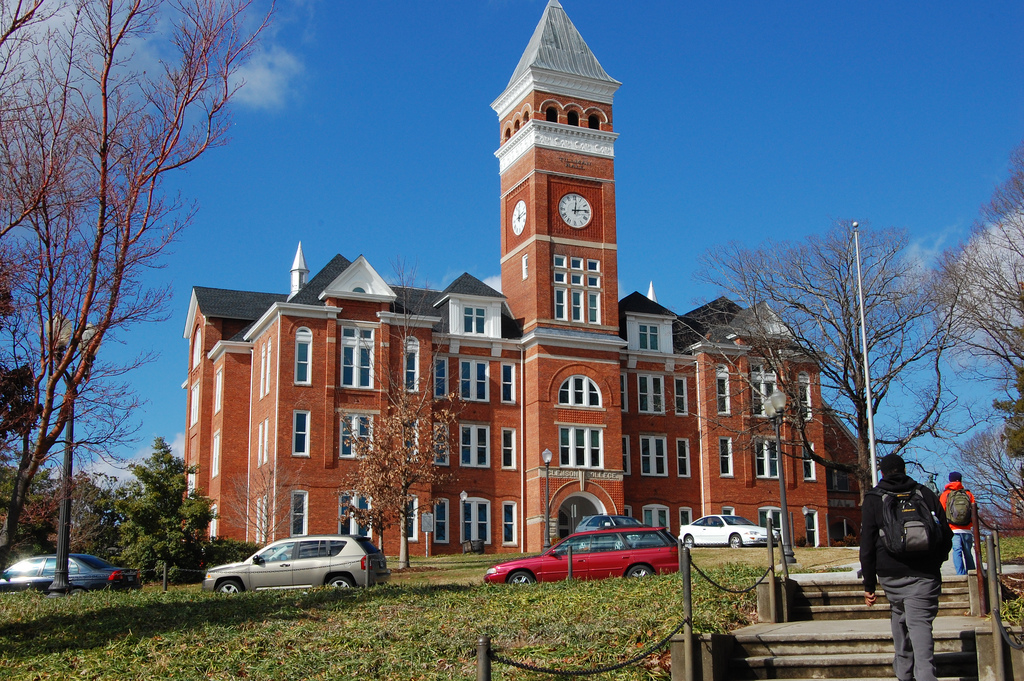
Tillman Hall at Clemson University in 2008

=== 2020 census ===
As of the 2020 census, Clemson had a population of 17,681. The median age was 24.0 years. 13.7% of residents were under the age of 18 and 13.0% of residents were 65 years of age or older. For every 100 females there were 100.1 males, and for every 100 females age 18 and over there were 100.1 males age 18 and over.

99.3% of residents lived in urban areas, while 0.7% lived in rural areas.

There were 7,348 households in Clemson, of which 18.6% had children under the age of 18 living in them. Of all households, 29.3% were married-couple households, 32.7% were households with a male householder and no spouse or partner present, and 34.0% were households with a female householder and no spouse or partner present. About 29.5% of all households were made up of individuals and 8.2% had someone living alone who was 65 years of age or older.

There were 8,495 housing units, of which 13.5% were vacant. The homeowner vacancy rate was 1.7% and the rental vacancy rate was 9.1%.

Racial composition as of the 2020 census
Race	Number	Percent
White	13,565	76.7%
Black or African American	1,332	7.5%
American Indian and Alaska Native	46	0.3%
Asian	1,503	8.5%
Native Hawaiian and Other Pacific Islander	6	0.0%
Some other race	258	1.5%
Two or more races	971	5.5%
Hispanic or Latino (of any race)	794	4.5%

As of 2023, of the 17,681 people living in the municipality of Clemson, 17,641 live in Pickens County and 40 live in Anderson County.

=== 2010 census ===
The 2010 census shows Clemson's population rose to 14,089 in 2012, showing an increase of 0.9% over two years and three months (from April 1, 2010, to July 1, 2012). The population in 2010 consisted of 5,823 households with an average of 2.33 people living in each household. This household quantity includes 2,474 family households, 932 of which had children younger than 18. 37% of these households were married couples, 2.3% male householder with no wife present and 3.2% female householders with no husband present. The rest of these households were composed of non-family households (57.5%) and householders living along (31.3%).

The city of Clemson had a population density of 1,869 persons per square mile. The number of housing units in the city was 6,925. The overall racial distribution of the city was 78.4% white, 8.9% black or African American, 0.3% American Indian and Alaska Native, 8.3% Asian, and 2.2% Hispanic or Latino. The age distribution for Clemson is as follows: 4.1% under the age of 5 years, 3.3% 5–9 years, 4.4% 10–14 years, 4.3% 15–19 years, 32.6% 20–24 years, 14% 25–34 years, 8.8% 35–44 years, 8.8% 45–54, and 19.7% older than 55.

The median household income was $29,828 and the median family income was $77,704. The median earnings for a male worker (full-time) was $42,597, compared to the median earnings for a female worker (full-time), which was $32,524. The city of Clemson had a per capita income of about $23,906. 17.6% of the population was below the poverty line, 13.2% of that total being families.

=== 2000 census ===
As of the census of 2000, there were 11,939 people, 5,061 households and 2,196 families residing in the city. The population does not reflect the additional on-campus population of Clemson University, which adds roughly 17,000 additional residents for eight months of the year.

The population density was 1,620.6 inhabitants per square mile (625.7/km^{2}). There were 5,679 housing units at an average density of 770.8 units per square mile (297.6 units/km^{2}). The city's racial makeup was 80.98% White, 11.38% African American, 5.73% Asian, 0.11% Native American, 0.03% Pacific Islander, 0.73% from other races, and 1.05% from two or more races. Hispanic or Latino of any race were 1.82% of the population.

There were 5,061 households, out of which 17.8% had children younger than 18 living with them, 35.2% were married couples living together, 5.9% had a female householder with no husband present and 56.6% were non-families. 28.6% of all households were made up of individuals, and 7.7% had someone living alone who was 65 or older. The average household size was 2.30, and the average family size was 2.84.

In the city, the population was spread out, with 14.5% younger than 18, 36.8% from 18 to 24, 20.4% from 25 to 44, 15.5% from 45 to 64, and 12.7% who were 65 older. The median age was 25 years. For every 100 females. there were 106.4 males. For every 100 females age 18 and older, there were 107.5 males.

The median income for a household in the city was $26,892, and the median income for a family was $61,176. Males had a median income of $39,318 versus $28,663 for females. The per capita income for the city was $19,272. About 8.8% of families and 33.1% of the population were below the poverty line, including 13.1% of those under age 18 and 8.4% of those age 65 or over.

== Public safety ==
The city of Clemson operates the Clemson Police Department. The Police Department is at 1198 Tiger Boulevard.

Clemson University Fire Department provides fire protection to the City of Clemson. The Clemson University Fire Department has two stations. One is on campus at 1521 Perimeter Road (its headquarters) while the second station is at 740 Issaqueena Trail in the City of Clemson.

Pickens County EMS provides public safety needs. All departments are staffed 24 hours a day, seven days a week. Pickens County EMS Medic 4 is at 115 Commons Way in Central.

== Transportation ==
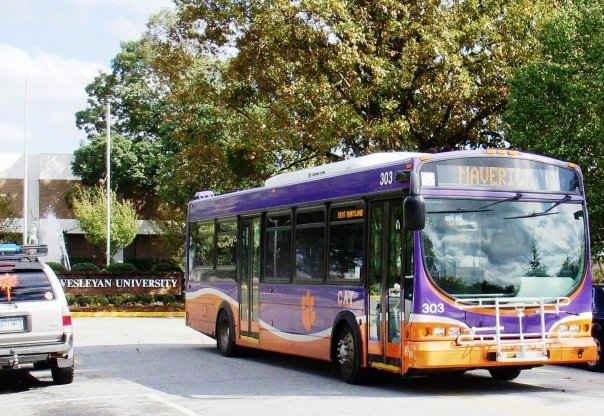
Clemson Area Transit bus

Clemson Area Transit (CAT) is a free transportation service that operates throughout the Clemson, Anderson, Pendleton and Seneca areas. All CAT buses are made accessible for patrons with disabilities and can accommodate any special needs. The CAT buses also provide transfer services to the local Electric City Transit bus in Anderson. Riders can receive vouchers from CAT bus operators in order to continue their ride fare-free on the Anderson shuttles.

The city of Clemson has an Amtrak station at the corner of Calhoun Memorial Highway and College Avenue. The Crescent travels from New Orleans to New York City and stops at Clemson station.

The Clemson area is near three major airports. The closest, Greenville-Spartanburg International Airport, is 45 minutes away in Greenville, South Carolina. Hartsfield-Jackson Atlanta International Airport (ATL) is two and a half hours away in Atlanta, Georgia, and Charlotte-Douglas International Airport (CLT) is also two and a half hours away in Charlotte, North Carolina. Many different services provide transportation to and from the airport from the Clemson area, including The Airport Shuttle, Anderson/Clemson Shuttle Service, Yellow Cab and Andrews Airport Services.

== Education ==
=== K-12 education ===
The portion of Clemson within Pickens County is in the Pickens County School District, which covers the entire county. Students living in the city of Clemson attend Clemson Elementary School, RC Edwards Middle School, and D. W. Daniel High School.

Clemson Elementary School was originally called the Calhoun-Clemson School and was on College Avenue. In 1964, the school burned down, destroying everything but the cafeteria, and the newer first and second grade wing, a separate building. The school was rebuilt on Frontage Road and was named Margaret Morrison Elementary School. The once segregated Calhoun Colored School was renamed Morrison annex and was used to house the primary grades and self-contained resource students. After the schools had outgrown their buildings, construction began in 1999 on a new school building on Berkeley Drive. This is now the site of the current Clemson Elementary. Clemson Elementary colors are orange and blue, and its mascot is the tiger cub.

RC Edwards was built and opened in 1971, and named for the President of Clemson University. It currently educates sixth-, seventh- and eighth-graders. The campus is located in Central, and has about 800 students. Its colors are purple and white, and the mascot is the panther.

The current D. W. Daniel High School was constructed in 2010 and had its first class enter the doors for the 2012–2013 school year. The school is named after David Wistar Daniel, a professor at Clemson College, who was invested in the public school system and spent many years on the South Carolina Board of Education. It recently was named one of the best regular public schools in the state by US News magazine. Its colors are blue and gold, and the mascot is the lion. The school is well known for its football team. In the 2013–2014 season, the team ended the year 14 wins to one loss, which occurred in the 3A State Championship against Myrtle Beach High School.

The portion of Clemson in Anderson County is in Anderson School District 4.

=== Colleges and universities ===
Clemson is adjacent to Clemson University, and is identified with it; in 2015, the Princeton Review cited the town of Clemson as ranking #1 in the United States for "town-and-gown" relations with its resident university.

As the university is not in the City of Clemson corporate limits, the university does not have to abide by City of Clemson municipal ordinances nor receive permission to do any undertaking from the City of Clemson. The South Carolina General Assembly designated Clemson University as a "municipal corporation" in 1894.

In 2019, Mollie R. Simon of the Greenville News wrote that the growth of the university has caused a disruption in the relationship between the municipal government and the university.

=== Libraries ===
The relevant public library is the Central-Clemson Library in Central, operated by the Pickens County Library System.

== City government ==
The city has a City Council and participates as a member of the Pickens County Council. The state senator is Thomas C. Alexander, and the state representative is Phillip Bowers. Clemson City Council consists of an Arts and Culture Commission, a Planning Commission, a Board of Architectural Review and a Board of Zoning Appeals.

The city of Clemson also works directly with the International Town Gown Association (ITGA) that works to provide information on common issues between universities and their neighboring towns. Two Clemson representatives serve on the ITGA Executive Board: Jim Oswald, ITGA Treasurer, and Beth Bagwell, ITGA Director.

== Footnotes ==
- ^Note a:The local, authoritative pronunciation of Clemson is /ˈklɛmpsən/. Those not familiar with the local pronunciation often say /ˈklɛmzən/ or /ˈklɛmsən/, as the spelling would suggest. See generally The Routledge Handbook of Contemporary English Pronunciation.
