= Clemson =

Clemson may refer to:

- Clemson, South Carolina, a city in the U.S. state of South Carolina
  - Clemson University, a public university located in Clemson, South Carolina.
    - Clemson Tigers, the athletic programs of Clemson University.
- SS D. M. Clemson, two American ships in Lake Superior
- Clemson-class destroyer, a U.S. Navy ship class at the close of World War I, many still serving during World War II
- USS Clemson, any of several U.S. Navy ships

== People ==
- Anna Maria Calhoun Clemson (1817–1875), daughter of John C. Calhoun and wife of Thomas Green Clemson
- Floride Clemson (1842–1871), American writer
- Henry A. Clemson (1818–1846), American naval officer
- Jeanne Clemson (1922–2009), American theater director
- Thomas Green Clemson (1807–1888), American politician and founder of Clemson University
