= Anne Thompson =

Anne Thompson may refer to:

- Anne Elise Thompson (born 1934), United States federal judge
- Anne Thompson (artist) (fl. 2002), American artist
- Anne Thompson (film journalist) (active since 1981), American journalist writing on film
- Anne Thompson (TV journalist) (active since 1979), American journalist working for NBC News
- Anne M. Thompson (active in NASA since 1986), American scientist
- Anne M. Thompson (politician) (active 1957–1960), American newspaper publisher and state legislator in Colorado
- Anne Thompson MacDonald (1896–1993), née Thompson, American philanthropist

== See also ==
- Annie Thompson (1845–1913), spouse of Sir John Thompson, prime minister of Canada
- Anne Thomson (active 1948–1954), British nurse
- Ann Thomson (born 1933), Australian painter
- Ann Thompson Gerry (1763–1849), wife of vice-president Elbridge Gerry
- Georgia Ann Thompson (1893–1978), American pioneering parachutist
- Ann Hartley (1942–2024), née Thompson, New Zealand politician
- Anna Thompson (disambiguation)
