= Wedler =

Wedler is a German language habitational surname. Notable people with the name include:

- Gerd Wedler (1929–2008), German chemist
- Henry Wedler, American chemist and entrepreneur
- Luna Wedler (1999), Swiss actress
- Weronika Wedler (1989), Polish sprint athlete
