= Climpson =

Climpson is a surname of English origin. Notable people with the surname include:

- Mary Janet Climpson (died 1940), British Salvation Army officer interred in Dieppe Canadian War Cemetery
- Roger Climpson (1931–2025), British-born Australian journalist, newsreader and television presenter

== Fictional characters ==
- Miss Katharine Climpson, fictional character, elderly spinster, colleague of Lord Peter Wimsey in several detective novels by Dorothy L. Sayers

== See also ==
- Clemson (disambiguation)
- Clempson
