= Floride Clemson =

American woman (1842–1871)

- Born: December 29, 1842; Fort Hill, South Carolina, U.S.
- Died: July 23, 1871 (aged 28); Carmel, New York, U.S.
- Other names: C. de Flori (pseudonym); Floride Elizabeth Lee
- Occupations: Diarist, poet
- Spouse: Gideon Lee III
- Parent(s): Thomas Green Clemson; Anna Maria Calhoun Clemson
- Relatives: John C. Calhoun (grandfather)

Floride Elizabeth Clemson Lee (December 29, 1842 – July 23, 1871) was an American diarist and poet, known for her writings during and after the Civil War.

== Early life ==
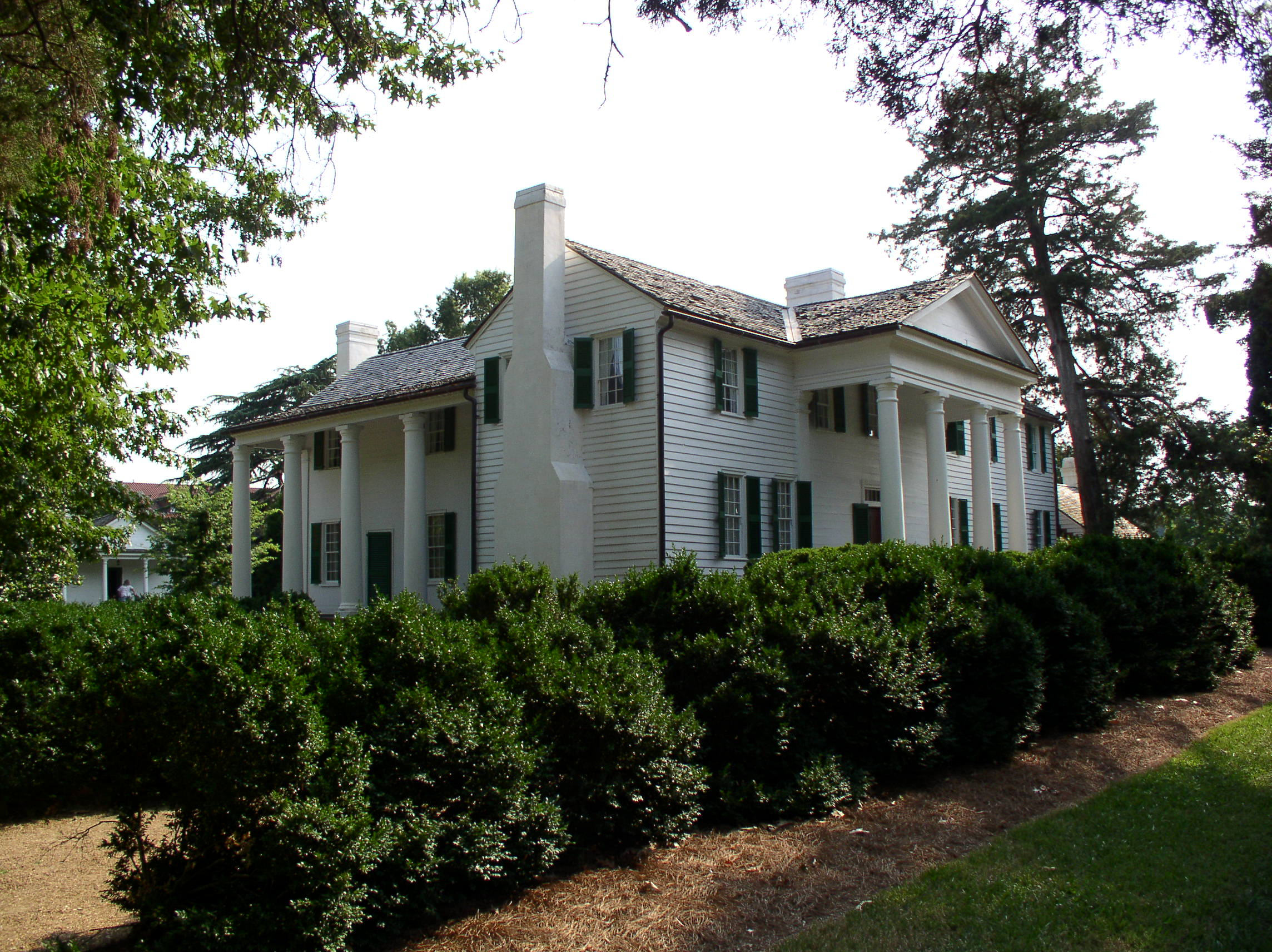
Fort Hill, where Clemson was born in 1842

Clemson was born on December 29, 1842, at Fort Hill in South Carolina. She was the daughter of Thomas Green Clemson (founder of Clemson University) and Anna Maria Calhoun Clemson, and the granddaughter of John C. Calhoun (former vice president of the U.S.) and Floride Calhoun. One of her closest friends was Harriet Lane, niece of James Buchanan.

In 1852, the Clemson family settled near Bladensburg, Maryland. Clemson had only two years of formal education.

== Writing ==
Clemson's father and brother supported the Confederacy when the American Civil War began in 1861, but she lived in Maryland, a Union state, with her mother. She began keeping a diary on January 1, 1863. She and her mother traveled from Maryland to South Carolina during the war, in December 1864. Mary D. Robertson wrote in The Register of the Kentucky Historical Society that "Floride Clemson's diary affords an interesting glimpse into the life of a young woman caught up in the disruptions, dislocations, and deprivations of the Civil War and its aftermath. The diary's real value however, lies in the intimate and candid view it provides of the Clemson/Calhoun families."

After the war, she published a volume of poems under a pseudonym, "C. de Flori" (an anagram of "Floride C."), titled Poet Skies and Other Experiments in Versification (1868).

== Personal life and legacy ==
Clemson married Gideon Lee III (1824–1894), son of New York mayor Gideon Lee. They had one daughter, Floride Isabella Lee, known as Isabella. Isabella Lee was involved in a Supreme Court case in 1890, over the ownership of the Calhoun property in Fort Hill. Floride Clemson Lee died of tuberculosis at their home in Carmel, New York, on July 23, 1871, at the age of 28. In the 1960s, her Civil War era writings were recognized as valuable, and two volumes of her work were published by the University of South Carolina Press. Her diary and letters were published again in a revised edition in 1989.

== Selected works ==
- In 1961, A Rebel Came Home: The Diary and Letters of Floride Clemson, 1863-1866 was published by the University of South Carolina Press. The book was edited by Charles M. McGee and Ernest M. Lander Jr. A revised edition of the book was published in 1989 with supplemental material and an updated introduction.
- In 1965, The Verse of Floride Clemson was published by the University of South Carolina Press, edited by Harriet R. Holman.
