= Clempson =

Clempson is a surname. Notable people with the surname include:

- Clem Clempson (born 1949), English rock guitarist
- Frank Clempson (1930–1970), English footballer and manager

== See also ==
- Climpson
