= Henry Wedler =

American chemist and entrepreneur

- Born: Petaluma, California, U.S.
- Education: University of California, Davis
- Scientific career
- Fields: Chemistry
- Doctoral advisor: Prof. Dean Tantillo
- Website: hobywedler.com

Henry "Hoby" Wedler (Born C. 1987) is an American chemist and entrepreneur. He was born blind and has advocated for greater accessibility of science to disabled students. Wedler even suggests that visually impaired chemists could have an advantage over sighted colleagues, due to the need to mentally imagine the structure of organic compounds; "I've been visualizing things my entire life".

== Education ==
While at high school in his native Petaluma, California, Wedler was told by a teacher that his blindness made laboratory chemistry an impossibility. Initially dissuaded from entering science due to such concerns about his disability, Wedler studied both chemistry and US history at university so that he could pursue a PhD in the latter.

Upon meeting Dean Tantillo, who worked alongside him to support Wedler's education and research in his lab group, Wedler started a PhD in organic chemistry at University of California, Davis. Wedler's research output has included journal articles advocating practical approaches to make chemistry research possible for the visually impaired, discussing education, safety, software and even the functioning of service animals in the lab. This includes involvement in the creation of software to extract 3D printable-models of molecules from 2D maps available in the literature. Furthermore, these models are annotated in braille with information such as bond length. Wedler has conducted computational chemical analysis of the compounds involved in the flavouring of wine, as well as markers for the refinement of olive oil.

== Career ==
Wedler founded and remains CEO of the not-for-profit Accessible Science. Through this Wedler runs chemistry camps aimed at visually impaired high school students. These camps focused on skills such as utilizing campers' sense of smell to determine the progression of chemical reactions. Wedler further assures blind people considering a career in chemistry that "nobody can see atoms, and honestly most reactions in higher-level chemistry are clear, so there's no reason you can't think about chemistry".

He gave a TEDx Talk in Sonoma County about the role of sensory experience in his life and how important it is to maximise the experiences of taste and smell. After completing his PhD in 2017 Wedler co-founded Senspoint, a consultancy for sensory experiences.

In 2022, Wedler co-founded Emotitech, a research and design firm specializing in predicting human behavior through validated emotions. It is based in Palo Alto and South Tyrol, Italy.

== Achievements ==
Wedler was presented with a National Achievement Award in 2011 by Learning Ally, an organization focused on opening typed literature to visually impaired or dyslexic audiences.

For his role in promoting chemistry and science to blind people Wedler became a Champion of Change as part of an initiative run by the White House under Barack Obama. He was recognised for his contributions to the category of 'Stem Equality For Americans With Disabilities'.

Forbes recognised Wedler as one of their 30 Under 30 in the Food and Drink category, emphasising his role in leading blind wine tastings in California. Wedler regularly runs blind wine tasting at Francis Ford Coppola Winery in Wine Country, blindfolding the participants so that they can embrace the aroma and flavours of wine without the 'distraction of sight'.

== Awards and honors ==
- 2011 National Achievement Award by Learning Ally.
- 2012 Champion of Change by The White House.
- 2016 30 Under 30 (Food and Drink) by Forbes.
- 2016 40 Under 40 by Sacramento Business Journal.
- 2017 Diversity and Inclusion Prize by the Royal Society of Chemistry (jointly awarded to Prof Dean Tantillo)
