= Little Thinker =

Little Thinker series is an interactive listening experience audiobook involving storytelling, education, music, and art, originally released through a company called Jerome Enterprises based in Florida. The Little Thinker tapes were a series of children's entertainment aiming to foster creativity and enthusiasm for learning. More than 3 million of the kits were sold.

== Description ==
In each tape, the series' hostess "Nancy", voiced by WBAL-TV meteorologist Nancy Hamilton, led the listener through an educational lesson on a topic chosen from a wide range of possibilities. These lessons usually took the form of an imaginary journey. Nancy would describe the adventure and ask the listener - addressed as "Little Thinker" - to imagine that they were experiencing it together. At regular intervals, the hostess would play music (from the Production music provider, Valentino Music) to allow the Little Thinker time to draw a picture of the events imagined in the previous segment.

== History ==
The Little Thinker tapes were sold in toy stores around the United States and Canada in audio cassette format. The tapes were sold individually and in four collections. The first six tapes, All About Fun Poems, All About Manners and Morals, All About Safety, All About Animals, All About Outer Space, and All About the Sea, were all released in 1978 and anthologized in the box set Little Thinker Tapes Vol. 1. The second set of six appeared in 1979. It included Think About the Circus, Think About Dinosaurs, Think About the Weather, Think About Super-sites in America, Think About Ways to Travel, and Think About Sports. By the release of Little Thinker Tapes Vol. 3 in 1982, the series had grown popular enough to support a fan club. Members were called "Thinkerniks," a term that replaced "Little Thinker" as Nancy's pet name for her listeners. The last six tapes, anthologized in the third volume, were Think About Life on the Farm, Think About the Desert, Think About the Old West, Think About the Planet Earth, Think About the World of Music, and Think About People on the Job. A final comprehensive set of Little Thinker Tapes was issued in 1983. However, at some point, a special tape called Think About Christmas was released, though never included in any collection.

In 2020 the current developer of Little Thinker Adventures produced the first new title in over 35 years. "Think About the Garden' was released for sale in July 2020. A new adventure, with new music, and hosted by Nance, the granddaughter of the original Nancy. (not truly, of course, but it's the story) In this new adventure, Nance leads the Thinkerniks on an adventure to shrink in size and explore the garden, above and below ground. Thinkerniks meet interesting characters along the way: worm, flower, butterfly, etc.

The 21st title in the series was released in the Summer/Fall of 2021. This new adventure is "Think About the Human Body". Nance is back to guide the Thinkerniks through the new adventure. The Little Thinker eats too much cake and ice cream at his birthday party and feels a bit sick. This adventure is all about what happens inside the body when your tummy hurts, and what can be done to help it. (https://www.littlethinkeradventures.com)

About year later, the newest title was released: "Think About Trash" tells the story of what happens to our trash after we discard it. It also mentions recycling and other things related to our refuse. Nance and the Little Thinker go on an adventure to learn about TRASH. Where does it come from? Where does it go? How does recycling work? Who picks up our trash. How much trash is processed.

This is the third new adventure in over 35 years. Nancy has turned over the task of leader to her granddaughter, Nance. No worries, though, your favorites like Windy and others are still here.

Little Thinkers are available in MP3, CD, and on a USB drive. They are also available on a special player that looks like a bunny, or a panda. In 2025, Little Thinkers became available by subscription. At a good discount, your Thinkernik can get a new title each month... you are free to skip or cancel at any time.
