= Anna Thompson =

Anna Thompson may refer to:

- Anna Thompson (athlete) (born 1976), Australian runner
- Anna Thompson (netball player) (born 1986), New Zealand netball player

== See also ==
- Anna Thomson (born 1953), American actress
- Anne Thompson (disambiguation)
