= Hannah Tompkins =

Second Lady of the United States

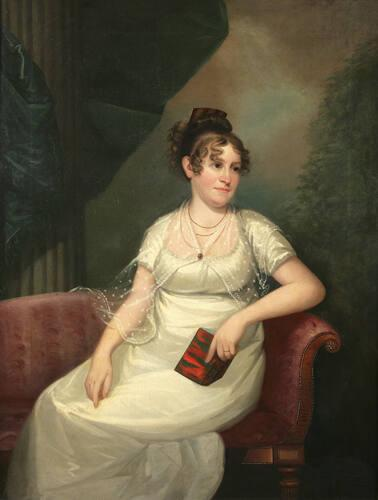
- Portrait of Tompkins by Ezra Ames, c. 1809

Second Lady of the United States
- In role March 4, 1817 – March 4, 1825
- Vice President: Daniel D. Tompkins
- Preceded by: Ann Gerry
- Succeeded by: Floride Calhoun

First Lady of New York
- In role July 1, 1807 – February 24, 1817
- Governor: Daniel Tompkins
- Preceded by: Gertrude Livingston
- Succeeded by: Margarita Van Valkenburg

Personal details
- Born: Hannah Minthorne; August 28, 1781 New York City, New York, British America
- Died: February 18, 1829 (aged 47) Tompkinsville, Staten Island, New York, U.S.
- Resting place: St. Mark's Church in-the-Bowery
- Spouse: Daniel Tompkins (m. 1798; died 1825)
- Children: 8, including Minthorne

Hannah Minthorne Tompkins (née Minthorne; August 28, 1781 – February 18, 1829) was the wife of Daniel D. Tompkins, the governor of New York and later vice president of the United States, and thus was the first lady of New York from 1807 to 1817 and then the second lady of the United States from 1817 to 1825.

== Biography ==
Born on August 28, 1781, Hannah Minthorne was the second child of Mangle Minthorne (1740–1824), a prominent Democratic-Republican Party member in New York City, by his second wife, Aryet Constable Minthorne (1743–1830), of New York City. On February 20, 1798, 16-year-old Hannah married Daniel D. Tompkins, a 23-year-old lawyer of the City. At the time of the marriage, her father was Assistant in the Common Council, and young Tompkins had designs on a political career. Hannah was ill the year before her husband became vice president, and she did not attend his inauguration.

From 1800 to 1814, the couple had eight children, including Arietta Minthorn Tompkins (born July 31, 1800), who married a son of Smith Thompson in 1818, and (Mangle) Minthorne Tompkins (December 26, 1807 – June 5, 1881), who was the Free Soil Party candidate for governor of New York in 1852. Their children Hannah and Minthorne were named after their mother, and Hannah and Minthorne streets in Staten Island were named for them.

Hannah died on February 18, 1829, in Tompkinsville, Staten Island. She and her husband are buried in the Minthorne family vault at St. Mark's-in-the-Bouwerie in lower Manhattan.

Honorary titles
Preceded by Gertrude Livingston	First Lady of New York; 1807–1817	Succeeded by Margarita Van Valkenburg
Vacant Title last held by Ann Gerry	Second Lady of the United States; 1817–1825	Succeeded by Floride Calhoun
