= Mexican War Midshipmen's Monument =

- United States Naval Academy
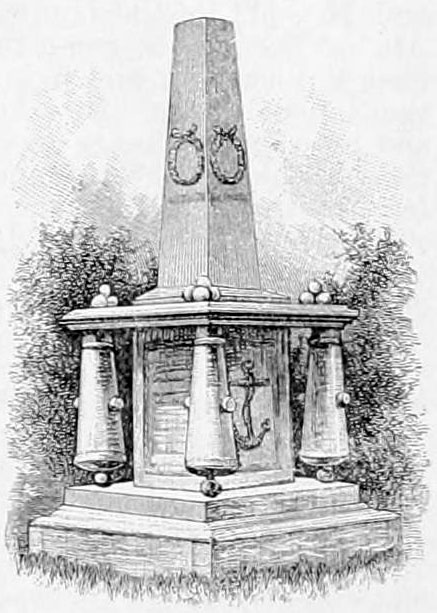
- Center campus of the US Naval Academy
- For the deaths of Midshipmen Shubrick, Clemson, Hynson, and Pillsbury
- Unveiled: 1848
- Location: Annapolis, MD near the Naval Academy Chapel
- Designed by: Unknown

The Mexican War Midshipmen's Monument at the intersection of Stribling Walk and Chapel Walk, center campus of the US Naval Academy, is in memory of two passed midshipmen (H. A. Clemson, J. R. Hynson) who lost their lives when the brig Somers sank in 1846, one midshipman (J. W. Pillsbury) who drowned near 'Vera Cruz' in 1846, and another midshipman (T. B. Shubrick) who lost his life in the siege of Veracruz in 1847.

The monument is made of marble and measures 218 by 78 by 78 inches (5.5 m × 2.0 m × 2.0 m). Often shortened to the Mexican Monument, it is also known as the Clemson Monument, and is by an unknown designer. (Note: The Smithsonian American Art Museum attributes the monument to John W. Stephenson. Stephenson, a modern sculptor, is shown as born in 1929, some eighty one years after the monument was unveiled.) It was an 1848 gift by the Academy's Brigade of Midshipmen.

== Description ==
"A marble obelisk with a bronze wreath on each side is mounted on top of a square marble base adorned with four marble cannon tubes positioned vertically at each corner. Surrounding the base are four cannons, one pointed from each corner."

The surrounding horizontal cannons are Spanish 12-pounder smooth-bore bronze guns captured in 1847 by the US Navy from the Mexicans in California.

== Inscriptions ==
One name is on each side of the obelisk: CLEMSON·SHUBRICK·PILLSBURY·HYNSON. Each name is surmounted by a leaf wreath.

On the monument's base, below Clemson:

To passed Midshipmen
H. A. CLEMSON.
and
J. R. HYNSON.
lost with U.S. Brig. Somers
off Vera Cruz
Dec. 8th, 1846
This monument is Erected
by
passed and other Midshipmen
of the U.S. Navy
as a tribute of respect
1848

On the monument's base, below Pillsbury:

To Midshipmen
J. W. PILLBURY.
and
T. B. SHUBRICK.
the former drowned off Vera Cruz
July 24th, 1846
the latter killed at the Naval Battery
near Vera Cruz
March 25th, 1847
while in charge of their duties
This monument is Erected
by
passed and other Midshipmen
as a tribute of respect
1848

On the monument's base's sides below Hynson and Shubrick are stylized fouled anchors.
