= USS Clemson =

USS Clemson may refer to the following ships operated by the United States:

- USS Clemson (DD-186) was a Clemson-class destroyer launched in 1918 and sold in 1946
- USNS Clemson (T-AG-184) was a planned Forward Depot Ship but the program was canceled in 1966
