= Assistive Media =

Nonprofit organization

Assistive Media, Inc. is a nonprofit Internet-based reading service to serve people with visual and reading impairments.

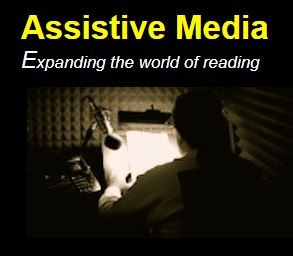
Assistive Media: Expanding the world of reading.

Assistive Media was founded in Ann Arbor, Michigan, in 1996 by David Erdody as a 501(c)(3) nonprofit organization. According to Erdody, it was inspired by his father's diagnosis of diabetic retinopathy, an avid reader of The New Yorker magazine and audiobooks. He considers Duvall Hecht's Books on Tape (company) and the narration style of Grover Gardner to have had a major influence on his admiration for the audiobook format . Utilizing volunteer readers and work-study students from the University of Michigan, Assistive Media began producing and distributing spoken-word recordings of otherwise inaccessible materials on audio cassette to The Washtenaw County, Michigan Library for the Blind and Physically Disabled, a participating library of the National Library Service for the Blind and Physically Handicapped of the Library of Congress.

In 1998, with the advent of online digital audio formats such as RealAudio, direct distribution of recordings shifted to the Assistive Media website and has received praise from the at-large online disabled community and also from David McCullough, Mark Cuban, and John Perry Barlow. In 1999, Assistive Media was awarded RealNetworks, Inc.'s Progressive Streamers Award as the best nonprofit streaming web site of the year over Peter Gabriel's Witness (organization).

Assistive Media has produced spoken-word recordings of works of nonfiction literature and long-form journalism from The Atlantic, Granta, Harper's Magazine, The New York Review of Books, The New Yorker, Scientific American, and Wired. It is considered one of the longest continuously running Internet-based nonprofit services. In 2011, Assistive Media began recording unabridged full-length books of biographical, historical, and contemporary nonfiction for online delivery to libraries that specialize in books for the blind . Assistive Media is also affiliated with LifeScienceAudio.com.
