= Anne Thompson MacDonald =

- Anne T. MacDonald, from a 1982 newspaper photograph.
- Born: Anne Hunter Thompson; December 15, 1896
- Died: October 9, 1993 (aged 96); Huntington, New York
- Occupation: Philanthropist

Anne Thompson MacDonald (December 15, 1896 – October 9, 1993) was an American philanthropist, founder of Recording for the Blind.

== Early life ==
Anne Hunter Thompson was the daughter of Robert O. Thompson and Frances Walton Thompson. She was raised in the Brooklyn home of her uncle, banker John J. Walton.

== Career ==
During World War II, Anne Thompson MacDonald was assistant director of the Nurses' Aide Corps of the American Red Cross. Immediately after the war, she was active in helping released prisoners of war return to home. She was a member of the Women's Auxiliary at the New York Public Library, when she learned about the need for audio books for newly blind veterans of the war. She founded The National Committee for Recording for the Blind in 1948 (incorporated in 1951), in New York City, with the motto "Education is a right, not a privilege". She established recording studios in other cities, and oversaw a system involving thousands of volunteers recording, duplicating, cataloging and mailing vinyl records (and later cassette tapes) for blind readers.

In 1973, she was awarded the Migel Medal by the American Foundation for the Blind. In 1983, the Anne T. MacDonald Center opened in Princeton, New Jersey, as the new headquarters of Recording for the Blind. In 1988, MacDonald was awarded an honorary doctorate from Yale University, for her lifetime of service.

== Personal life and legacy ==
In 1919, Anne Thompson married stockbroker Ranald Hugh MacDonald Jr. They had two children, Ranald and Anne. She was widowed when Ranald MacDonald died in 1988; she died in 1993, aged 96 years, a nursing home in Huntington, New York. In 1995, Recording For the Blind rebranded itself as Recording for the Blind & Dyslexic (RFB&D) and in 2011, Recording for the Blind & Dyslexic rebranded itself as Learning Ally.
