= Henry A. Clemson =

United States Navy officer (1818–1846)

Henry A. Clemson (July 12, 1818 – December 8, 1846) was an officer in the United States Navy in the early 19th century. Clemson died at sea during the Mexican American War (1846) and was memorialized on the Mexican War Midshipmen's Monument and the naming of a naval destroyer, USS Clemson (DD-186).

== Early life ==
Clemson was born in New Jersey to Ann Maria (Oliver) and Captain Eli B. Clemson.

== Naval service ==
He served on several ships throughout his short career. The following is his known service based on newspaper accounts.

In 1837, he was midshipman on the frigate Independence with Commander John B. Nicholson.

In 1840, he was a midshipman on the ship Falmouth which was returning from the Pacific and Rio Janeiro with Captain J. M. McKeever.

Clemson requested permission to sit for the midshipman exams in 1841 at the Philadelphia Naval Asylum. He passed the exams in 1842 which made him eligible for promotion to lieutenant. He served on the Concord in 1842 as passed midshipman. The Concord ran aground in November 1842 and then was abandoned. Clemson returned to the United States on the barque Margaret Hugg along with surviving crew.

By late 1843, he was serving as passed midshipman on the Raritan with Commander Francis Gregory, Esq.

In January 1844, Clemson served as passed midshipman on the Preble with Commander Thomas W. Fennelon, arriving in Haiti in June 1944 to protect the commercial interests of the United States. By late 1844, Clemson began service on the ship, Erie, with Lt Commander Charles C. Turner. The Erie was taking supplies to the west coast of Africa.

In May 1845, Clemson was serving as acting master on the Truxtun with Commander Henry Bruce, when the Truxtun captured the slaver ship, Spitfire.

By March 1846, Clemson was serving as passed midshipman on the Potomac with Captain John H. Aulick. By late November 1846, Clemson was serving as acting master on the brig Somers with Lt. Commander Raphael Semmes. The Somers had been dispatched for blockade duty in the Gulf of Mexico during the Mexican-American War.

Clemson, along with 38 other crew, drowned on December 8, 1846 when Somers capsized off Vera Cruz in a squall while chasing a blockade runner.

== In memoriam ==
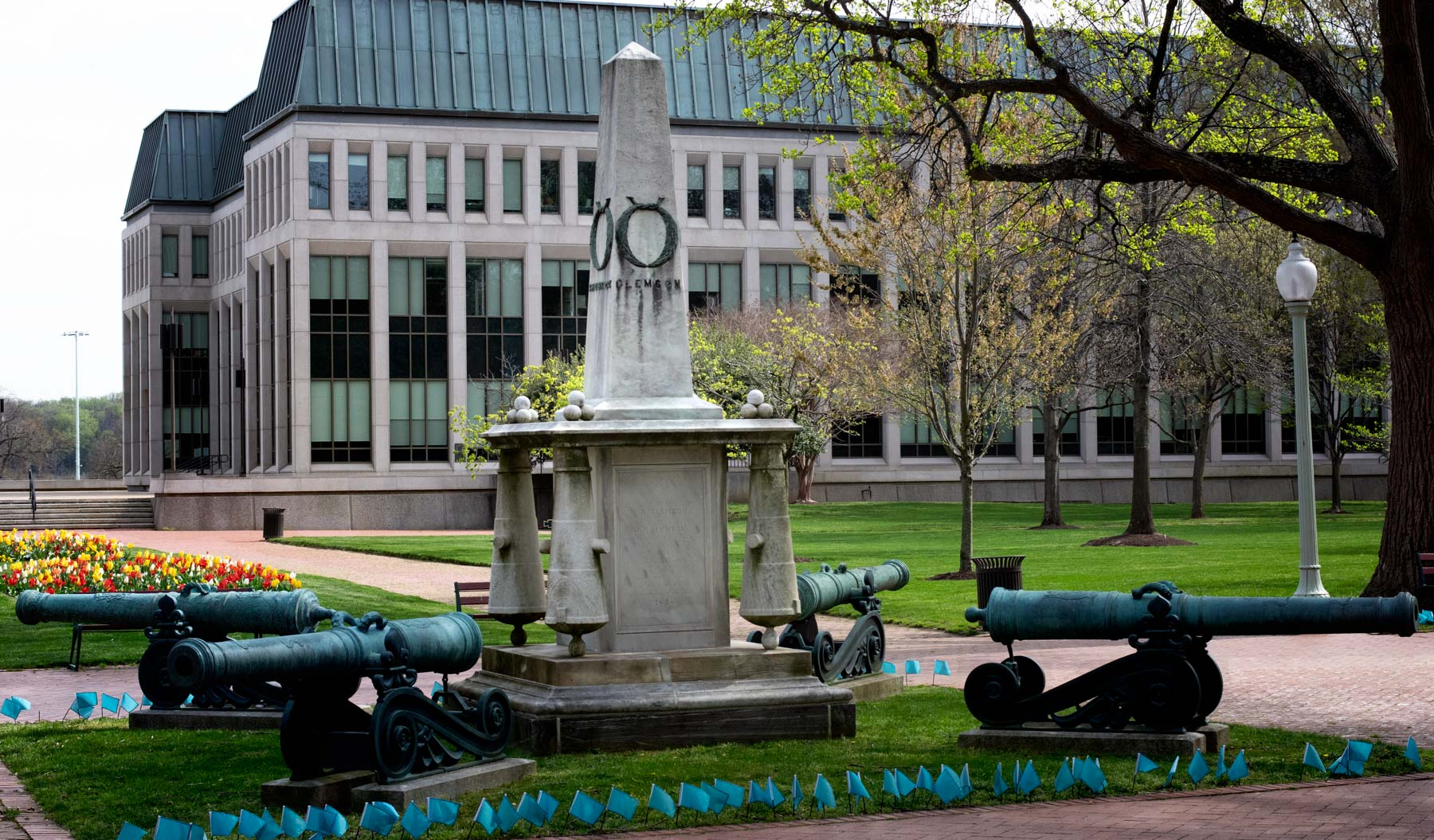
Mexican War Midshipmen's Monument at the United States Naval Academy, Annapolis, Maryland.

The Mexican War Midshipmen's Monument was erected at the United States Naval Academy in 1848 in the memory of Clemson and three other midshipmen who died at Vera Cruz. The monument has also been called the Clemson Monument since the side with Clemson's name faces the Academy Yard and is first seen by the midshipmen (students) on the way to classes.

USS Clemson (DD-186) was named in his honor.
