= Fort Hill (Clemson University, South Carolina) =

Historic house in South Carolina, United States

- Fort Hill (John C. Calhoun House)
- U.S. National Register of Historic Places
- U.S. National Historic Landmark
- U.S. Historic district – Contributing property
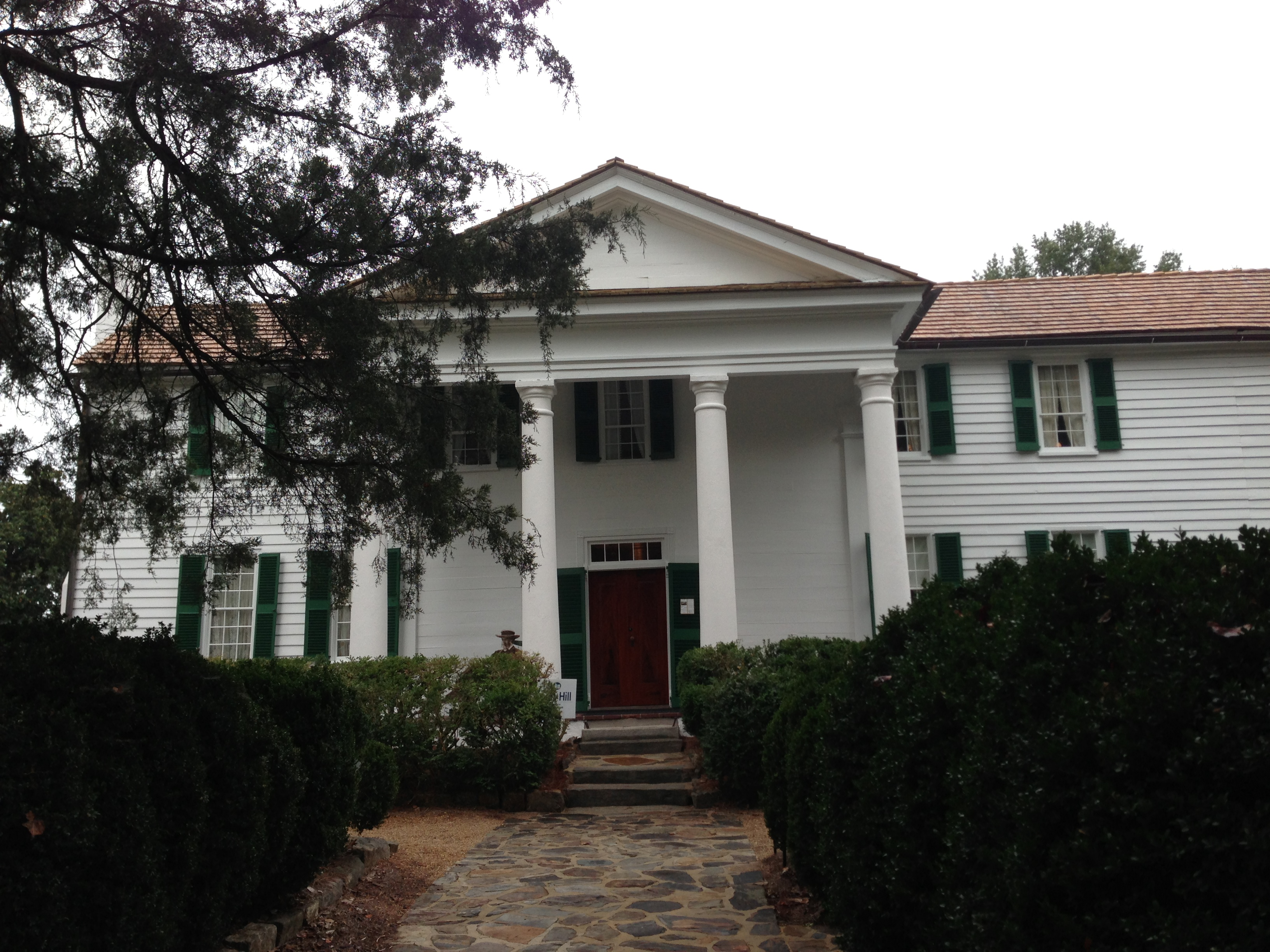

- Location within South Carolina Location within the United States
- Location: Clemson University campus, Clemson postal address, South Carolina
- Coordinates: 34°40′40.5″N 82°50′20″W
- Built: 1802
- Architectural style: Greek Revival
- Part of: Clemson University Historic District II (ID89002139)
- NRHP reference No.: 66000708

Significant dates
- Added to NRHP: October 15, 1966
- Designated NHL: December 19, 1960
- Designated CP: January 4, 1990

Fort Hill, also known as the John C. Calhoun House and Library, is a National Historic Landmark on the Clemson University campus in Pickens County, South Carolina, United States, near the City of Clemson.

From 1825-1850, the house was the home of noted proponent of slavery and constitutional Nullification, John C. Calhoun, the 7th Vice President of the United States.

Clemson University was established on the Fort Hill slave-operated plantation site in 1889, and in accordance with the terms of its inheritance, has maintained the house and its immediate parcel as a museum and library — all that remains of what originally was an approximately 1,000 acre plantation estate.

== History ==
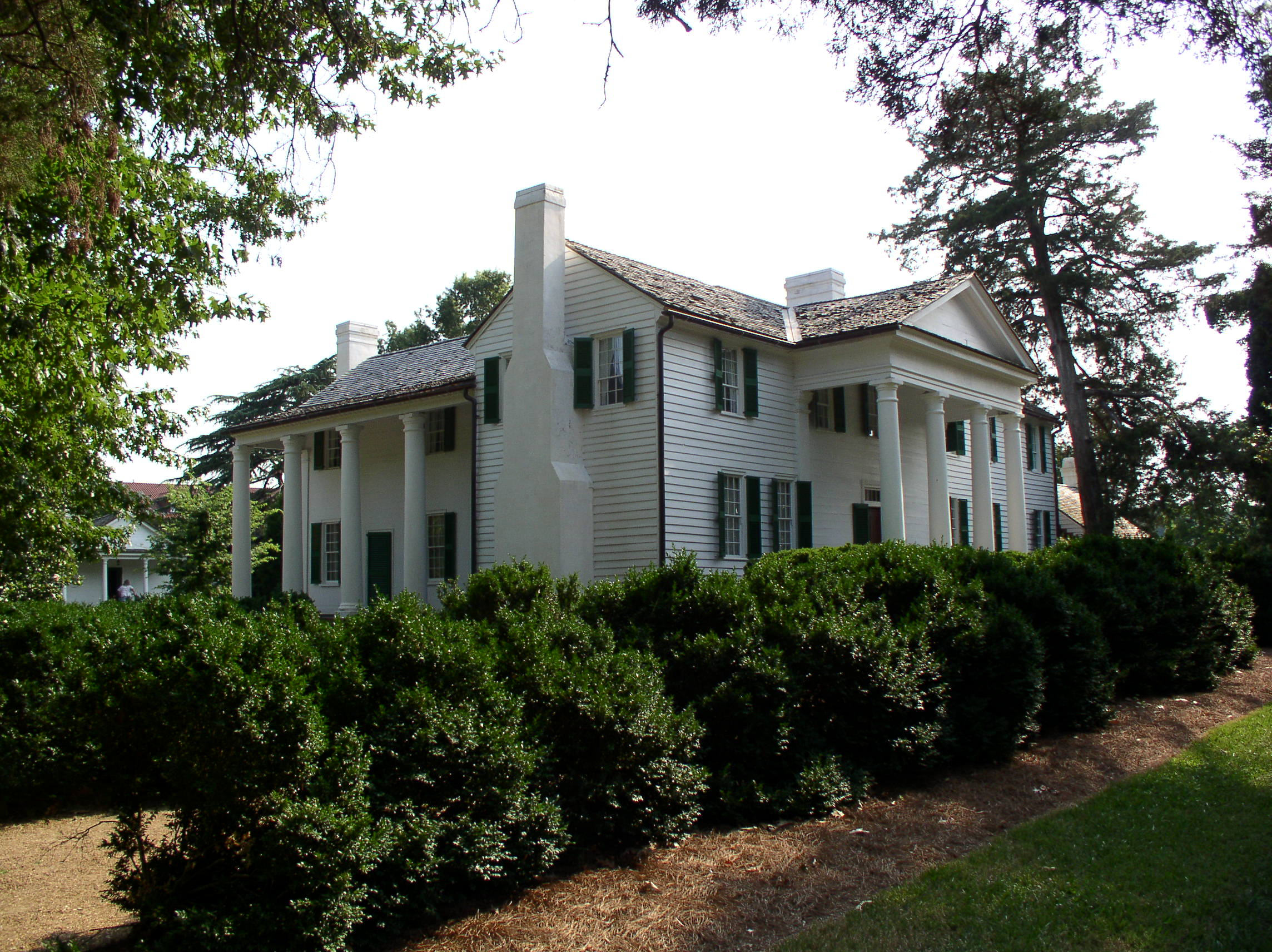
Fort Hill

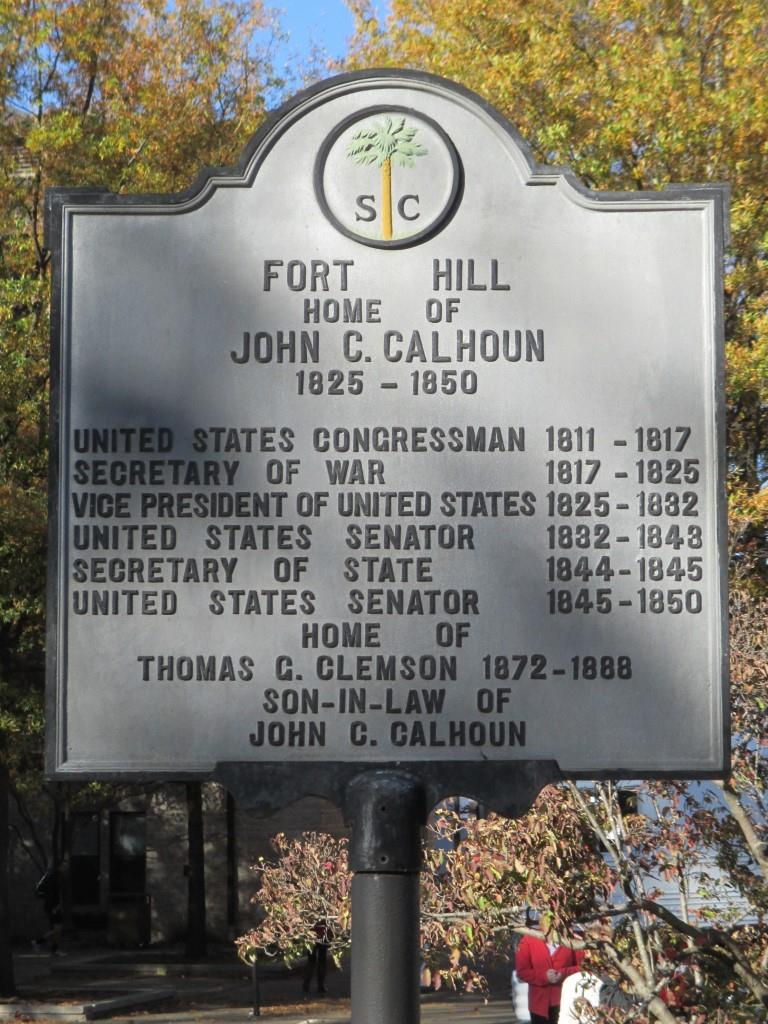
State historic marker for Fort Hill

The house was originally built as a four-room house about 1803 and was called Clergy Hall by Dr. James McElhenny, who was the pastor of Hopewell Presbyterian Church. The house later became the home of John C. Calhoun and his wife Floride Calhoun in 1825. Calhoun enlarged it to 14 rooms and renamed it Fort Hill for nearby Fort Rutledge, which was built around 1776. The architectural style is Greek Revival with Federal detailing and with simple interior detailing.

After John Calhoun's death in 1850, the property and the 50 slaves there passed to his wife to be shared with three of her children: Cornelia, John, and Anna Maria, wife of Thomas Green Clemson. Anna sold her share to Floride Calhoun. Floride Calhoun sold the plantation to her son, Andrew Pickens Calhoun, and held the mortgage. After Andrew died in 1865, she filed for foreclosure against Andrew's heirs before her death in 1866.

After lengthy legal proceedings, the plantation was auctioned at Walhalla in 1872. The executor of her estate won the auction, which was divided among her surviving heirs. Her daughter, Anna Clemson, received the residence with about 814 acres (329 ha) and her great-granddaughter, Floride Isabella Lee, received about 288 acres (117 ha). Thomas Green and Anna Clemson moved into Fort Hill in 1872. After Anna's death in 1875, Thomas Green Clemson inherited Fort Hill.

In his 1888 will, Clemson bequeathed more than 814 acres (329 ha) of the Fort Hill estate to the State of South Carolina for an agricultural college with a stipulation that the dwelling house "shall never be torn down or altered; but shall be kept in repair with all articles of furniture and vesture...and shall always be open for inspection of visitors." Clemson University has operated Fort Hill as a house museum as stipulated in the will. The house is all that remains of what was once an extensive plantation estate.

The home was designated a National Historic Landmark in 1960.

Fort Hill was closed for a two-year restoration project and was reopened in the spring of 2003. Fort Hill was named a national treasure by the Save America's Treasures program, and its artifacts are currently undergoing a comprehensive conservation program funded by this federal grant and matching funds.

== See also ==
- List of National Historic Landmarks in South Carolina
- National Register of Historic Places listings in Pickens County, South Carolina
