= Learning Ally =

Non-profit volunteer organization

- Founded: 1948
- Founders: Anne Thompson MacDonald
- Type: 501(c)(3)
- Location: Princeton, New Jersey, United States
- Region served: United States
- Website: https://LearningAlly.org

Learning Ally, previously named Recording for the Blind & Dyslexic (RFB&D), originally named Recording for the Blind (RFB), is a non-profit volunteer organization operating nationwide in the United States. It produces and maintains a library of educational accessible audiobooks for people who cannot effectively read standard print because of visual impairment, dyslexia, or other disabilities.

== Services ==
A Learning Ally member's personal audiobook library.

Learning Ally provides services to individuals with print disabilities such as dyslexia and visual impairments, as well as the people who support them. This includes services for parents such as phone consultations, webinars, support networks and information on specialists and tutors; and services for teachers such as classroom management tools (Teacher Ally), professional development workshops and lesson plans. Learning Ally also offers a digital audiobook library which in 2015 contained over 80,000 titles, including textbooks on specialty and academic subjects, from kindergarten through post-graduate and professional. Borrowers must provide a certification of their disability, and they may borrow titles through an individual membership, through their association with a member institution such as a school, or both. In recent years, approved borrowers had paid no charges for this service through funding which was provided by the U.S. Department of Education. Since the federal appropriation was eliminated in 2011, Learning Ally began to require individuals to pay an annual membership fee, currently $135, and hardship waivers are also granted to individuals who qualify for them. Audio software for mainstream mobile devices and the group's Link software for Mac and PC are available to members free of charge. At various fee levels, Institutional memberships are also provided to public and private schools, colleges and universities. The company awards four types of scholarship prizes to students who use its assistive technology.

== Software ==
Learning Ally Link is an educational reading app, designed for students who learn through listening, including students with dyslexia, learning disabilities or visual impairment.

== Explore 1in5 ==
In 2015, Learning Ally launched the Explore1in5.org site, a student-driven community hub to drive public awareness of dyslexia. The site offers resources and information about dyslexia, including:

- Video statements and stories by children and teens describing their dyslexia experiences
- Common misconceptions and myths about dyslexia
- Opportunities for site visitors to contribute their own stories by uploading a video or writing a blog entry
- Ideas and materials to help raise awareness of dyslexia
