= Floride Calhoun =

Second Lady of the United States from 1825 to 1832

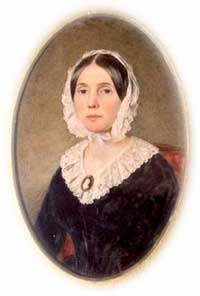

Second Lady of the United States
- In role March 4, 1825 – December 28, 1832
- Vice President: John C. Calhoun
- Preceded by: Hannah Tompkins
- Succeeded by: Letitia Tyler

Personal details
- Born: Floride Bonneau Colhoun; February 15, 1792 Charleston, South Carolina, U.S.
- Died: July 25, 1866 (aged 74) Pendleton, South Carolina, U.S.
- Resting place: St. Paul's Episcopal Church Cemetery, Pendleton, South Carolina
- Spouse: John Calhoun (m. 1811; died 1850)
- Children: 10 (including Anna Maria Calhoun Clemson)
- Parent(s): John E. Colhoun; Floride Bonneau

Floride Bonneau Calhoun (née Colhoun; February 15, 1792 – July 25, 1866) was the second lady of the United States from 1825 to 1832. She was the wife of Vice President of the United States, John C. Calhoun.

She was known for her leading role in the Petticoat affair, which occurred during her husband's service as vice president of the United States. In that role, Mrs. Calhoun led the wives of other Cabinet members in ostracizing Peggy Eaton, the wife of Secretary of War John Eaton, whom they considered a woman of low morals. The affair helped damage relations between John C. Calhoun and President Andrew Jackson, and effectively ended any legitimate chance of John Calhoun becoming president of the United States.

== Early life and family ==
Floride Bonneau Colhoun was born to Floride Bonneau and John E. Colhoun, who served as a U.S. senator from 1801 to 1802. She was a niece of Rebecca Colhoun Pickens, wife of Andrew Pickens. On January 8, 1811, she married John C. Calhoun, her first-cousin-once-removed (her father's first cousin). Soon after their marriage, her husband was elected to Congress, leaving his wife in charge of his plantation, Fort Hill in present-day Clemson, South Carolina. Within the next eighteen years, she gave birth to 10 children, five daughters, of whom three died in infancy, and five sons,

- Andrew Pickens Calhoun (1811–1865)
- Floride Pure Calhoun (1814–1815)
- Jane Calhoun (1816–1816)
- Anna Maria Calhoun (1817–1875)
- Elizabeth Calhoun (1819–1820)
- Patrick Calhoun (1821–1858)
- John Caldwell Calhoun Jr. (1823–1850)
- Martha Cornelia Calhoun (1824–1857)
- James Edward Calhoun (1826–1861)
- William Lowndes Calhoun (1829–1858).

Her fourth child, Anna Maria married Thomas Green Clemson, founder of Clemson University in South Carolina.

In 1817, Floride Calhoun accompanied her husband to Washington upon his appointment as Secretary of War in the Cabinet of President James Monroe.

== Second Lady of the United States (1825-1832) ==
Eight years later in 1825, Calhoun became Second Lady of the United States, following her husband's election as vice president, serving in that role until his resignation in 1832.

=== Petticoat affair ===
During her tenure as Second Lady, she took the lead in a social war against Peggy Eaton, the wife of Secretary of War John Eaton, in what became known as the Petticoat affair.

Calhoun had organized a coalition among the wives of Jackson cabinet members against Peggy Eaton, who Calhoun believed had committed adultery and was acting irresponsibly in Washington. Historian John F. Marszalek explains why Washington society found Eaton unacceptable:

She did not know her place; she forthrightly spoke up about anything that came to her mind, even topics of which women were supposed to be ignorant. She thrust herself into the world in a manner inappropriate for woman.... Accept her, and society was in danger of disruption. Accept this uncouth, impure, forward, worldly woman, and the wall of virtue and morality would be breached and society would have no further defenses against the forces of frightening change. Margaret Eaton was not that important in herself; it was what she represented that constituted the threat. Proper women had no choice; they had to prevent her acceptance into society as part of their defense of that society’s morality.

President Jackson was opposed by Vice President Calhoun and most of his own cabinet. The result was the resignation of all but one Cabinet member in 1831. It permanently destroyed friendly relations between Vice President Calhoun and President Jackson, and changed the trajectory of John Calhoun's career.

According to historian Daniel Howe, the revolt against Eaton and the president led by Floride Calhoun influenced the emergence of feminism. The Cabinet wives insisted that the interests and honor of all women were at stake. They believed a responsible woman never should accord a man sexual favors without the assurance that went with marriage. A woman who broke that code was dishonorable and unacceptable. Howe notes that this was the feminist spirit that in the next decade shaped the women's rights movement. The aristocratic wives of European diplomats in Washington shrugged the matter off; they had their own national interests to uphold.

== Return to South Carolina ==
Following her husband's resignation as vice president and election to the United States Senate in 1832, Mrs. Calhoun returned to Fort Hill, resuming her former status as a plantation mistress, leaving the role of Second Lady of the United States vacant until 1841 because both of her husband's two immediate successors as vice president, Martin Van Buren and Richard Mentor Johnson, were unmarried during their time in office.

Her husband died in 1850. In 1854, she sold the plantation to her oldest son, Andrew Pickens Calhoun, and held the mortgage. A year later in 1855, she moved to a smaller house in Pendleton, South Carolina, which she dubbed Mi Casa. She outlived six of her seven surviving children. After Andrew Calhoun died in 1865, she filed for foreclosure against Andrew's heirs before her death the following year.

== Death and protracted estate issues ==
Floride Calhoun died on July 25, 1866, and was buried in St. Paul's Episcopal Church Cemetery in Pendleton, South Carolina, near her children, but separate from her husband who is buried at St. Philip's Episcopal Church Cemetery in Charleston. The Fort Hill plantation was auctioned at Walhalla in 1872 after lengthy legal proceedings. The executor of her estate won the auction, which was divided among her surviving heirs. Her daughter Anna Maria Calhoun Clemson and son-in-law Thomas Green Clemson received about three-quarters of the plantation, including the house, and her great-granddaughter, Floride Isabella Lee, received the remaining balance. When Thomas Green Clemson died in 1888, he left Fort Hill and the surrounding land to the state of South Carolina to form a higher seminary of learning. The college Clemson established eventually became known as Clemson University.

Honorary titles
Preceded by Hannah Tompkins	Second Lady of the United States; 1825–1832	Vacant Title next held by Letitia Tyler
