= Ann Gerry =

Second Lady of the United States from 1813 to 1814

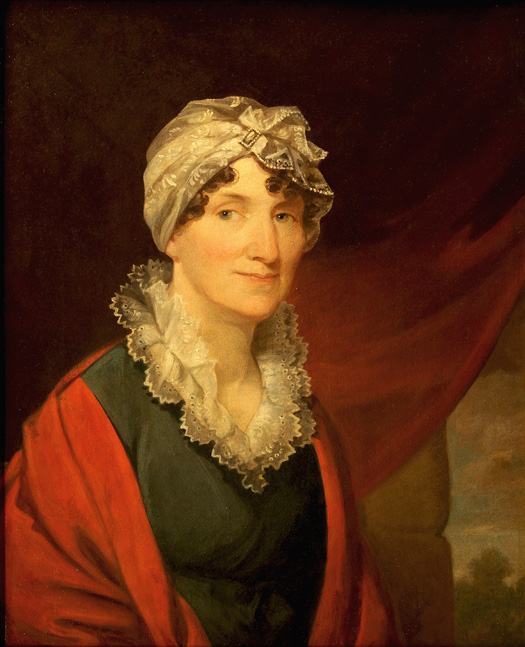
- Portrait of Gerry

Second Lady of the United States
- In role March 4, 1813 – November 23, 1814
- Vice President: Elbridge Gerry
- Preceded by: Abigail Adams
- Succeeded by: Hannah Tompkins

First Lady of Massachusetts
- In role June 10, 1810 – June 5, 1812
- Governor: Elbridge Gerry
- Preceded by: Rebecca Gore
- Succeeded by: Sarah Strong

Personal details
- Born: Ann Thompson; August 12, 1763 New York City, New York, British America
- Died: March 17, 1849 (aged 85) New Haven, Connecticut, U.S.
- Resting place: Grove Street Cemetery, New Haven, Connecticut
- Spouse: Elbridge Gerry (m. 1786; died 1814)
- Children: 10, including Thomas Russell Gerry

Ann Thompson Gerry (/ˈɡɛri/ GHERR-ee; August 12, 1763 – March 17, 1849) was the second lady of the United States from 1813 to 1814 as the wife of Vice President Elbridge Gerry.

== Life ==
Ann Thompson was the daughter of James Thompson (1727–1812) a wealthy Irishman who made his fortune in the merchant trade, and Catharine (Walton) Thompson, daughter of a wealthy New Yorker. By 1750, Thompson's business was based in New York City, where Ann was born in 1763. She was educated in Dublin, Ireland, while her older brothers were educated in Scotland and eventually joined the British Army. Upon completion of her education in the mid-1780s she returned to New York, where some called her "the most beautiful woman in the United States". There she caught the eye of Elbridge Gerry, a Marblehead, Massachusetts politician twenty years her elder who was serving in the Confederation Congress. Their romance was apparently well underway by late 1785, and they were married on January 12, 1786, at New York's Trinity Church.

The couple had ten children between 1787 and 1801 (three died young). Her husband was frequently concerned over her health, but was also frequently away. The family finances were troubled in the later years of her husband's life; debts that his brother had incurred and Gerry had guaranteed were only paid off from the salary he received as Vice President of the United States between 1813 and his death in 1814, leaving the widow with an estate that was rich in land and poor in cash. Massachusetts Senator Christopher Gore proposed that the vice presidential salary would be paid to her for the rest of her life, but Congress rejected the idea because it might set a precedent for such payments.

She was thereafter supported by her children, living with her son, James Thompson Gerry, the commander of the USS Albany, and at least two of her daughters at 17 Temple Court, in New Haven. She died in New Haven, Connecticut on March 17, 1849. She was buried in New Haven's Grove Street Cemetery.

Honorary titles
Vacant Title last held by Abigail Adams	Second Lady of the United States; 1813–1814	Vacant Title next held by Hannah Tompkins
