= SS D. M. Clemson =

Two merchant ships have been named SS D. M. Clemson.

- SS D. M. Clemson (1903), U.S. propeller, steamer, bulk freighter, Official No. 157703. Sank in 1908 on Lake Superior with the loss of all hands.
- SS D. M. Clemson (1917), U.S. propeller, steamer, bulk freighter, Official No. 214599. Scrapped in 1980, in Thunder Bay, Ontario.
