= Anne M. Thompson (politician) =

American politician

Anne M. Thompson was a state legislator in Colorado. A Republican, she represented Crowley County and Otero County from 1957-1960. She published a newspaper in Rocky Ford, Colorado. She was a Republican.

She wrote an article for the Journal of the American Association of University Women published in 1958.

Some sources identify her as co-publisher of the Daily Gazette. She won awards.
