= Anna Maria Calhoun Clemson =

American woman (1817–1875)

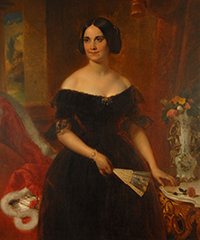
- Born: Anna Maria Calhoun; February 13, 1817; Willington, South Carolina, U.S.
- Died: September 22, 1875 (aged 58); Fort Hill, South Carolina, U.S.
- Resting place: Saint Philips Episcopal Church Cemetery
- Education: South Carolina Female Collegiate Institute
- Spouse: Thomas Green Clemson (m. 1838–1875)
- Children: 4, including Floride
- Parents: John C. Calhoun (father); Floride Calhoun (mother)

Anna Maria Calhoun Clemson (February 13, 1817 – September 22, 1875) was the daughter of John C. Calhoun and Floride Calhoun (née Colhoun), and the wife of Thomas Green Clemson, the founder of Clemson University.

== Early life ==
Calhoun was born on the Bath plantation in the Abbeville District of South Carolina, in February 1817. She was one of seven children. She adored her father, politician John C. Calhoun, and remained close to him until his death in 1850. Her early education was through her surroundings and family, at a day school in Edgefield, South Carolina, then later at the South Carolina Female Collegiate Institute, in central South Carolina. Calhoun stayed at the South Carolina Female Collegiate Institute for about a year before she returned to her family's home at Fort Hill. When she returned, Calhoun taught her younger brothers how to read and write.

== Marriage and children ==
In 1835, Calhoun moved to Washington, D.C., to be a copyist for her father, with the notion that she would never marry. In early spring 1838, Calhoun met Thomas Green Clemson. The couple married on November 13, 1838, in Fort Hill, South Carolina. Clemson's job called him to Washington and the newlyweds moved to Philadelphia. The couple had four children. Their first child, whose name is not known, died as an infant in 1839. Then they had a son, John Calhoun (born 1841) and Floride Elizabeth (born 1842). A fourth child, daughter Cornelia (known as “Nina”) was born in 1855. She died in infancy.

Shortly after the birth of Floride Elizabeth, Clemson accepted a position in Belgium. The Clemson family moved overseas for the time. As Clemson became a high-ranking diplomat to the Kingdom of Belgium, Calhoun quickly became homesick and wished to return to her father. She had never been separated from him for an extended period of time. Calhoun had a unique fascination with her father. Before her marriage to Clemson, Calhoun said to a house maid, “You who know my idolatry, for my father, can sympathize with my feelings.” (Aug. 2, 1838) The Clemson family remained overseas from 1844 to 1852 and returned home to buy one hundred acres in Maryland, four miles from Washington, DC. The couple named their new home in Maryland "The Home”.

== Civil War years ==
After their return to the United States, Clemson served in the Confederate Army, leaving Calhoun to care for the children and the farm. Calhoun's mother still lived alone in Pendleton, South Carolina, during the Civil War. During this time, Calhoun needed to travel back and forth from "The Home" to her mother, meaning she was crossing hostile lines. Calhoun and Floride packed several possessions and temporarily moved into a five-room home outside of Beltsville, Maryland, which was near Baltimore. Although she was closer to her mother, Calhoun was concerned about the Clemson family's possessions that remained in her family's estate. Calhoun and Floride decided to pack up their remaining possessions and to mail them to relatives, hoping that their items would make it through the war. Calhoun never received trouble from either the North or the South while crossing borderlines to see her mother, until 1865 when she moved back to Pendleton.

== Later years and death ==
In 1871, Thomas Clemson retired and he and Calhoun moved to Fort Hill, South Carolina. That same year, both of the couple's children died within 17 days of one another. Daughter Floride, who had married Gideon Lee Jr., the son of politician Gideon Lee, died on July 28, 1871, after a long illness. Son John died of injuries he suffered from a train wreck on August 10 at the age of 29.

On September 22, 1875, Calhoun died of a heart attack at Fort Hill. She was buried with her family in the Saint Paul's Episcopal Church Cemetery in Pendleton, South Carolina.

== Legacy ==
In the years preceding Anna Calhoun Clemson's death, she and her husband discussed starting an agricultural college in upstate South Carolina. They decided that the college would be situated in Fort Hill and that John C. Calhoun's house would remain on the land. The house still stands at the center of Clemson University's campus. Anna's largest effort to help start the college before her death was the creation of a committee to gather support around the state. One of the main points of the committee was to spread the word that the college was to be built in the legacy of her father, John C. Calhoun, who did much for the state of South Carolina. In honor of his wife, Thomas Green Clemson founded Clemson Agricultural College 1889 and opened in July 1893, with a student body of 446 men.
