= Anne Thompson (artist) =

American artist

Anne Thompson is a visual artist and Director and Curator of the Suzanne Lemberg Usdan Gallery at Bennington College. Thompson is the founder of the I-70 Sign Show project, using highway billboards as an artistic medium. She received an MFA from the Yale School of Art in 2002 and taught at the University of Missouri from 2006 to 2017 before becoming a faculty member at Bennington. She is represented by Hudson Franklin gallery in New York City.
