= USS Clemson (DD-186) =

Clemson-class destroyer

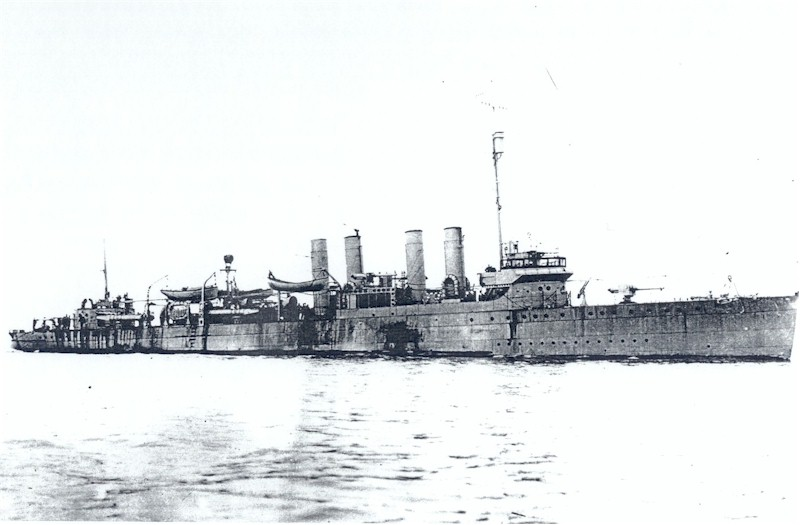
- USS Clemson

History

United States
- Name: Clemson
- Namesake: Henry A. Clemson
- Builder: Newport News Shipbuilding & Dry Dock Company
- Laid down: 11 May 1918
- Launched: 5 September 1918
- Commissioned: 29 December 1919
- Decommissioned: 30 June 1922
- Reclassified: Small seaplane tender, AVP-17, 15 November 1939
- Recommissioned: 12 July 1940
- Reclassified: Seaplane tender destroyer, AVD-4, 6 August 1940; High-speed transport, APD-31, 7 March 1944; Destroyer, DD-186,17 July 1945
- Decommissioned: 12 October 1945
- Stricken: 24 October 1945
- Fate: Sold for scrap 21 November 1946

General characteristics
- Class & type: Clemson-class destroyer
- Displacement: 1,215 tons
- Length: 314 ft 5 in (95.83 m)
- Beam: 31 ft 9 in (9.68 m)
- Draft: 9 ft 10 in (3.00 m)
- Propulsion: 26,500 shp (19,800 kW); geared turbines, 2 screws
- Speed: 35 kn (65 km/h; 40 mph)
- Range: 4,900 nmi (9,100 km; 5,600 mi) at 15 kn (28 km/h; 17 mph)
- Boats & landing craft carried: 4 LCP landing craft
- Complement: 101 officers and enlisted
- Armament: 4 × 4 in (100 mm)/50 cal. guns; 3 × 3 in (76 mm)/23 cal. guns; 12 × 21 inch (533 mm) torpedo tubes

USS Clemson (DD-186/AVP-17/AVD-4/APD-31) was the lead ship of her class of destroyers which served in the United States Navy during World War II. She was named for Midshipman Henry A. Clemson (1820–1846), who was lost at sea when the brig USS Somers capsized in a sudden squall off Vera Cruz on 8 December 1846 while chasing a blockade runner. Entering service in 1919, the ship had a brief active life before placed in reserve in 1922. Converted to an aircraft tender in 1939, the ship reactivated in 1940. In 1943, Clemson reconverted to a destroyer and served in the Battle of the Atlantic during World War II. In 1944, the ship was converted into a high speed transport and transferred to the Pacific taking part in several invasions. Following the end of the war, the ship was taken out of service again and sold for scrapping in 1946. She is the only ship in the United States Navy to have received the name Clemson.

== Construction and commissioning ==
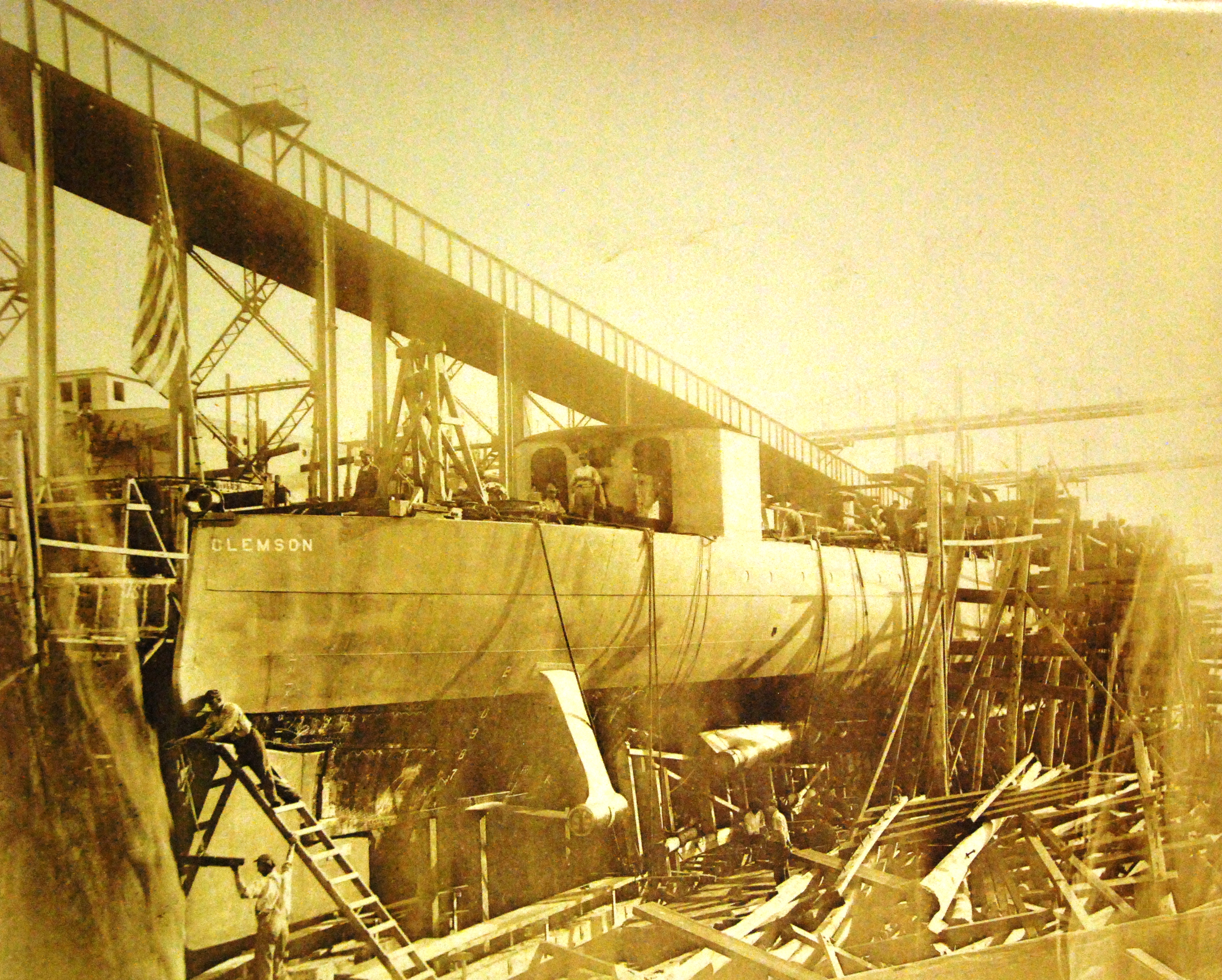
Launch of Clemson

Clemson was launched 5 September 1918 by Newport News Shipbuilding & Dry Dock Company, Newport News, Virginia; sponsored by Miss M. C. Daniels. The ship was commissioned on 29 December 1919.

== Service history ==
=== 1919–1922 ===
Clemson cruised in United States East Coast and Cuban waters until placed in reserve with 50% complement at Norfolk Navy Yard on 13 June 1920. She lay there and later at the Charleston Navy Yard and Boston Navy Yard until she steamed to the Philadelphia Navy Yard, where she was decommissioned 30 June 1922.

=== World War II ===
==== In the Atlantic ====
Reclassified AVP-17, 15 November 1939, and converted into a small aircraft tender, Clemson was recommissioned 12 July 1940. On 6 August, she was again reclassified, becoming AVD-4, and on 18 August reported to Commander, Aircraft, Scouting Force, Atlantic Fleet at Norfolk, Virginia. From 29 August 1940 to 28 November 1941 she tended patrol planes in the Caribbean and at the Galapagos Islands. Clemson then sailed south arriving at Recife, Brazil, 6 December. She remained on the coast of Brazil until 22 January 1942 when she returned to the Galapagos Islands. For the next year the tender shuttled between there and the Caribbean as her services was required. She returned to Norfolk, 2 March 1943 and then moved to Charleston, for reconversion to a destroyer (although not reclassified DD-186 until 1 December 1943).

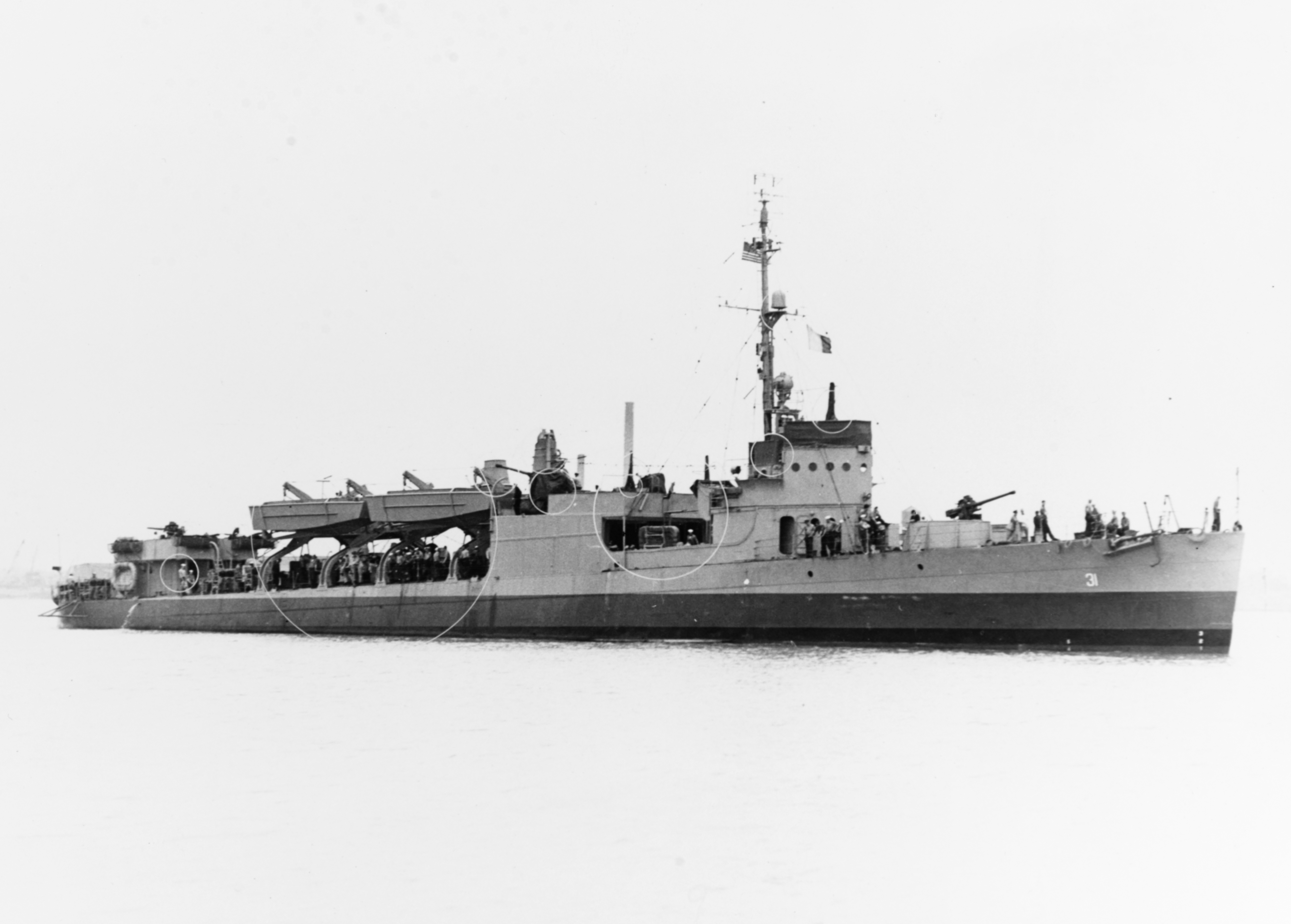
Clemson (APD-31) in Charleston Navy Yard, 21 April 1944. The circles mark recent alterations.

On 30 May 1943, she joined the pioneer American hunter-killer group built around Bogue. Clemson made eight patrols with the group during which it sank eight German submarines, a major contribution to victory in the Battle of the Atlantic. Clemson shared in the credit for the sinking of U-172 on 13 December at 26° 19' N., 29° 58' W. After an overhaul at New York early in 1944, she escorted a convoy to Casablanca and back between 25 January and 9 March. Once more, Clemson underwent conversion, this time to a high speed transport at Charleston Navy Yard (reclassified APD-31, 7 March 1944).

Clemson shared in the Presidential Unit Citation awarded the Bogue hunter-killer group.

==== In the Pacific ====
Clearing Charleston on 1 May 1944, the transport reached Pearl Harbor on 24 May and embarked Underwater Demolition Team 6 (UDT 6). She then sailed westward to act as a mother ship for UDT 6 as it prepared beaches immediately before the invasions of Saipan, Guam, Peleliu, Leyte and of Luzon. While entering Lingayen Gulf 5 January 1945, she drove off a Japanese air attack. Clemson escorted convoys to Ulithi, Saipan, and Okinawa before returning to San Pedro, Los Angeles, 6 July. Re-designated DD-186, 17 July, she was still undergoing reconversion when World War II ended. She was decommissioned 12 October 1945 and sold 21 November 1946. The ship's bell is privately owned in Clemson, South Carolina.

== Awards ==
Clemson received nine battle stars for World War II service.
