= Thomas I. Miller =

Tim Miller

President of Murray State University
- In office July 2013 – July 13, 2014
- Preceded by: Randy Dunn
- Succeeded by: Robert Davies

Interim President of Murray State University
- In office August 15, 2006 – November 30, 2006
- Preceded by: Kern Alexander (Interim)
- Succeeded by: Randy Dunn

Personal details
- Education: B.S., Murray State University; M.B.A., Murray State University; Ph.D., University of Arkansas
- Profession: Accountant, Professor

Thomas I. "Tim" Miller is an American academic administrator and accountant. He was the 12th president of Murray State University in Murray, Kentucky. He retired as president on July 13, 2014.

== Early life ==
Tim Miller graduated from Murray State University in 1966 with his bachelor's degree in accounting. As an undergraduate student, Miller was a member of Sigma Chi fraternity, and he was a charter member of Murray State's chapter of Alpha Kappa Psi professional business fraternity. He went on to earn his Master of Business Administration degree from Murray State in 1967. In 1973 he completed his doctorate in accounting at the University of Arkansas.

== Career ==
Miller began his teaching career as a graduate student in 1967. He eventually was promoted to chairman of the Accounting Department at Murray State, and he held that position for two different times: from 1977 to 1981, and 1985 to 1998. Miller also served as executive director of the Murray State Foundation from 1991 to 2010 as assets grew from 31 to 100 million dollars. He was named the Outstanding Teacher in the College of Business and Public Affairs in 1982, the Outstanding Teacher in the Department of Accounting in 1998–99, and the Regents Award winner for Teaching Excellence in the College of Business and Public Affairs in 2008. He was selected the university's "Distinguished Professor" by the MSU Alumni Association in 1991. In 2011, Miller was selected for the "Outstanding Alumnus Award" from the Department of Accounting at Murray State, and in 2018, was selected for the "Distinguished Alumnus Award" at Murray State by the Alumni Association. After his retirement from Murray State in 2014, the Accounting Department Office at MSU was named the "Dr. Tim Miller Center for Accounting Education" where he taught accounting classes for the majority of his 47-year tenure. He was also selected for the "Tradition of Excellence Alumni Award" from Elizabethtown High School in 2015, as well as induction into the Elizabethtown High School "Athletic Hall of Fame in 2016.

Outside of his higher education career, Miller has worked as either an owner or partner of a public accounting firm since 1978. He was a partner in the firm of Miller & Wilson CPAs from 1993 through 2010. He continued on as an employee with the firm after 2010. Miller has also served on a number of boards of directors, including the Murray Electric System, Heritage Bank, and Murray-Calloway County Hospital.

=== Murray State presidency ===
Tim Miller was appointed in 2006 to his first of two terms as interim president of Murray State University. He served in the position after the departure of F. King Alexander and prior to the arrival of Randy Dunn.

In June 2013, following the departure of Randy Dunn, the Murray State Board of Regents voted unanimously to once again name Tim Miller as the interim president of the university. In March 2014, the board voted to remove interim from Miller's title, naming him officially as the 12th president of Murray State University. Miller would continue to serve as president until his retirement in July 2014, when Robert Davies would assume the duties as the 13th president of Murray State. Miller was the first graduate of Murray State to ever be appointed to the position of president of the university.

== Personal life ==
Miller is married to the former Patsy Purdom of Murray. They have a son, Mark, and a daughter, Anne. They all graduated from Murray State University.
