= Robert Maxson =

American academic administrator (born 1936)

Robert C. Maxson

President of Sierra Nevada College
- In office 2007 – 2010
- Succeeded by: Richard Rubsamen

President of California State University, Long Beach
- In office 1994 – 2006
- Preceded by: Curtis McCray
- Succeeded by: F. King Alexander

President of University of Nevada, Las Vegas
- In office 1984 – 1994
- Preceded by: Leonard E. "Pat" Goodall
- Succeeded by: Kenny C. Guinn

President of University of Houston–Victoria
- In office 1978 – 1982
- Preceded by: Reginald Taylor
- Succeeded by: Martha K. Piper

Personal details
- Born: May 8, 1936 Watson, Arkansas
- Died: September 28, 2025 (aged 89) San Juan Island, Washington (state)
- Education: University of Arkansas at Monticello; Florida Atlantic University; Mississippi State University

Robert Clinton Maxson (May 8, 1936 – 2025) was an American academic administrator who has served as president of several institutions of higher education. He was most recently (2008–10) president of Sierra Nevada College, a private, liberal arts college in Incline Village, Nevada.

Much of his previous leadership work was in public, urban universities in the western United States. He was president of the University of Houston–Victoria from 1978 to 1982, president of the University of Nevada, Las Vegas from 1984 to 1994 and president of California State University, Long Beach, from June 1994 until January 2006. He was succeeded there by F. King Alexander. Maxson was ultimately president of Sierra Nevada College from 2007 to 2010, until he retired.

During Maxson's presidency at UNLV, he frequently clashed with popular men's basketball coach Jerry Tarkanian, who coached the team from 1973 to 1992. Tarkanian led the UNLV Runnin' Rebels to four Final Four appearances and in 1990, the team defeated Duke for the Division 1 championship. Tarkanian's program was dogged by NCAA investigations into improper recruiting and misconduct by his players. Tarkanian was forced to resign, his final season coaching UNLV was 1992. Tarkanian's supporters in Las Vegas were hostile to Maxson, according to the Los Angeles Times.

Ironically, Tarkanian was head basketball coach at Long Beach State from 1970 to 1973.

He has been named President of the Year four consecutive years by student leaders of the 23-campus California State University system; after the fourth year the award was permanently named after him. as well as Man of the Year by the National Conference for Community and Justice and by the American Jewish Committee.

California State University reported on Oct. 1, 2025 that Maxson died at the age of 89.
