= Lovett Auditorium =

Murray State University Historic Auditorium

Coordinates: 36°36′47″N 88°19′22″W

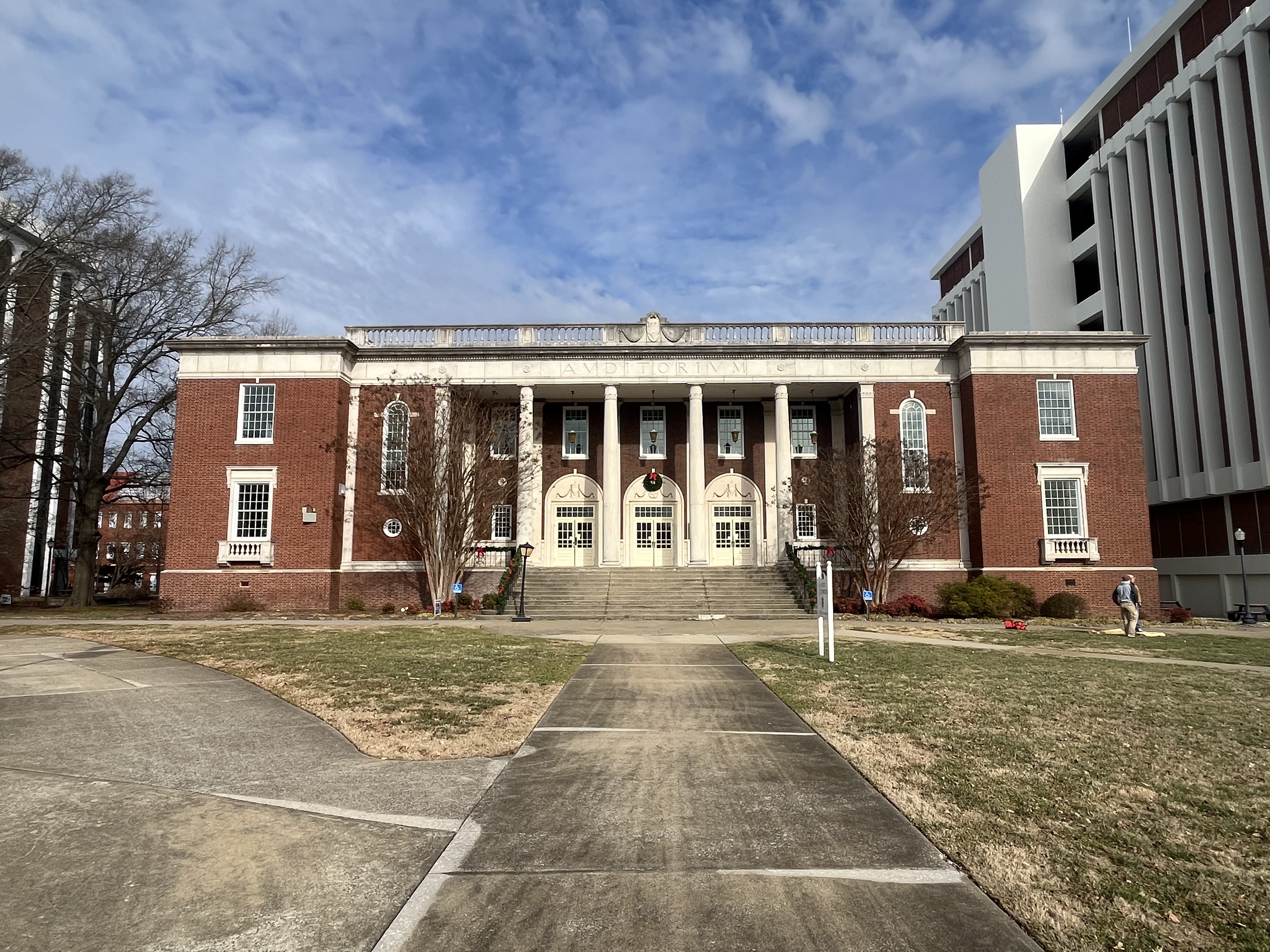
Lovett Auditorium as seen from the university quad. The inscription atop the colonnade reads "AVDITORIVM"

Lovett Auditorium is a performance venue on the Murray State University campus with a capacity of approximately 2,200. On the North side of the campus' quad, it is one of the original buildings on the school's campus. (The school's first auditorium, however, was in what is now the Wrather Museum of Western Kentucky.) Several on- and off-campus organizations currently use the space and several events have been held inside, including graduations, orientations, concerts, and even basketball games. The auditorium is administered and managed by Murray State's College of Humanities and Fine Arts and is the main performance venue for several of the Department of Music's ensembles.

== Namesake ==
Upon the completion of its construction in 1928, Lovett Auditorium was called the "College Auditorium". The building was renamed in 1973 in honor of Mrs. Laurine Wells Lovett, daughter of founder and second President of the Murray State Normal School, Rainey T. Wells. Mrs. Lovett was a member of the Murray State Board of Regents from 1924 to 1928 and was influential in the design of the auditorium.

== History ==
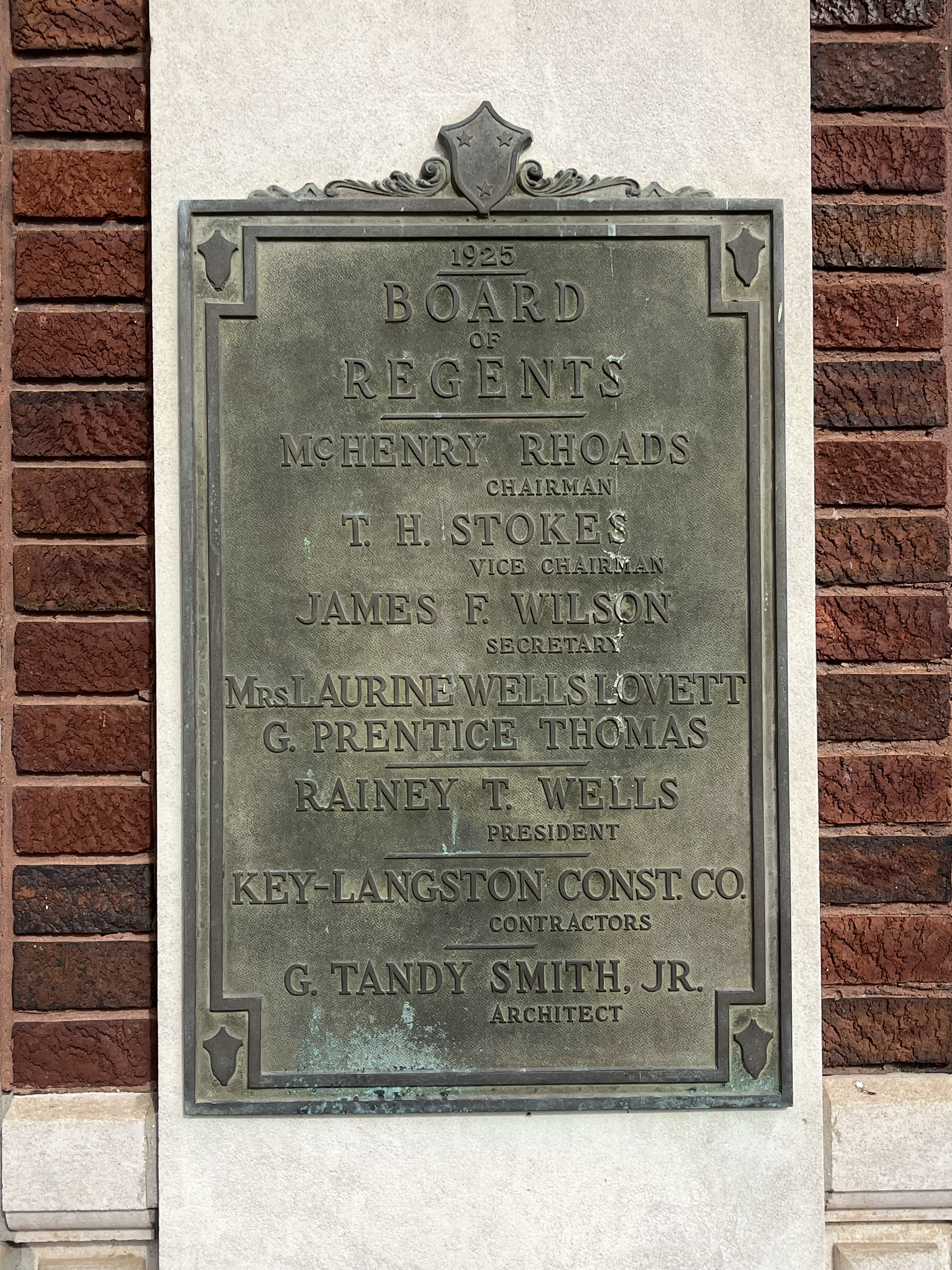
The auditorium's plaque listing those important to its construction.

=== Construction and early uses ===
On April 1, 1926, at a meeting of the Murray State Board of Regents, sitting president John W. Carr tendered his resignation. In this address, Carr made known his wish for the college to construct a "greater auditorium... one which will enable us to bring not only to the students, but to the people of Western Kentucky the best things in music, oratory, art, and religion". Also in 1926, the Kentucky State Legislature passed a bill directing $400,000 to be used to improve Murray State. These improvements, under the presidency of Rainey T. Wells, would eventually include the construction of the auditorium, training school, and central heating plant at an original estimated cost of $396,500. Designed by architect G. Tandy Smith Jr., the Key Langston Construction Company constructed the auditorium at a cost of $129,225.29. After the installation of plumbing and electrical infrastructure, the final cost of the building was $145,462.34. Upon the completion of the building in 1928, it was the largest college auditorium in Kentucky. Anecdotally, the auditorium was seen as a symbol of Kentucky's commitment to higher education, as noted by a visit to the college by Georgia congressman W. D. Upshaw. Upshaw is quoted in the school's newspaper:

"When I get back to Atlanta, I am going to shame the people of the city in their refusal to build an adequate auditorium for Georgia Tech, and I shall point to Murray State Teachers College's new auditorium to show what Kentucky is doing for her schools."

There was no dedication or grand opening ceremony for the auditorium, and Murray State immediately began using it in January 1928 for several events and activities such as graduation ceremonies and basketball games, which were held there for several years until the construction of the Health Building in 1937.

Basketball was a key factor in the design of the building, as the stage was planned to be 90 feet long and 50 feet wide for the basketball teams to practice and host games. Both the men and women's basketball teams played on the auditorium stage from 1928 to 1937. The auditorium was also used to host play-by-play "phonecasts" of Murray State away games, particularly in championship games.

Four standard classrooms and several offices on the second floor behind the audience balcony were included for the school's music department. The offices, which are now unused, provided workspaces for the department faculty and spaces to hold private music lessons. In 1938, the on-campus student-run organization Campus Lights produced its first show. Campus Lights has held music events, prominently musical theater productions, annually in the auditorium ever since.

=== Renovations ===
1945 - Murray State completed construction of the first fine arts building, which was joined with Lovett Auditorium to give students and faculty of the music department easy access to the facility.

1960s - The auditorium was updated with a sprinkler system and air conditioning. The audience seats were also reupholstered and repainted.

1994 - The original 1928 stage was removed and replaced. During construction some pieces of the old stage were taken as souvenirs by on-campus organizations that regularly used the space.

2010s - Lovett Auditorium underwent roof replacement, repainting, electrical updates, and the addition of an accessible men and women's restroom at a cost of $215,000. The original restrooms are only accessible by stairs.

2020 - A major renovation began with an original expected cost of $4.52 million. This included all-new seating on the first floor, HVAC upgrades, new windows, and new stage curtains. Although all of the seating on the first floor was replaced, the balcony's seating remains original as it is much less worn and rarely used. This renovation was completed in 2022.

2026 - The main entrance of the auditorium was upgraded with new doors.

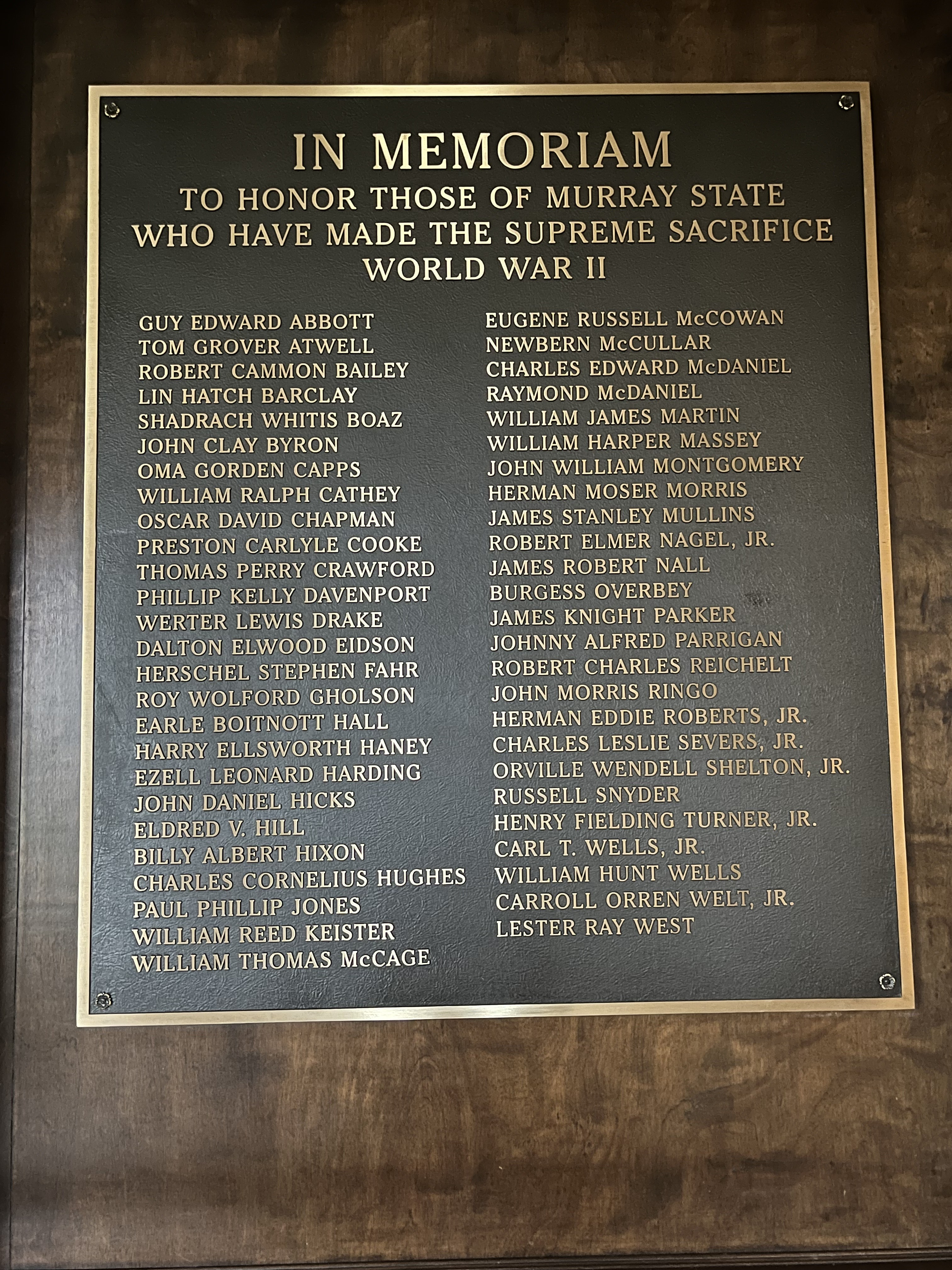
A plaque in the auditorium's lobby, listing each student of Murray State College who was killed in action during the Second World War.

=== Present day ===
Up to today, several music ensembles rehearse and perform in the auditorium, with recording and sound equipment at the top of the audience balcony installed after construction. The university still uses the auditorium annually to host prospective and incoming students for orientations before the start of each Fall semester.

A plaque hangs in the lobby of the auditorium honoring "Those of Murray State Who Have Made the Supreme Sacrifice, World War II". It lists, in chronological order of their deaths, the names of former Murray State students who were killed in action during the Second World War.

== Notable performers and speakers ==
- Wednesday, 16 September 2009 - Justin Townes Earle
- Saturday, 21 November 2009 - Old Crow Medicine Show
- Saturday, 20 August 2011 - Jason Isbell and the 400 Unit
- Monday, February 4 2013 - Spike Lee
