= Waterfield Library =

Primary library of Murray State University, Kentucky, United States

Harry Lee Waterfield Library
- 36.6135°N 88.3215°W
- Location: Waterfield Library, Murray, KY 42071, United States
- Type: Public
- Established: September 2nd, 1978

Other information
- Website: lib.murraystate.edu

Waterfield Library is the primary library of Murray State University, Kentucky, United States. It is named for Harry Lee Waterfield, and is a library for students as well as the local community. Originally the student center at Murray State it became the library years later.

== History ==
Originally built in 1959 for nearly one million dollars, Waterfield Library was first known as the Waterfield Student Union Building. It was named after Harry Lee Waterfield, a graduate of Murray State University and a Lieutenant Governor of Kentucky.

As a student center: it had included a post office, a cafeteria, a ballroom, a bookstore, offices and recreation rooms. In the early to mid-1970s, the university was faced with a growing demand for a new library, as the old one had been outgrown by both collection size and student population. It was decided that the Waterfield Student Union Building would be renovated to fulfill this need. Three million dollars was secured for the conversion, which consisted of a three-story addition to the front of the building as well as several internal renovations. The groundbreaking ceremony was held on the 22nd of November, 1976, with the library opening to the public shortly afterwards.

It was determined that even with the renovations, the new library would not be big enough to hold the entire university collection, so the main library (now Pogue Library), was designated to be the building for special collections, legal collection, and archives. The library's dedication ceremony was held on the 2nd of September, 1978.

The library's basement was renovated in 2006 to replace the aging electrical systems and install retractable bookshelves Several years later the third floor was remodeled to act as a quiet study area featuring ample seating, phone and computer chargers, and private study rooms. The renovations were completed in 2014. Since the third floor had previously been used to house books and journals, library staff and faculty had to sort through these pieces and ensure important works were available on digital databases before clearing out the physical copies. The most recent renovations occurred in 2015. The library's remaining electrical systems were modernized and the main floor restrooms were made compliant with the Americans with Disabilities Act.

== Introducing technology ==
Over time the library has been renovated to accommodate changing trends in technology and the evolving concept of a modern facility. During the fall of 1982, a computer center was opened in what had been Waterfield Library's smoking lounge. It contained twelve terminals, two printers, and was free for use by students and faculty. Since then, Waterfield Library has expanded its computing area to include 60 desktop computers and offers 50 laptops for students to utilize. In 1992, the library changed its circulation process to an electronic system, which allowed students to use the public terminals to search for books and add themselves to electronic waiting lists.

== Current collection size (2015) ==
- 392,820 physical books
- 153,685 books available electronically
- 203,544 microforms
- 34,020 "media" pieces (DVDs, VHS tapes, etc.)
- 110,173 digital archive objects
- Subscribed to 256 print journals
- Subscribed to 729 electronic journals
- Subscribed to 176 databases

== Library services ==
Waterfield Library offers a variety of services designed to help students with collecting and using information for their schoolwork.

During the fall 2014 and spring 2015 semesters:

- 7,351 specific information questions were answered by librarians
- over 1.5 million database searches were performed
- nearly 7,914 students were taught how to correctly cite and utilize sources through 379 instruction sessions

== Additional services ==
=== The Racer Writing Center ===
Students can make 40-minute appointments to work one-on-one with consultants at any stage in the writing process. The Writing Center can be used free of charge by undergraduates, graduates, and faculty.

=== The Racer Oral Communication Center ===
By appointment, students can practice giving presentations and receive feedback from student tutors. Like the Writing Center, this service is offered free of charge.

== Minor in Information Studies ==
Waterfield Library is a part of the University Libraries system at Murray State University. In addition to offering regular information literacy instruction sessions to classes on campus, it is the home of a minor in Information Studies. "The minor is intended to complement and major…[it] discuss[es] libraries, the Internet, and how people get information." Major topics in the minor include "net neutrality, information as a human right, propaganda, and censorship...what it means to create information and the protections the creator has in copyright and licensing."
