= Ruth H. Alexander =

American activist (1938–2021)

- Born: Wanda Ruth Hammack; April 17, 1938; Madison County, Kentucky, U.S.
- Died: April 20, 2021 (aged 83); Gainesville, Florida, U.S.
- Education: Milligan College; University of Kentucky
- Known for: Distinguished professor of physical education Lady Gators program Founding member of the Florida Governor’s Council on Physical Fitness and Sport
- Spouse: Kern Alexander (m. 1961, divorced)
- Children: 4, including F. King Alexander
- Awards: President's Council on Sports, Fitness & Nutrition Lifetime Achievement Award (2013)
- Honors: Florida Women's Hall of Fame; National Association of Sport and Physical Education’s Hall of Fame (1987); Milligan College Athletics Hall of Fame (1998)

Ruth Hammack Alexander (April 17, 1938 – April 20, 2021) was an American activist for women in collegiate sports. She established the "Lady Gator Athletic" program at the University of Florida to allow women to participate in intercollegiate athletics for the first time.

Alexander earned her master's degree and a doctorate before joining the faculty of the University of Florida where she earned the title of Distinguished Professor in the Department of Exercise and Sport Sciences. From there, she spearheaded a campaign to allow equal opportunities for female athletes to compete at the University of Florida in the National Collegiate Athletic Association. President Richard Nixon appointed her to sit on the President's Council on Sports, Fitness, and Nutrition and she founded the Florida Governor's Council on Physical Fitness and Sports.

She was inducted into the National Association of Sport and Physical Education's Hall of Fame in 1987 and the Milligan College Athletics Hall of Fame in 1998. In 2004, she was inducted into the Florida Sports Hall of Fame. In 2012, Alexander was inducted into the Florida Women's Hall of Fame.

== Personal life ==
Alexander was born on April 17, 1938 in Madison County, Kentucky, with an older sister Jacqueline and two older brothers, Larry and Denny. They were all raised as Methodists. Although her mother died when she was young, Alexander says both of her parents inspired her to become involved in sports.

Alexander and her former husband Kern Alexander had four children together. Her son F. King Alexander was the president of Louisiana State University.

== Career ==
After graduating from Milligan College in 1960 with a degree in religious education and physical education, Alexander earned a master's degree at the University of Kentucky. She married in 1961 and moved to Bowling Green, Kentucky, where she worked at the State Street Methodist Church. After her first son was born, the family moved to Louisville, Kentucky where she worked at Valley High School and earned her doctorate. She then taught at Indiana University, the University of Kentucky, and the University of Maryland before joining the University of Florida faculty. Alexander stated that she earned her job as an assistant professor at the University of Maryland because of her degree in educational psychology. As an assistant professor, she also taught nursing courses at the Walter Reed Hospital School of Nursing. Alexander eventually left the University of Maryland because her husband wanted to move and gained employment at the University of Florida. She eventually earned the title of Distinguished Professor in the Department of Exercise and Sport Sciences at the University of Florida and was named Chairman of the Department of Physical Education for Women.

After receiving encouragement from several female teachers, Alexander and other female coaches approached Florida University athletic director Ray Graves with a request to fund women's sports. They then brought their proposal to the Faculty Committee on Intercollegiate Athletics who approved their budgeting plan. This marked the first time a Southeastern Conference school would fund women's sports. Starting in 1972, the women's intercollegiate athletic programs at the University of Florida (dubbed the “Lady Gator Athletic” program) received a budget of $16,000 to start golf, tennis, swimming, track and gymnastics teams. After they proved to be successful, the following year they received $36,000. During the 1973–1974 season, every female team finished within the top of their respective sport in the National Collegiate Athletic Association. The University of Florida female golf team finished fifth, the swimming team was eighth, and the tennis team ranked 10th. After that season, the budget was raised to $65,000. Alexander stated that while there was backlash from some male coaches who did not like sharing their budget and facilities with women teams, others were supportive and offered to coach.

Alexander was not only active in female participation and equality in athletics at the University of Florida. She was also recruited to testify in front of the United States Congress about the importance of funding for female sports to help push Title IX. Title IX was a proposed federal civil rights law that stated no person should be excluded on the basis of sex. Even before the implementation of Title IX, Alexander served as the coordinator of the Association for Intercollegiate Athletics for Women until 1981. Although she continued her job as a professor, she eventually decided to concentrate on fitness. President Richard Nixon took notice of her work and appointed Alexander to the President's Council on Sports, Fitness, and Nutrition, making her the first woman ever to be appointed to the council; she was subsequently reappointed by the three following presidents.

Alexander was a founding member of the Florida Governor's Council on Physical Fitness and Sports and served as its governor four times. She was inducted into the National Association of Sport and Physical Education's Hall of Fame in 1987 and into the Milligan College Athletics Hall of Fame in 1998. She retired from the University of Florida in June 2004 and was inducted into the Florida Women's Hall of Fame in 2012. Alexander died on April 20, 2021, at the age of 83 in Gainesville, Florida.

== Publications ==
List of publications:

- Teachers and torts liability for pupil injury (with Kern Alexander) (1970)
- Physical education activities handbook for men and women (with Dennis K. Stanley) (1973)
- Physical education concepts: a teaching-learning guide (1977)
- Focus on fitness (1987)
- Comparability Funding in Athletic Programs: The Florida Approach in Journal of Education Finance (1983)
- Lady Gators-- : simply the best (with Paula D. Wesch) (1991)

== Awards and honors ==
- President's Council on Sports, Fitness & Nutrition (PCSFN) Lifetime Achievement Award (2013)
- Florida governor's Leadership Award
