= Oxford Round Table =

Organizations based in California

The Oxford Round Table, or Oxford Symposia, is a family-run business located in the United States.

== History of the Family Business ==
The first meeting of Oxford Round Table was developed under the direction of Kern Alexander in 1989.

For most of its history the Oxford Round Table has been an American organisation run by members of the Alexander family and variously headquartered in Kentucky, Illinois, Florida, and California. Kern Alexander, Professor of Excellence at the University of Illinois, Urbana-Champaign, founded the Oxford International Round Table on Education Policy in 1989. However, it was not incorporated until 1994, when it was established in Florida as a for-profit corporation, with Alexander as president. It was administratively dissolved in 1996. Alexander also incorporated the Oxford Round Table, Inc., a Florida for-profit corporation; it was established and dissolved at the same time as the Oxford International Round Table on Education Policy.

In 1995, the Oxford Round Table, Inc., a for-profit Kentucky corporation, was incorporated by Samual K. Alexander III (son of Kern Alexander). It was administratively dissolved in 1998 and reinstated in 2006. This corporation dissolved itself 22 September 2008.

In 1998, the Oxford Round Table, Inc., a for-profit corporation, was incorporated in Illinois by F. King Alexander, (son of Kern Alexander). It was involuntarily dissolved in 2000.

In December 2001, the non-profit Oxford Round Table of Godstow Hall, Inc., was incorporated in Kentucky by several members of the Alexander family. In May 2007, the non-profit Oxford Round Table, Inc., NFP, was established in Illinois. It changed its name to Oxford Round Table, North America, Inc., NFP, in October 2008. In July 2008, the non-profit Oxford Round Table, Ltd., was established in the United Kingdom., went dormant a year later and was "struck off the books" the following year.

In the 2007 annual report of the Kentucky for-profit Oxford Round Table, Inc., Kern Alexander was listed as company president. As of the 2008 annual report, J.C. Buckman was listed as president.

In 2007 the University of Oxford, stated that events such as the Oxford Round Table are "external to the university" and "not, as such, authorised or endorsed by the university." The company was accused of misrepresenting its relationship with the university. In response, the company brought a defamation action against an academic lecturer affiliated with Oxford University. The suit was dismissed.

In 2008, it filed for a non-profit charter in the United Kingdom. It was dissolved in 2011.

As of October 2026 the staff page for the Oxford Round Table and Oxford Symposia lists F. King Alexander and his wife, Shenette Alexander as Director. Shenette is also listed as the Associate Editor of the Journal of Academic Perspectives, which is associated with the Oxford Symposia. The "About Us" page states:

The Oxford Symposia is one of these independent conferences, hosted at colleges recommended by Conference Oxford. While the events take place at Oxford colleges, the Symposia are not official University of Oxford academic programs. Instead, Oxford Symposia is an independent, nonprofit organization that operates separately from the University and its colleges.

== Conferences ==
The first meeting of the Oxford Round Table was held at St. Peter's College (Oxford) in 1989, sponsored by the Norham Centre for Leadership Studies of the University of Oxford under the direction of Vivian Williams and by Virginia Tech, under the direction of Kern Alexander. Subsequent Oxford Round Table conferences have been held at Harris Manchester College, Trinity College, Exeter College, Oriel College, Lincoln College, and the Oxford Union.

The Oxford Round Table brings together scholars and others from a variety of backgrounds (new professors and PhD students, college presidents and deans, school administrators, religious leaders) to discuss research on specific topics usually related to public policy. In its early years, the conference was held every other year, and the organisation financed the attendance of participants by raising funds itself (more than £80,000 in 1993). By 2009, the ORT was charging attendees.

One of the earliest conferences, in 1993, was on the links between education and the business sector. It brought together education ministers from major developing and transition countries, representatives of major multinationals (such as Apple, Boeing, BP, and Honeywell), US state officials, and the World Bank. A major highlight was a paper by Edward Dneprov, education minister of Russia, on education reform there. A 1993 article in the Times Higher Education Supplement noted that "the Oxford conferences are going very well" and had gained "international interest."

== Criticism and litigation ==
A 2009 report cited critics who claimed that the Oxford Round Table "does not make its lack of academic connection [to Oxford University] clear." The article noted that pictures of Oxford University are used liberally on the ORT webpage, and quoted a number of ORT attendees who believed they had been invited by Oxford University. One professor expressed "surprise" when she learned that the ORT was not affiliated with Oxford University and concluded that "my conference funds would be best targeted towards a more appropriate venue."

In 2007, Times Higher Education reported that Oxford Round Table had been criticised on the forums of the Chronicle of Higher Education website by people who said it was trading on the name of Oxford University, and failed to properly inform people invited that it had no formal academic links to the university. Other criticisms were that its selection criteria were poor and that it was a "vanity conference."

The University told the newspaper that such external events were "not, as such, authorised or endorsed by the university." The principal of Harris Manchester College said that although the college provided the company with an office, "we don't run the ORT in any sense," and that as far as he was aware, all ORT participants were satisfied. The company defended its selection criteria, and reported that its disclaimer, which is on its website, uses "the exact wording that was provided to us by the legal office of the University of Oxford several years ago." A spokeswoman dismissed the critics as "a few nameless bloggers."

The ORT sued Sloan Mahone, a lecturer in the history of medicine at Oxford, after she emailed invitees and posted on the Chronicle of Higher Education website. The ORT complained that Mahone had described the ORT as a "scam", a "complete fraud", and "a tourist venture, not a prestigious academic event". An attempt by the Oxford Round Table, Inc., to sue Mahone for libel in the Kentucky courts failed on jurisdiction grounds, and the company threatened to take legal action in the UK. The company dropped the action after the researcher hired her own lawyer.
