= Murray State University =

Public university in Murray, Kentucky, US

- Former names: Murray State Normal School (1922–1926); Murray State Normal School and Teachers College (1926–1930); Murray State Teachers College (1930–1948); Murray State College (1948–1966)
- Type: Public university
- Established: 1922; 104 years ago
- Academic affiliations: Space-grant
- Endowment: $135 million (2025)
- President: Ron Patterson
- Provost: Paul Twigg
- Students: 9,932 (fall 2025)
- Undergraduates: 8,217 (fall 2025)
- Postgraduates: 1,715 (fall 2025)
- Location: Murray, Kentucky, United States; 36°36′56″N 88°19′17″W
- Campus: Suburban, 258.43 acres (main campus)
- Colors: Navy blue and gold
- Nickname: Racers
- Sporting affiliations: NCAA Division I – MVC
- Mascots: Racer One (live mascot); Dunker (costumed)
- Website: www.murraystate.edu

Murray State University (MSU) is a public university in Murray, Kentucky, United States. In addition to the main campus in Calloway County in southwestern Kentucky, Murray State operates extended campuses offering upper-level and graduate courses in Paducah, Hopkinsville, Madisonville, and Henderson.

== History ==
Murray State University was founded after the passage of Senate Bill 14 by the General Assembly of the Commonwealth of Kentucky, which created two normal schools in the early 20th century to address the growing demand for professional teachers. One was to be located in the western part of the state, and many cities and towns bid for the new normal school. Rainey T. Wells spoke on behalf of the city of Murray to convince the Normal School Commission to choose his city. On September 2, 1922, Murray was chosen as the site of the western normal school, while Morehead was chosen for the eastern normal school. On November 26, 1922, John Wesley Carr was elected the first president of the Murray State Normal School by the State Board of Education. Believing it had the authority to elect the president, the Normal School Commission picked Rainey Wells as the first president. On May 15, 1923, the Kentucky Court of Appeals ruled for the State Board of Education, and Carr became Murray's first president.

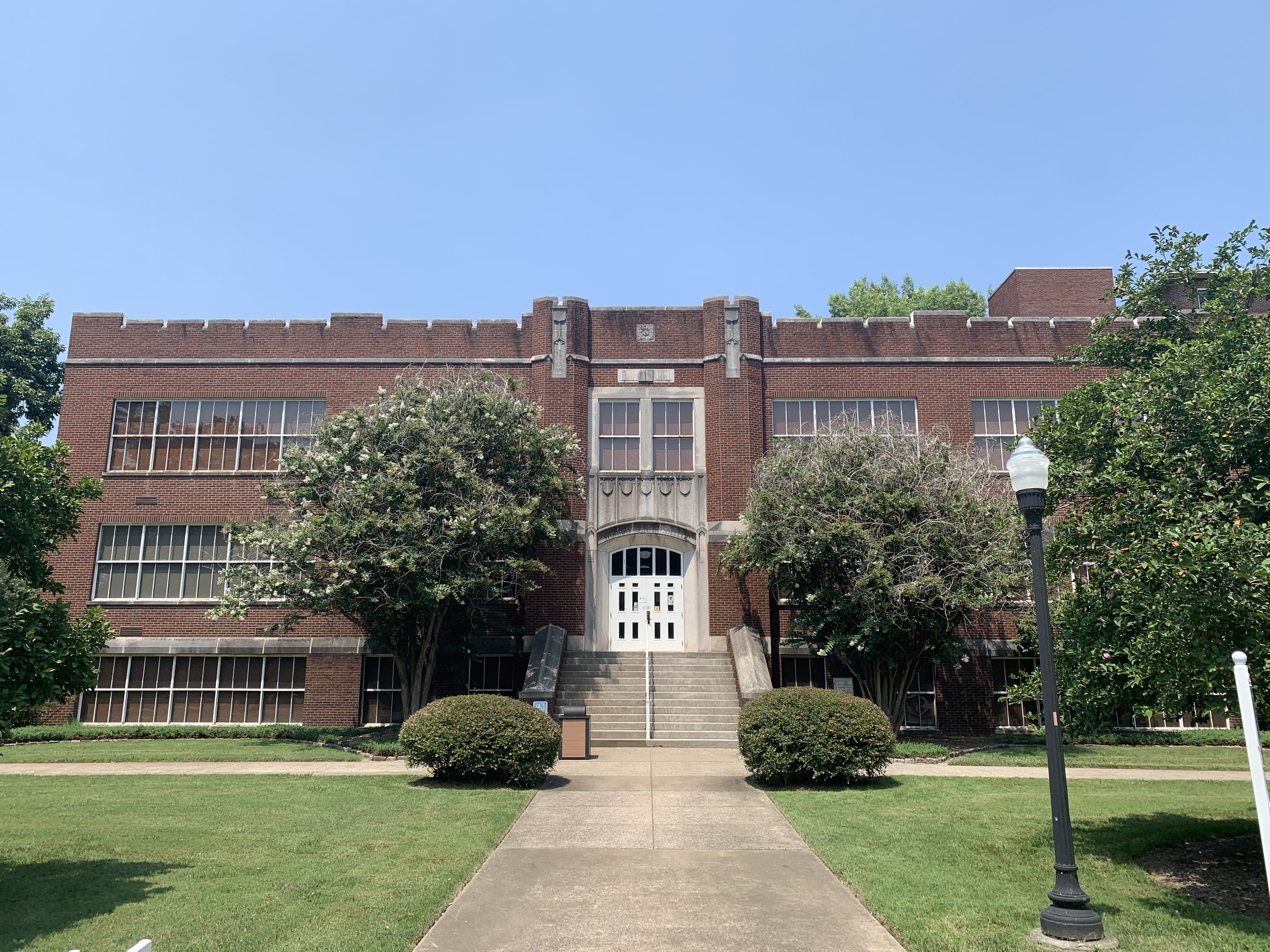
Wrather West Kentucky Museum, the first building on MSU's campus

Murray State Normal School opened on September 24, 1923. In 1924, the first building on Murray State's campus, the Administrative Building, was constructed. Before this, all MSU classes had been held on the first floor of what is now Murray Middle School, located on Main Street. Designed by Joseph & Joseph in the Collegiate Gothic style the Administrative Building, later known as Wrather Hall, housed classrooms, a dining hall, offices, and a chapel. The building was added to the National Register of Historic Places in 1975, and renovated soon after, finally being renamed to Wrather West Kentucky Museum, named for Murray State executive vice-president Marvin O. Wrather. All students lived at home or boarded with local families until the first dormitory, Wells Hall, was constructed in 1925. Wilson Hall was also completed under Carr's presidency, with other structures in progress.

In 1926, Rainey T. Wells, recognized as the founder of Murray State, became its second president. Wells served from 1926 to 1932, and during this time Lovett Auditorium, Carr Health Building, and Pogue Library were all completed. In 1926, the Normal School was renamed Murray State Normal School and Teachers College, with a four-year curriculum, and the General Assembly granted it authority to confer baccalaureate degrees. In 1928, the college was accredited by the Southern Association of Colleges and Schools. In 1930, the name was changed to Murray State Teachers College and it was granted authority to offer liberal arts and pre-professional courses. The name was changed again in 1948 to Murray State College, with the expansion of the programs to include graduate-level courses, in 1966 the General Assembly authorized the Board of Regents to change the name to Murray State University.

== Shield ==
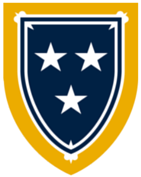
Murray State University shield

The school's shield has the heraldic coat of arms of the family of William Murray, Earl of Mansfield, and Lord Chief Justice of Great Britain in 1756. William Murray is an ancestor of the Murray family from whom the city and the university take their names. The shield is blue with a double gold border. Its three stars represent hope, endeavor, and achievement.

== Campus ==
=== Quad ===
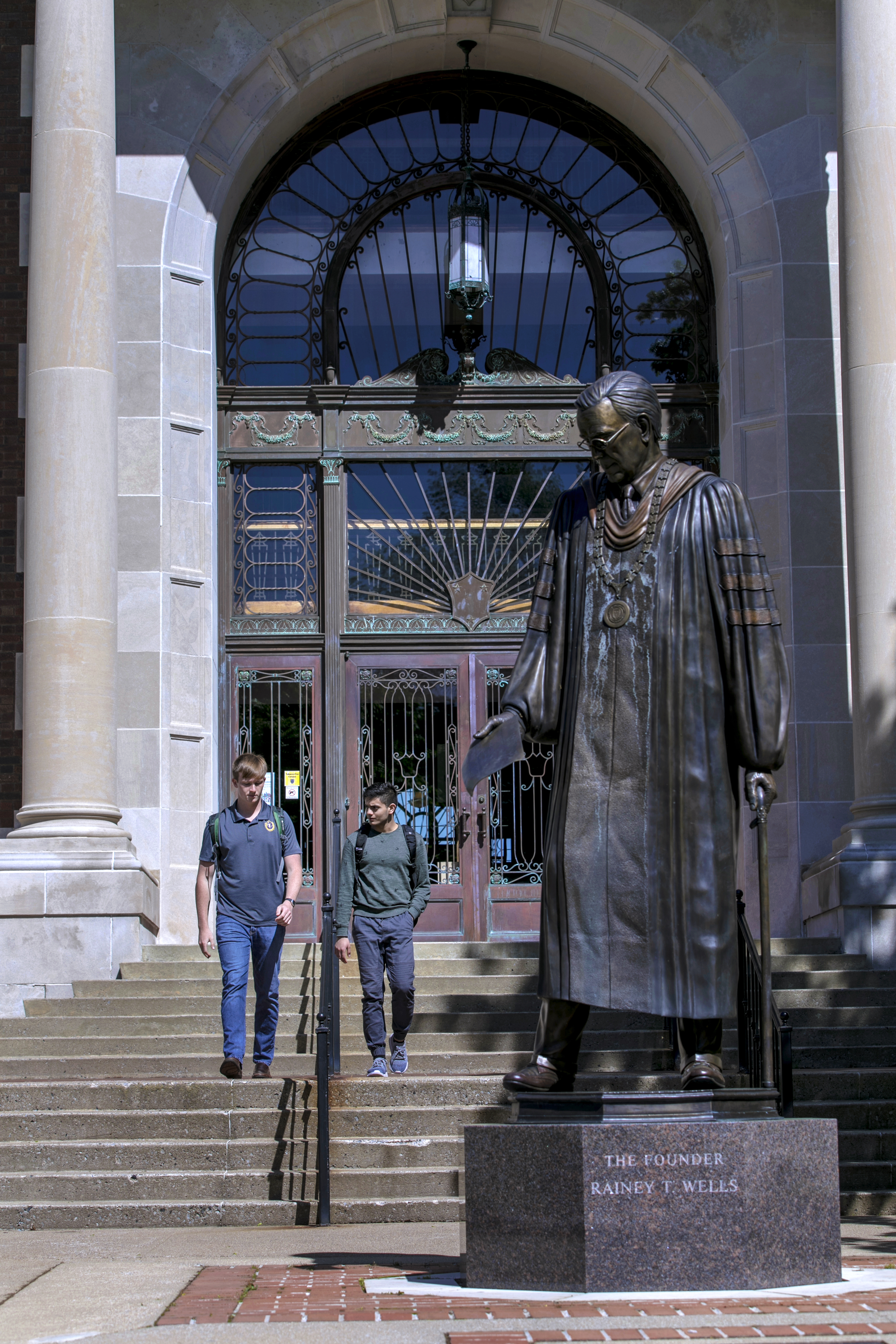
Two students walk out of Pogue Library near the statue of founder Rainey T. Wells.

The oldest and most easily recognizable buildings on the Murray State campus are situated around a large, grassy, tree-lined area on the south side of the campus. This part of the campus, known as the Quad, is bounded by 16th Street to the west, 15th Street to the east, Lovett Auditorium to the north, and Wilson Hall to the south.

In the southwest corner of the Quad is the oldest building on campus, now known as Wrather West Kentucky Museum. It was first known as the Administration Building and then as Wrather Hall, and housed classrooms and offices, before it became a museum. Ground for Wrather was broken on October 15, 1923, and it has been in use since 1924. The building was placed on the National Register of Historic Places in 1975, and features a large auditorium that is frequently used for lectures and meetings.

Faculty Hall, Wells Hall, and the Arthur J. Bauernfeind Business Building line the western edge of the Quad. The Lowry Center, Pogue Library, and the Price Doyle Fine Arts Center line the eastern side of the Quad. The 11-story Doyle Fine Arts Center is the tallest building on campus, housing numerous classrooms, practice rooms, recital halls, the Robert E. Johnson Theatre, Clara Eagle Art Gallery, WKMS-FM, and television studios used for student work.

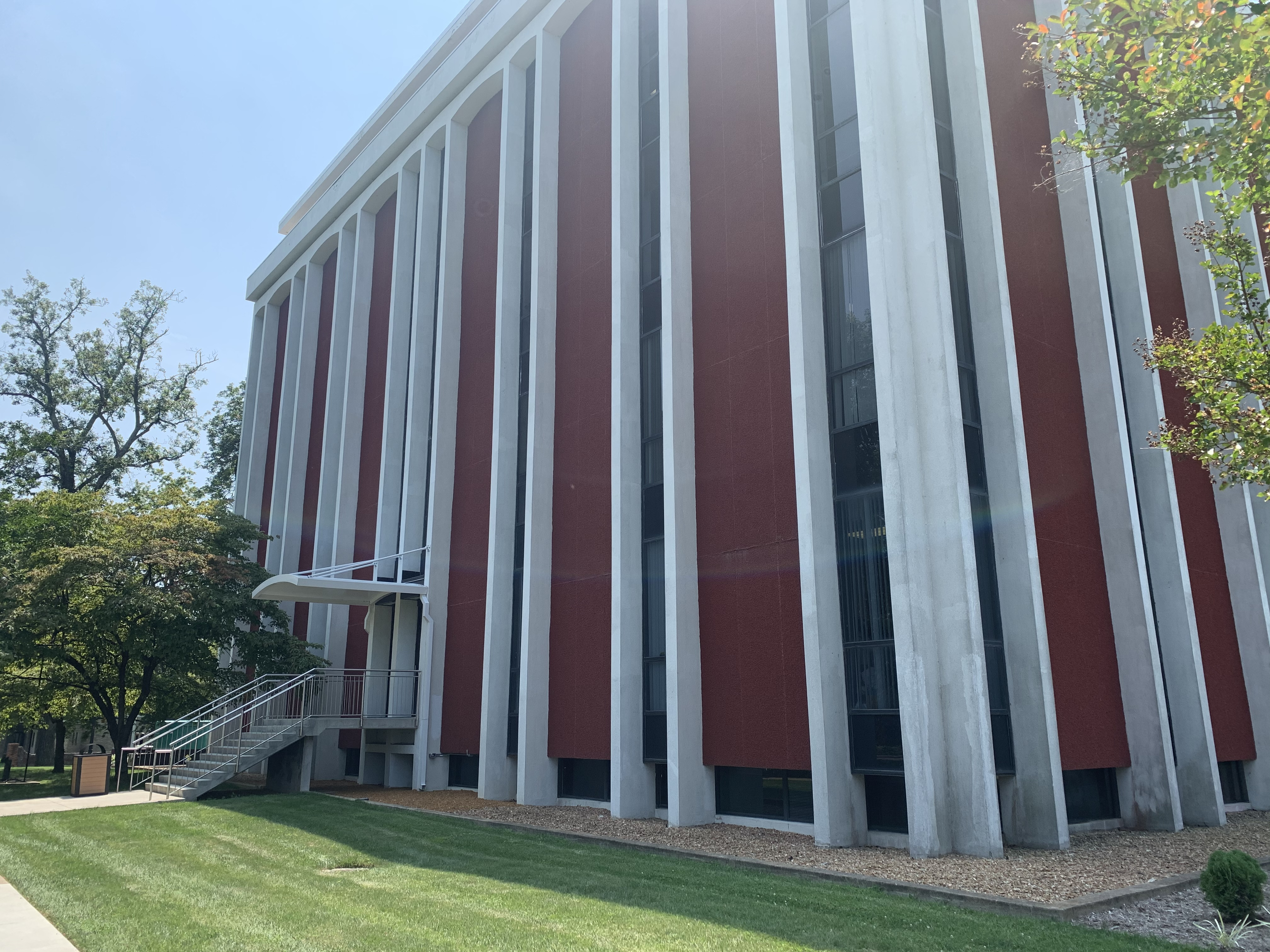
Sparks Hall

Directly south of the Quad is Sparks Hall. The five-story, 39,000-square-foot (3,600 m2), Sparks Hall was completed in 1967 for $1,308,514, and functions as the main administrative building, housing the offices of student financial aid, registration, accounting and financial services, human resources and branding, marketing and communication.

To the south of the Quadrangle, and directly west of Sparks Hall is Oakhurst, the residence of the university president. Construction of the mansion, originally known as Edgewood, began in 1917 and was completed in 1918. The home was built by Rainey T. Wells and his wife. The board of regents purchased the home from Wells in June 1936. It was remodeled that year and renamed Oakhurst in preparation for James H. Richmond's occupation of the house.

=== Central campus ===
The central portion of the Murray State campus lines 15th Street between Chestnut Street and Olive Boulevard. This portion of 15th Street was originally open to automobile traffic but has since been closed and converted into a pedestrian thoroughfare. Along the west side of the pedestrian pathway are the Martha Layne Collins Center for Industry and Technology, Blackburn Science Building, and Oakley Applied Science Building. To the east of the pedestrian pathway lies the Curris Center, Carr Health Building and Cutchin Fieldhouse, Waterfield Library, Mason Hall, and the front facade of the now-demolished Ordway Hall. Woods Hall, a former dormitory located behind Waterfield Library, was razed in the summer of 2019, and the space it occupied has been replaced with a park.

Ordway Hall was the most historic building in the central portion of campus. It was completed in 1931. Originally used as a men's dormitory, 38,600-square-foot Ordway Hall later housed event space and several offices. Because of costly renovation needs, Ordway was razed in 2013. The front facade was retained as a monument to its significance.

=== 16th Street, science campus ===
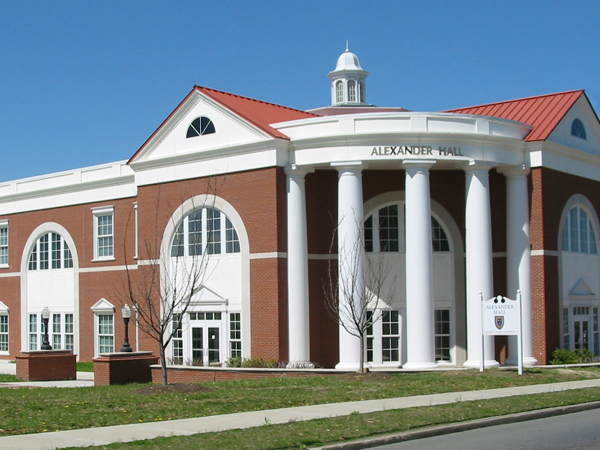
Alexander Hall, named for former Murray State President Kern Alexander

An aggressive building campaign over the years on campus has resulted in a westward expansion of the main academic campus of Murray State. The expansion began with a massive renovation and expansion of what is now known as Alexander Hall on the west side of 16th Street near Calloway Avenue. The project was the first to unveil a new architectural style that would become consistent through all renovation and new construction projects on campus. Alexander Hall houses classrooms and offices for the College of Education and Human Services. Construction continued with the new state-of-the-art science complex for biology and chemistry that is located just to the southwest of Alexander Hall. The massive new science complex was constructed in phases, with the Biology Building (Logan Hall) opening in 2004, and the rest of the complex and centerpiece clock tower reaching completion in March 2008. The new clock tower was dedicated in 2007 as the Jesse L. Jones Family Clock Tower. A physics and engineering building was completed in the summer of 2017. Jackson Hall, which will house the College of Nursing and Health Sciences, is scheduled to open in the fall of 2026.

=== Sports and recreation facilities ===
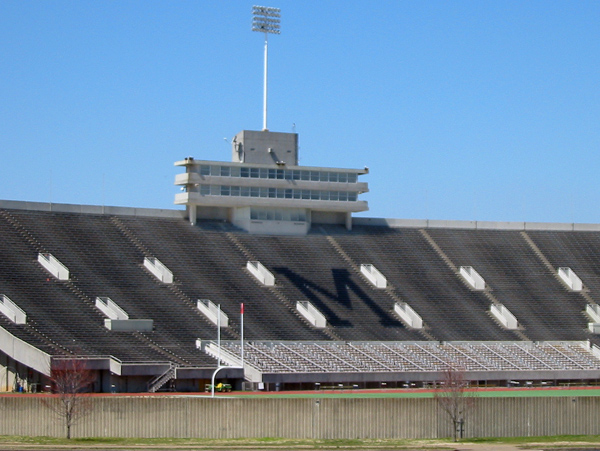
Roy Stewart Stadium

The majority of the university's sports and recreation facilities are located on the northernmost edge of the campus, along the KY-121 Bypass. The most prominent structure in the sports complex is Roy Stewart Stadium. The stadium, the home field to the Murray State Racers football program, was completed in 1973 and named for former Murray State football coach Roy Stewart. It seats 16,800. The outdated AstroTurf surface was replaced with FieldTurf in 2007. Located on the second floor of the seven-story press box and seating structure is the Pat Spurgin Rifle Range, home of the three-time NCAA champion rifle squad. The 8,602-seat CFSB Center was completed in 1998 to replace the aging Racer Arena, which had been outgrown by the men's and women's basketball teams. Racer Arena remains in use by the women's volleyball team.

On April 16, 2005, the new Susan E. Bauernfeind Student Recreation and Wellness Center was dedicated. The 73,000-square-foot (6,800 m^{2}) student recreation center includes a swimming pool, two racquetball courts, a walking/jogging track, an aerobic studio, basketball courts, and free weights and cardio workout machines. The center is located just north of the residential colleges, near Roy Stewart Stadium.

=== Residence halls ===
A building campaign is underway to replace many of the older residence halls. A replacement building for Clark College was completed and ready for residents at the beginning of the 2007 fall semester. Clark Hall was the newest building, and the first residence hall specifically designed around the residential college concept and model. A new four-story, 270-bed, 79,900-square foot Richmond Hall was opened for James H. Richmond Residential College in fall 2009. It has a similar concept and design as Clark College. In the fall of 2009, the old Clark Hall building was torn down.

Following the completion of the spring 2011 semester, the university began renovation to Elizabeth Hall, which houses the Elizabeth Residential College. The $7.2 million renovation project closed the building for the entire 2011–12 academic year as the highrise was upgraded to meet Americans with Disabilities Act (ADA) standards. The renovation also included new heating, ventilation, and air-conditioning systems to achieve Leadership in Energy and Environmental Design (LEED) silver status. The renovated Elizabeth Hall reopened on August 18, 2012. The university broke ground in March 2025 on a new learning commons/residence hall.

== Academics ==
Murray State University offers nearly 150 academic programs including undergraduate, graduate and doctoral degree options. Certificate programs, as well as online programs, are available as well. Academic colleges and schools include the Arthur J. Bauernfeind College of Business; the College of Education and Human Services; the College of Humanities and Fine Arts; the Jesse D. Jones College of Science, Engineering and Technology; the Hutson College of Agriculture; and the College of Nursing and Health Sciences.

Murray State has been institutionally accredited by the Southern Association of Colleges and Schools, Commission on Colleges, continuously since 1928. It is one of eight schools in the state of Kentucky to achieve AACSB accreditation of business programs; however, the school is not AACSB-accredited in accounting programs. Numerous other programs have achieved specialized accreditation: primarily programs in teaching, the sciences, business, fine arts and nursing. As a former normal school and teachers' college, Murray State is best known for its NCATE-accredited education programs. The Clinical Psychology Master's program is accredited by the Masters in Psychology and Counseling Accreditation Council (MPCAC). The university has also gained national recognition for its fine arts programs. The Department of Music has been a member of the National Association of Schools of Music since 1936.

=== Rankings ===
For more than 30 years, Murray State University has been recognized by U.S. News & World Report's Best Colleges as one of the top regional universities in the United States. The 2025 rankings listed Murray State as the #1 Best Value School in the South region. Murray State has consistently been one of the top-ranked public regional universities in Kentucky in the Regional Universities-South category, which consists of both private and public schools. Murray State has also been ranked by Forbes among America's Top Colleges since 2008.

	2019	2018	2017	2016	2015	2014	2013	2012	2011	2010	2009	2008	2007	2006	2005	2004	2003	2002
U.S. News & World Report Regional Universities - South (Overall)	24		35	28	26	24	20	25	22	20	18	14	15	17	21	21	18	18
U.S. News & World Report Regional Universities - South (Public Schools)	11		12	9	9	8	7	8	7	7	7	6	6	6	6	7	4	5
Forbes America's Top Colleges	613				588		547		481	421	322							

== Tuition policies ==
Presumably, due to its location near multiple state borders, Murray State offers discounts from its normal out-of-state tuition rates to residents of several regional states. These discounts apply only to residential students; all online students pay the same rate regardless of residency. Tuition for doctoral students also does not vary by state of residence.

- Residents of Alabama, Arkansas, Illinois, Indiana, Missouri, and Mississippi receive what Murray State calls a "regional" rate for both undergraduate and graduate programs.
- Residents of Tennessee receive the regional rate for graduate programs, but undergraduate programs receive a special rate between the regional and in-state rates.
- Residents of specific counties in Illinois, Indiana, and Tennessee are treated as Kentucky residents for tuition purposes:
  - Illinois: Massac County (directly across the Ohio River from Paducah, the largest city in Murray State's home Purchase region)
  - Indiana: Posey, Vanderburgh, and Warrick counties (all directly across the Ohio from Kentucky; Evansville is in Vanderburgh County)
  - Tennessee: Henry, Montgomery, Obion, Stewart, and Weakley counties (all bordering Kentucky; Clarksville is in Montgomery County)

== Campus life ==
Undergraduate demographics as of Fall 2023
Race and ethnicity	Total
White	79%
Black	6%
International student	4%
Unknown	4%
Hispanic	3%
Two or more races	3%
Asian	1%
Economic diversity
Low-income (Note: The percentage of students who received an income-based federal Pell grant intended for low-income students.)	36%
Affluent (Note: The percentage of students who are a part of the American middle class at the bare minimum.)	64%

=== Residential colleges ===
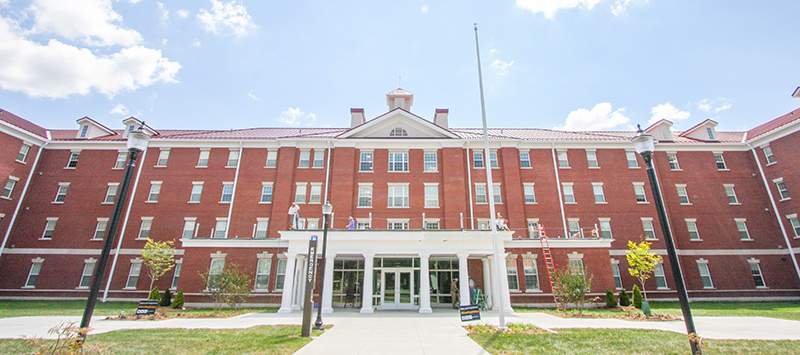
HC Franklin Residence Hall at Murray State University

As of fall 2012, Murray State had 2,831 students living on campus. Murray State has said that it was the first public university in the United States to adopt a successful campus-wide residential college program. The residential college structure, which took form on the campus in 1996, is based on similar, but much more established programs at the Universities of Oxford and Cambridge in the United Kingdom as well as Yale University, Harvard College and Princeton University in the United States.

There are eight residential colleges:

- Clark College, named for Lee Clark, who assisted Rainey T. Wells in founding the university. Clark later served as the superintendent of grounds and buildings. The current Clark College opened in August 2007 as the first new residence hall built on campus since 1970. It is also the first residence hall at Murray to be specifically designed to support the residential college concept.
- Elizabeth College, named for Elizabeth Harkless Woods, wife of fourth Murray State President Ralph H. Woods
- Hart College, named for George Hart, a board of regents member and mayor of Murray
- Hester College, named for Cleo Gillis Hester, who served Murray State University from 1927 to 1960, as registrar
- Regents College, named in honor of those who have served on the Murray State University Board of Regents; completed in 1970
- Richmond College, named for the third president of the university, James H. Richmond
- Springer-Franklin College, named for O.B. Springer, member of the board of regents from 1950 to 1958 and 1960 to 1970, and Hollis C. Franklin, who served on the board from 1947 to 1956
- White College, named for R.H. "Bob" White, a board of regents member

=== Greek life ===
Murray State is home to twenty-six chapters of both social and professional Greek organizations. The oldest social fraternity on campus is Phi Mu Alpha Sinfonia and the oldest professional fraternity is Sigma Alpha Iota (both relating to music) with the oldest social sorority being Sigma Sigma Sigma. As of the spring 2016 semester, 1,438 students were officially reported to be involved with Greek life, representing 19% of the undergraduate student population.

As of the fall of 2026, 15% of undergraduate students make up Murray State Greek Life. The average chapter size for the Panhellenic Council is 93; Interfraternity Council is 50; and National Pan-Hellenic Council is 5. The average Greek GPA is 3.20.

Men's social fraternities	Women's social fraternities and sororities	Professional fraternities/sororities
Phi Mu Alpha Sinfonia 1938–present; Pi Kappa Alpha 1958–present; Sigma Chi 1959–present; Tau Kappa Epsilon 1959–1991 (inactive); Alpha Tau Omega 1959–present; Lambda Chi Alpha 1968–present; Sigma Pi 1968–present; Alpha Gamma Rho 1968–present; Delta Sigma Phi 1968–1991 (inactive); Kappa Alpha Order 1969–1994; 2005–2008; 2018–2022; Sigma Phi Epsilon 1969–present; Sigma Nu 1969–1986 (inactive); Alpha Phi Alpha 1969–present; Omega Psi Phi 1970–present (rechartered 2014); Kappa Alpha Psi 1972–2014 (inactive); Phi Kappa Tau 1982–1988; 2005–2021 (inactive); Phi Beta Sigma 1982–present (rechartered 1998); Sigma Tau Gamma 1989–1999 (inactive); Alpha Sigma Phi 1994–present; Iota Phi Theta 2001–2012 (inactive); Kappa Sigma 2006–2010 (inactive)	Sigma Sigma Sigma 1942–present; Alpha Sigma Alpha 1946–present; Alpha Omicron Pi 1961–present; Alpha Gamma Delta 1966–present; Kappa Delta 1967–1984; 2013–present; Alpha Delta Pi 1968–present; Delta Sigma Theta 1970–present; Alpha Kappa Alpha 1971–present; Alpha Phi 1978–1990 (inactive); Zeta Phi Beta 2000–present; Delta Zeta 2016–present	Sigma Alpha Iota 1939–present; Alpha Phi Omega 1964–1974; 1991–1996 (inactive); Alpha Kappa Psi 1966–2021 (inactive); Alpha Zeta 1981–present; Sigma Alpha 2001–present

The Order of Omega has a chapter on campus. This organization is an honor society for fraternity and sorority members. Membership is limited to 5% of the Greek community. The Greek community also featured a local sorority from 1988 to 1994. Theta Chi Delta sorority was a member of MSU's Panhellenic Council and participated in most campus events. In 1994 the sorority became a colony of Phi Sigma Sigma but the colonization was unsuccessful and the organization folded in 1995.

Greek life has been banned on campus several times in past decades, namely 2012 and 2018. The 2012 incidents involved Alpha Gamma Rho and Alpha Tau Omega fraternity houses. The 2018 ban on Greek life and social events followed the death of 19-year-old Zach Wardrip.

== Athletics ==
Murray State Athletics wordmark

The Murray State athletic teams are called the Racers. Their historic nickname had been the "Thoroughbreds", but all teams changed over time to "Racers", with the last holdout of baseball making the change in 2014. The university is a member of the NCAA Division I ranks (for football, the Football Championship Subdivision), primarily competing in the Missouri Valley Conference (MVC) since the 2022–23 academic year. The Racers previously competed in the Ohio Valley Conference (OVC) from 1948–49 to 2021–22; and in the Kentucky Intercollegiate Athletic Conference (currently known as the River States Conference (RSC) since the 2016–17 school year) of the National Association of Intercollegiate Athletics (NAIA) from 1933–34 to 1947–48.

Murray State competes in 15 intercollegiate varsity sports. Men's sports include baseball, basketball, cross country, football, and golf. Women's sports include basketball, cross country, golf, soccer, softball, tennis, track & field, and volleyball; and co-ed sports include rifle.

=== Move to the MVC ===
In July 2022, Murray State and Belmont left the OVC to join the MVC. Because the MVC does not sponsor football, Murray State remained in OVC football for the 2022 season before leaving for the Missouri Valley Football Conference (a separate entity from the MVC) in 2023. MSU maintains OVC membership in rifle, another sport not sponsored by the MVC.

=== Accomplishments ===
Murray State's men's basketball program has made 18 appearances in the NCAA Tournament, most recently in 2022. In 2010, as a 13-seed, Murray State won their second-ever NCAA tournament game on a buzzer-beater against 4th-seeded Vanderbilt. Mark Gottfried coached the Racers to three Ohio Valley Conference Championships all three years he coached there, the only OVC coach to accomplish such a mark. The Racer men's basketball team was also led to the 2012 OVC championship by Coach Steve Prohm.

Frank Beamer and Houston Nutt are both former Racers head coaches. Former Maryland head coach Ralph Friedgen was a Racers assistant under Beamer, and former Illinois head coach Ron Zook was an assistant under former ESPN college football analyst Mike Gottfried, who was Beamer's predecessor as head coach.

== Publications ==
The Murray State News is the student newspaper of Murray State University. The newspaper has been the recipient of several ACP Pacemaker awards, the highest award given to collegiate newspapers, most recently in 2004. In October 2013 the newspaper won third place best-in-show for four-year weekly broadcast at the National College Media Convention in New Orleans. The Murray State News gained notoriety between 1998 and 2001 through the work of cartoonist Darin Shock. Shock earned the honor of top college cartoonist in the nation from the College Media Advisers in 2000. He had earned second-place honors the previous year.

Gateway Magazine is a full-color, glossy magazine published annually as an imprint of The Murray State News.

The school yearbook, The Shield, won the Pacemaker award for yearbooks in 2000, 2001, and 2002. The Shield ceased publication with its 2008 edition due to financial concerns.

The university's national literary magazine, New Madrid with editor Ann Neelon, featured work from a range of nationally recognized authors and received acclaim from sources as diverse as La Bloga, a leading Hispanic journal, and New Pages, a leading national review of literary magazines. A lack of funding led to the suspension of publication in 2018.

== Presidents ==
Presidents of the university include:

1. John W. Carr, 1923–1926
2. Rainey T. Wells, 1926–1932
3. John W. Carr, 1933–1936
4. James H. Richmond, 1936–1945
5. Ralph H. Woods, 1945–1968
6. Harry M. Sparks, 1968–1973
7. Constantine W. Curris, 1973–1983
8. Kala M. Stroup, 1983–1990
9. James L. Booth, 1989–1990 (Acting)
10. Ronald J. Kurth, 1990–1994
11. Samuel Kern Alexander, 1994–2001
12. Fieldon King Alexander, 2001–2005
13. Samuel Kern Alexander, 2006 (interim)
14. Tim Miller, 2006 (interim)
15. Randy J. Dunn, 2006–2013
16. Tim Miller, 2013–2014
17. Robert O. Davies, 2014–2018
18. Robert L. Jackson, 2018–2025
19. Ron K. Patterson, 2025–present
