= Jane Close Conoley =

American academic administrator

7th President of California State University, Long Beach
- In office January 29, 2014 – June 30, 2025
- Preceded by: F. King Alexander
- Succeeded by: Andrew Jones (acting)

Chancellor of the University of California, Riverside
- Interim
- In office 2012–2013
- Preceded by: Timothy P. White
- Succeeded by: Kim A. Wilcox

Personal details
- Education: College of New Rochelle (BA); University of Texas at Austin (PhD)

Academic background
- Thesis: The effects of interdependent learning tasks and role play on sociometric patterns, work norm measures, and behavior in the elementary classroom (1976)

Academic work
- Discipline: psychology

Jane Close Conoley is an American retired academic administrator who served as the president of California State University, Long Beach from 2014 to 2025. She previously served as Chancellor of University of California, Riverside in an acting capacity from 2012 to 2013.

== Education ==
Conoley was awarded a New York State Regents full scholarship and graduated cum laude with a Bachelor of Arts degree in psychology, with minors in biology and philosophy, from the College of New Rochelle. She subsequently obtained a Ph.D. in school psychology from the University of Texas at Austin in 1976.

== Career ==
After receiving her doctorate degree, Conoley spent four years as an assistant professor of psychology at Syracuse University before moving to Texas Woman's University and later to University of Nebraska–Lincoln in which she became department chair of Educational Psychology and then associate dean for Research and Curriculum. She served as dean at Texas A&M University and University of California, Santa Barbara before becoming interim chancellor of the University of California, Riverside following the resignation of former chancellor Tim White, who became the Chancellor of the California State University System. Prior to being selected as the interim chancellor for UC Riverside, Conoley was the dean of the Gevirtz Graduate School of Education at the University of California, Santa Barbara from January 2006 to December 30, 2012, a position which she publicly stated she intended to resume upon the completion of her tenure as interim chancellor of UC Riverside. On January 29, 2014, Conoley was announced as the new president of California State University, Long Beach. In November 2024, she announced that she would be retiring from the position at the end of the 2024-25 academic year.

=== Affiliations ===
Conoley is a Fellow of the American Psychological Association and the Association for Psychological Science. She is also a member of the American Educational Research Association and the Society for the Study of School Psychology, as of 2004.
