= Randy Dunn =

American academic administrator

Randy J. Dunn
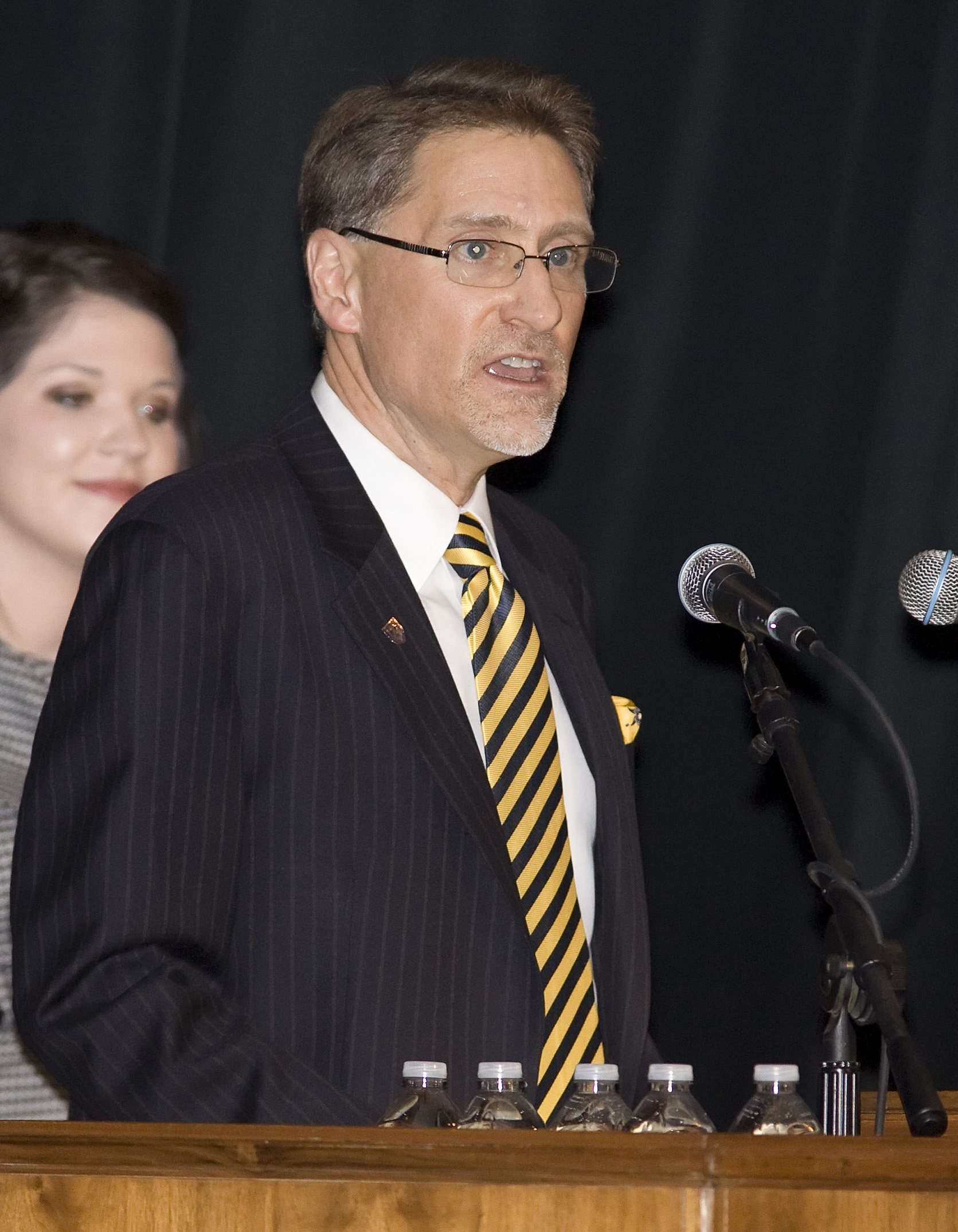
- Randy Dunn as president of Murray State University in February, 2011

8th President of Southern Illinois University
- In office May 1, 2014 – July 30, 2018
- Preceded by: Glenn Poshard

8th President of Youngstown State University
- In office July 15, 2013 – March 21, 2014
- Preceded by: Cynthia Anderson
- Succeeded by: Jim Tressel

12th President of Murray State University
- In office December 1, 2006 – July 8, 2013
- Preceded by: F. King Alexander
- Succeeded by: Thomas I. Miller

Personal details
- Spouse: Ronda Baker (m. 2007)
- Education: Illinois State University (BS); Illinois State University (MS); University of Illinois (EdD)

Randy J. Dunn is an American academic administrator. He was most recently the president of Southern Illinois University. He formerly served as president of Youngstown State University and Murray State University. Both of his previous presidential terms ended in controversy. Dunn submitted his resignation as the president of Southern Illinois University on July 13, 2018 amidst controversial actions within the university's system.

== Early life and career ==
Randy Dunn graduated from Westmer High School in Mercer County, Illinois in 1976. He earned his Bachelor of Science degree in teacher education from Illinois State University in 1980. He also completed his master's degree in educational administration and foundations from Illinois State in 1983. Dunn received his doctorate in educational administration from the University of Illinois at Urbana–Champaign in 1991.

Randy Dunn began his career as a fourth-grade elementary teacher at Gibson City, Illinois Grade School, where he worked from 1980 to 1983. He moved into educational administration when he took the position of principal at Paw Paw, Illinois Grade School for the 1983–84 school year. He then moved on to Roanoke-Benson Middle School in Benson, Illinois, where he served as principal from 1984 to 1989. Dunn worked as superintendent of schools in Argenta, Illinois from 1989 to 1991. He then served as superintendent of schools in Chester, Illinois from 1991 to 1994. After leaving Chester, Dunn worked as an assistant professor at Memphis State University for one year before taking a position as an associate professor at Southern Illinois University Carbondale in 1995. Dunn later became a department chair at SIU in 2000.

In 2004, Illinois governor Rod Blagojevich handpicked Randy Dunn to be the interim Illinois State Superintendent of Education. Soon after his appointment to the position, Dunn affirmed his allegiance to Blagojevich, stating "I am a member of the governor's leadership team, and I didn't come on board to take a position that is at odds with the governor's stated positions." In Dunn's first move as superintendent, he hired two high level employees, a new budget director and a new general counsel, who had been pre-selected for the positions by the Blagojevich administration. In August 2005, the Illinois State Board of Education made Dunn's appointment permanent, by removing "interim" from his title and extending his contract through January 2007.

== Murray State tenure ==
In May 2006, Dunn was selected to become president of Murray State University. The Murray State board of regents approved Dunn's hiring by a 7–4 vote during a special meeting in May 2006. Dunn originally told the board that he would not accept the Murray State presidency without a near-unanimous vote from the board of regents, but he changed his mind and accepted the position after talking with his supporters on the board. Dunn was selected to replace King Alexander, who left Murray State in 2005 to take a job as the president of California State University, Long Beach. At the time of his selection, Dunn was on leave as chairman of the Department of Educational Administration and Higher Education at Southern Illinois University Carbondale. Randy Dunn took office at Murray State on December 1, 2006.

During Dunn's tenure as president, the Hold Thy Banner High campaign came to a close. The fundraising campaign, which began in 2005 prior to Dunn's presidency, ended in October 2012. The campaign raised $71.73 million to benefit student scholarship endowments, support athletics, purchase new research and laboratory equipment, and advance campus improvements. The campaign was the largest fundraising effort in the history of the university, and it included a $3.3 million donation to the athletic department that resulted in renaming the Regional Special Events Center as the CFSB Center along with construction of a new basketball practice facility.

In 2008, Dunn had announced a highly publicized goal of increasing enrollment to 12,000 students at Murray State by 2012. When Dunn took office at Murray State in 2006, total enrollment was at 10,304. In the next two years, enrollment fell to 10,156 in 2007 and 10,022 in 2008. Following the enrollment campaign, the university did experience marginal growth. 2012 total enrollment was 10,832; however, that total was only about 500 students more than when Dunn took office 6 years earlier and significantly short of the 12,000 student goal.

In 2010, Dunn applied for the position of president of the University of Tennessee. In October of that year, the UT presidential search panel announced that Randy Dunn was not among the finalists for the position. Dunn applied for the vacant president position at Missouri State University, and he was announced as one of the finalist for that position in September 2012. After visiting the campus during final interviews in October, Dunn stated that the Missouri State position would be his capstone presidency and that it was exactly the kind of place where his background would be beneficial. He then announced on October 15 that he was withdrawing his candidacy for the position. In his statement regarding the decision, he stated that "it has become increasingly clear to me in the past few days from various statements, reports, and editorial commentary that the Springfield community has wanted “one of their own” to provide the next era of leadership for Missouri State. As such, I have come to the conclusion that—even if I were to be chosen to be Missouri State's next president—the level of support necessary as an external candidate to guide that institution into a bold and dynamic future would be lacking." He then expressed his intent to remain at Murray State; however, less than two months later he applied and was named as one of three finalists for the position of Florida Education Commissioner. Dunn was ultimately passed over for the position in Florida.

On March 15, 2013, the Murray State board of regents voted 7–4 to let Randy Dunn's contract expire, rather than extending it beyond its June 30, 2014 expiration date. A report reviewed by board of regents members prior to the vote indicated that the university's academic standing had fallen since Dunn took over leadership, and enrollment at most of the regional campuses had fallen while enrollment at the main campus remained relatively flat during his tenure as president. The report showed that the university had dropped significantly in at least three major academic rankings. The report also highlighted a deteriorating relationship between Dunn and the board of regents, especially over the last year. Murray State's graduation rate dropped from 59 percent in 2006 to 51 percent in 2012, and the freshman retention rate dropped from 77 percent to 71 percent over the same time period. Controversy surrounded the contract vote, because it was preceded by social gathering the night before the vote at a Regent's home in Murray. During that gathering, a quorum of board members were present and informally discussed some university business. Opponents of the contract vote argued that the social gathering constituted an illegal meeting, because public notice was not issued prior to the social gathering and there was no record of minutes from the social gathering. Within a few weeks after the vote by the board of regents, news sources announced that Dunn had applied to, went through initial interview rounds, and was selected as a finalist for the president positions at both Illinois State University and Youngstown State University.

As a result of the complaints against the board of regents, a re-vote was held on May 10, 2013. In the second vote, the board of regents upheld their original 7-4 decision to let Randy Dunn's contract expire.

== Youngstown State tenure ==
On April 3, 2013, Dunn was named one of eight semi-finalists for the position of president of Youngstown State University in Youngstown, Ohio. Following a round of interviews held on April 12 and April 13, Dunn was named one of three finalists for the position. On May 10, Randy Dunn was named by the Youngstown State University board of trustees as the new president of the university. Dunn signed his employment contract with Youngstown State on June 7, 2013, and began his tenure on July 15. Under the contract, Dunn would earn $375,000 per year for three years and receive benefits including health care, term life insurance, disability insurance, residence in the newly remodeled Pollock House, an American-made car, and membership at a local country club and one civic club. Dunn will not receive pay increases each year under his contract.

On February 17, 2014, after serving as president of Youngstown State University for only seven months, Dunn announced that he would resign his position as president effective August 16, 2014. Dunn announced that he had accepted the position of president at Southern Illinois University. Before his resignation, members of the Youngstown State University Board of Trustees, including its chair Dr. Sudershan Garg, indicated surprise when the news broke on February 16. Dunn had not notified them that he was a candidate for the position at SIU. Confusion continued the following day as Dunn did not appear as expected at an event for prospective students, where he was to speak. Later that day, the YSU Board of Trustees accepted his resignation with 180 days notice as allowed under his contract, though the contract also allows the board to terminate his employment without notice. Dunn did not notify the board of his potential job offer as SIU asked for confidentiality. Jim Tressel was announced as the next President of Youngstown State University to replace Dr. Randy Dunn.

On Wednesday, March 5, 2014, following an executive session by the Youngstown State University trustees, the university announced that it had voided Dunn's contract. The board of trustees and Dunn's attorneys agreed to the amended contract, which allowed for his departure on March 21. As a result, Dunn was ordered to vacate the university's presidency on March 21 and move out of the presidential residence by April 20. Provost Ikram Khawaja assumed the presidency on an interim basis after Dunn's departure.

== Southern Illinois University tenure ==
SIU presidential search firm William Funk & Associates approached Randy Dunn to be a nominee for the vacant president position in October 2013, only three months after he took office as president of Youngstown State. Dunn initially expressed reservations about being formally considered, but he told the search firm to keep him in mind. The search firm followed up again with Dunn in December and January. Dunn formally submitted his application for the presidency on January 10, and he interviewed with the SIU board on February 12 in St. Louis. His selection was announced on February 17, 2014.

Dunn was appointed president of Southern Illinois University effective May 1, 2014, and later had his contract renewed. Dunn stated, "This will be the last job for me. I do not plan to leave this position until retirement."

Dunn found himself in the middle of another controversy when an email surfaced in which he was caught stating a campus financial arrangement was discussed to "simply to shut up the bitchers from Carbondale..." Dunn was swiftly rebuked by two Illinois state legislators who called for his resignation.

The University Board of Trustees called a special meeting that was held June 21, 2018, to discuss Dunn's future employment as president. A motion was presented to suspend Dunn, but failed in a four-to-four vote; however, the board voted to release more than 1,800 pages of email correspondence that were obtained through a Freedom of Information Act request. Trustee Marsha Ryan called on Dunn to resign following the release of the documents.

The Board of Trustees announced Dunn's resignation on July 13, 2018. The Board of Trustees met in special session on July 16, 2018, to vote on termination and a severance package, with Dunn placed on leave effective July 17, 2018.

In May 2019, a report was released from the Executive Ethics Commission of the State of Illinois in which it was determined that Dunn was responsible for two incidences of improper hiring. The first incidence was Dunn's commitment to hiring the daughter and son-in-law of the late SIU Chancellor Carlo Montemagno as conditions of Montemagno's employment in 2017. Dunn was found to have skirted fair hiring practices through misapplication of Civil Service hiring rules and an improper search waiver that allowed both positions to be given to the couple non-competitively. Dunn was also alleged to have kept his actions secret from the Board of Trustees while simultaneously misrepresenting that the board approved of the search waiver.

The report also determined Dunn had abused search waivers while hiring his long-time friend and colleague Brad Colwell to the position of vice-president for student and academic affairs.

Colwell had previously served as the college's interim chancellor from 2015 until Montemagno was hired. Colwell had also been a candidate for the permanent position. Dunn oversaw his hiring to the VP position after Colwell lost the bid for chancellor. In April 2019, it was reported that Colwell had stepped down from his role as VP of student and academic affairs due to the investigation into his hiring. He now teaches at the university.

== Personal life ==
He began dating Dr. Ronda Baker in 2006 while he was the Illinois State Superintendent of Education and she was a regional superintendent in southern Illinois. They married in a ceremony held at the president's home, known as Oakhurst, on the Murray State campus in October 2007.
