= F. King Alexander =

American university administrator

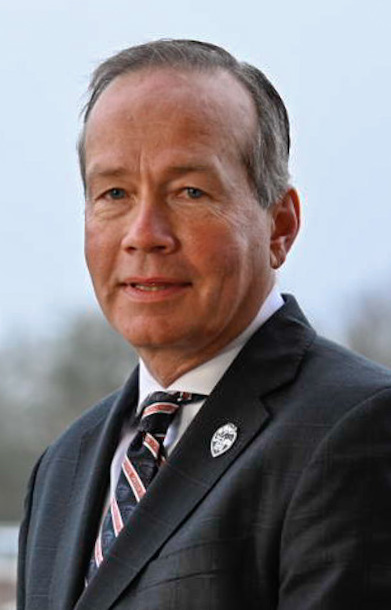
- Alexander in 2019

15th President of Oregon State University
- In office July 1, 2020 – April 1, 2021
- Preceded by: Ed Ray
- Succeeded by: Jayathi Y. Murthy

26th President of Louisiana State University
- In office July 1, 2013 – December 31, 2019
- Preceded by: John V. Lombardi
- Succeeded by: Thomas C. Galligan Jr. (Interim)

6th President of California State University, Long Beach
- In office January 1, 2006 – June 30, 2013
- Preceded by: Robert Maxson
- Succeeded by: Jane Close Conoley

10th President of Murray State University
- In office September 2001 – December 2005
- Preceded by: S. Kern Alexander
- Succeeded by: Randy J. Dunn

Personal details
- Born: Louisville, Kentucky, U.S.
- Spouse(s): Elizabeth Williams Alexander (died 2000); Shenette Campbell Alexander (since 2006)
- Children: 2
- Parents: Kern Alexander (father); Ruth H. Alexander (mother)
- Education: St. Lawrence University (BA); University of Oxford (MSc); University of Wisconsin–Madison (PhD)

Academic background
- Thesis: An analysis of the effects of Title IV federal direct student aid policy on public and private institutions of higher education (1996)
- Doctoral advisor: Julie Underwood

Fieldon King Alexander is an American former university administrator and professor of higher education policy and finance. He was the president of Oregon State University, Louisiana State University, California State University, Long Beach, and Murray State University.

== Early life and career ==
Alexander is an inductee of the Boy's and Girl's Club Hall of Fame.

Alexander received a bachelor's degree in political science from St. Lawrence University. After completing his master's degree at Oxford, Alexander worked as Coordinator of External Programs and then as Director of Annual Giving at the University of North Carolina at Greensboro prior to pursuing his Ph.D. at the University of Wisconsin-Madison.

== University presidencies ==
=== Murray State University ===
Alexander served as the 10th president of Murray State University in Kentucky from 2001 to 2005, his predecessor being his father Kern Alexander. Murray State's faculty senate passed a resolution condemning the closed process behind his appointment by the university's board of regents, which had named itself as the search committee.

As president, Alexander improved the relationship between faculty and the administration and oversaw the construction or renovation of several campus buildings, including the Alexander Hall Education Building and the Susan E. Bauernfeind Student Recreation and Wellness Center.

Alexander was invited to testify to the U.S. House of Representatives subcommittee on 21st Century Competitiveness in the 108th Congress in 2003. Alexander was a Foundation Fellow at Harris Manchester College and a faculty affiliate at the University of Illinois and Cornell University.

=== California State University, Long Beach ===
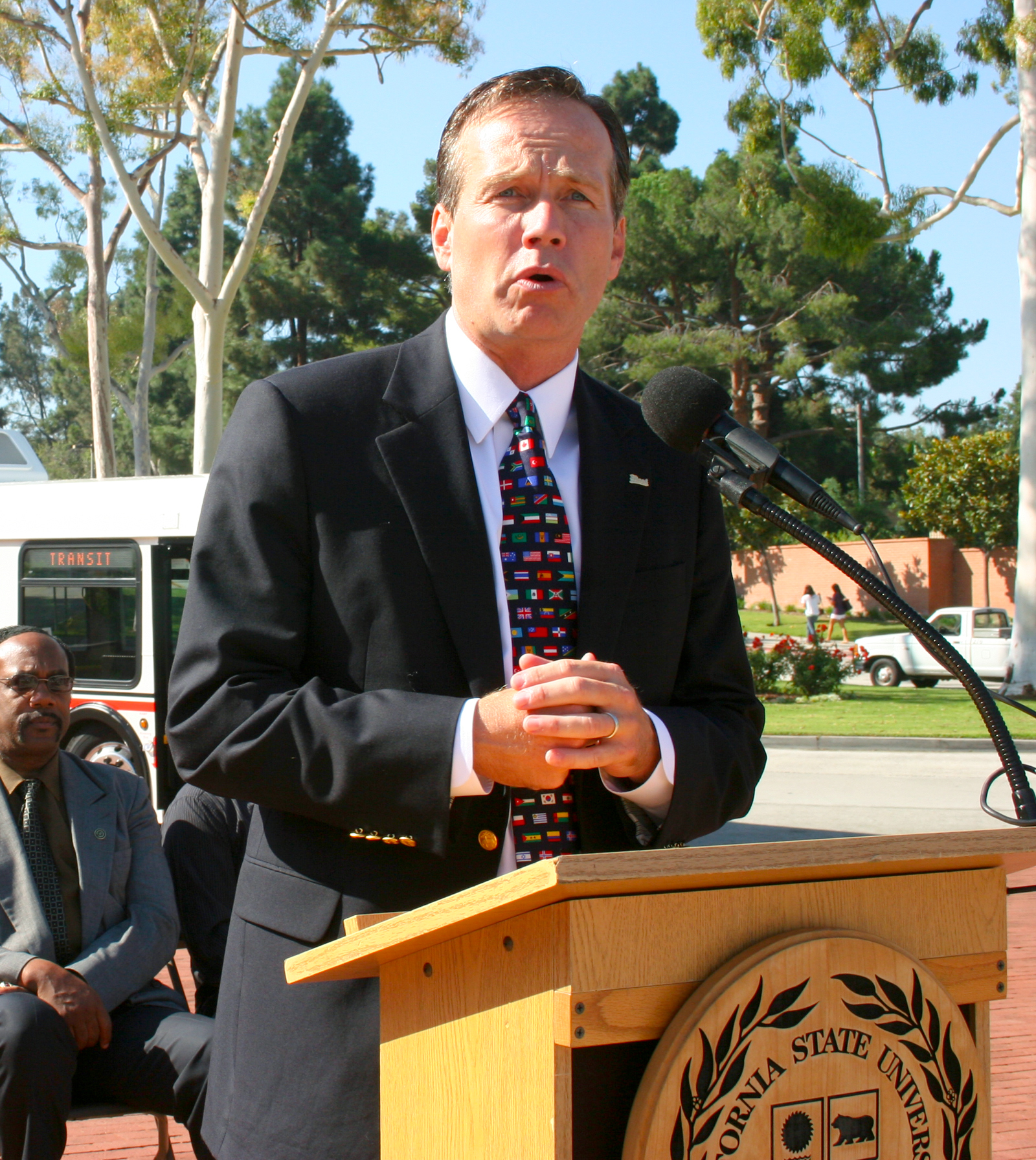
Alexander in 2008

F. King Alexander was appointed as president of California State University, Long Beach in 2006. During his time at CSULB, a new $70 million Student Recreation Wellness Center was completed along with a $110 million Hall of Science building.

On May 15, 2013, the California Conference for Equality and Justice presented him with the Humanitarian Award. Cal State Long Beach's focus on improving graduation numbers and rates for all student populations, especially from underrepresented populations, gained national attention.

Alexander was an original signatory to the Long Beach College Promise. Alexander was invited to testify to the U.S. House of Representatives hearing on "Barriers to Equal Educational Opportunities: Addressing the Rising Costs of a College Education" (November 1, 2007). The Committee on Education and Labor, U.S. House of Representatives, 110th Congress. For his efforts in supporting students access, success and improved student aid programs, Alexander was selected by the California State University Student Association as California State University President of the Year in 2009–10.

=== Louisiana State University ===
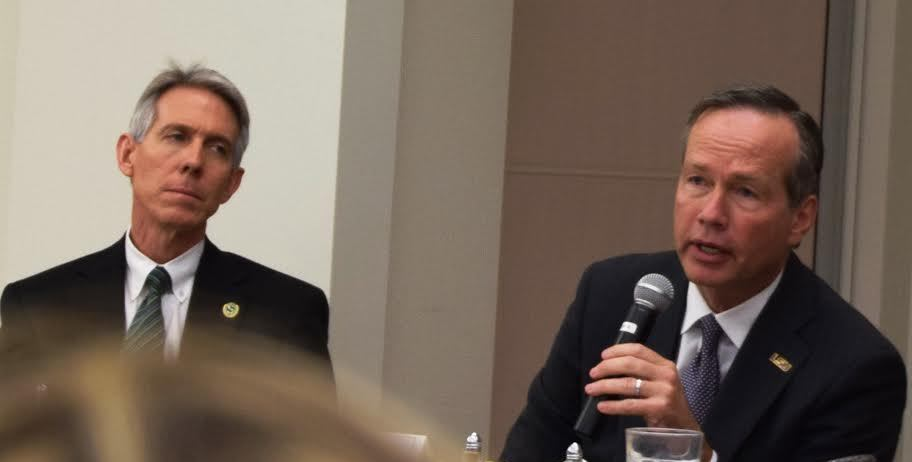
With John L. Crain (left), President of Southeastern Louisiana University, Alexander responds to questions about funding for Louisiana's public universities, on a panel hosted by the Greater Hammond Chamber of Commerce during 2015.

It was announced on March 27, 2013, that Alexander would become president of the LSU system and chancellor of Louisiana State University A&M effective July 1, 2013. Some criticism occurred over the way the Louisiana State University Board of Supervisors had conducted its search to fill the position of president of LSU after John V. Lombardi had been fired from it under alleged influence by Governor Bobby Jindal and as Alexander was named the sole finalist for president of LSU.

The decision was met with a unanimous vote of no confidence by LSU's faculty senate against the LSU Board of Supervisors, but Board of Supervisors chair Hank Danos asserted that Alexander "was clearly the right guy for LSU." The Faculty Senate's vote of no confidence in Alexander's hiring noted that Alexander had never been a tenured full professor at a major research university and that the graduation rates at CSULB were lower than those at LSU.

=== Oregon State University ===
Alexander was elected to become President of Oregon State University on December 13, 2019, by the Oregon State University Board of Trustees. He assumed office on July 1, 2020. He resigned from Oregon State University after just eight months. His resignation followed a vote of no confidence by Oregon State's Faculty Senate and a subsequent statement by Oregon Governor Kate Brown that the Oregon State Board of Trustees needed to "take decisive action to remove" Alexander from the presidency at OSU

== Personal life ==
Alexander's first wife, Elizabeth Williams Alexander, died of breast cancer in 2000. In 2006 he married Shenette (Campbell) Alexander.

== Oxford Round Table ==
F. King Alexander and family members have been involved with the foundation and running of the Oxford Round Table, otherwise known as the Oxford Symposia, since 1989.

== Publications ==
- Alexander, Kern; Salmon, Richard G.; Alexander, F. King (2015). Financing public schools: theory, policy, and practice. New York: Routledge. ISBN 978-0-415-64534-8.
- Alexander, F. King; Ehrenberg, Ronald G., eds. (2003). Maximizing Revenue in Higher Education. San Francisco: Jossey-Bass. ISBN 9780787972219.
- Alexander, Kern; Alexander, F. King, eds. (2002). The University: International Expectations. McGill-Queen's University Press. ISBN 9780773569546.
- Alexander, F. King; Robertson, Don E., eds. (1998). Residential Colleges: Reforming American Higher Education. Lexington, KY: Oxford International Round Table.
