= Kern Alexander =

American academic (born 1939)

S. Kern Alexander

President of Western Kentucky University
- In office 1985–1988

President of Murray State University
- In office 1994–2001
- Preceded by: Ronald Kurth
- Succeeded by: F. King Alexander

Personal details
- Born: June 30, 1939 Marrowbone, Kentucky, U.S.
- Spouse(s): Ruth H. Alexander (m. 1961, divorced) Elizabeth (Bohon) Alexander
- Children: Samuel Kern Alexander III; Fieldon King Alexander; Klinton West Alexander; Wesley Kane Alexander
- Education: B.A, Centre College; M.A., Western Kentucky University; Ed.D., Indiana University

Samuel Kern Alexander Jr. (born June 30, 1939) is Professor of Excellence at the University of Illinois Urbana-Champaign, where he is endowed by the O'Leary Endowment and Editor of the Journal of Education Finance, published by the University of Illinois Press and Project MUSE of Johns Hopkins University.

== Personal life ==
Samuel Kern Alexander Jr. was born in Marrowbone, Kentucky in 1939. Kern earned his Bachelor of Arts degree with a double major in English and History from Centre College in 1961. While at Centre, Alexander was quarterback and captain of Centre's football team and was initiated into Delta Kappa Epsilon. In 1960, he was named Honorable Mention All-American. While a senior at Centre, Kern Alexander met his first wife, Ruth Hammack. Hammack was a native of Paint Lick, Kentucky, and she graduated from Milligan College in 1960. Hammack moved to Danville, Kentucky for a teaching job after graduating from college. They married in 1961. The Alexanders moved to Bowling Green, Kentucky, where Kern earned a master's degree from Western Kentucky University in 1962. Kern and Ruth Alexander had two children Samuel Kern Alexander III and Fieldon King Alexander, and then the Alexanders moved to Indiana, where Kern completed his Ed.D. in Educational Administration from Indiana University in 1965, and a Diploma in Educational Studies from Oxford University, with distinction, 1977. The Alexanders went on to have two more children: Klinton West Alexander and Wesley Kane Alexander.

== Academic career ==
Prior to coming to the University of Illinois he served as President of two American state universities (Western Kentucky University and Murray State University), was a tenured distinguished professor at the University of Florida, Gainesville, University Distinguished Professor at Virginia Tech and held the Robinson Eminent Scholar Chair at the University of North Florida, Jacksonville. As President of Western Kentucky University, 1985–88, he founded the institution's community college and opened the Glasgow, Kentucky, branch of the university. His time at WKU was marked by multiple controversies, ending with a failed attempt to install faculty editors to oversee the independent student newspaper and yearbook. As President of Murray State, Alexander began a residential college system and founded the Hopkinsville, Paducah, and Henderson campuses of Murray State. Alexander Hall at Murray State is named after him and his presidency at that institution. He is the author or co-author of 25 books on education finance and law and has served as finance expert in state school finance litigation in 22 American states.

Alexander founded the Oxford Round Table, a series of interdisciplinary conferences held at various colleges in the University of Oxford, in 1989. He has been closely involved with the Round Table ever since, often serving as its president.

In his autobiography, My Life, President Bill Clinton quoted Alexander and described him as a nationally recognized expert on education policy.

Alexander holds a graduate diploma (with distinction) from the University of Oxford and an Ed.D. from Indiana University Bloomington.

== Books ==
- 2019. Alexander, K. and M. D. Alexander, American Public School Law, 9th Edition. West Academic Publisher: St. Paul, MN
- 2018. Alexander, S., Alexander, w., David, M. The Law of Schools, Students and Teachers in a Nutshell, 6th Edition. West Publishing Company: St. Paul, MN.
- 2017. Alexander, K. Higher Education Law: Policy and Perspectives, 2nd Edition. Routledge/Taylor & Francis: New York, NY.
- 2015. Alexander, K., Salmon, D., and F. King Alexander, Financing Public Schools: Theory, Policy, and Practice.. Routledge/Taylor & Francis: New York, NY.
- 2012. Alexander, S., Alexander, M. American Public School Law, 8th Edition. Wadsworth Cengage Learning: Belmont, CA.
- 2008. Alexander, S. Education and Economic Growth: Investment and Distribution of Financial Resources. Linton Atlantic Books, Ltd: Yarnton, Oxon. United Kingdom.
- 2004. Alexander, S., Hunter, R. Administering Special Education : in pursuit of dignity and autonomy. Elsevier: Amsterdam.
- 1995. Alexander, S. Public School Finance. Allyn and Bacon: Boston, MA.
- 1972. Alexander, S., Solomon, E. College and University Law. Michie Co: Charlottesville, VA.
