= List of presidents of Clemson University =

Head of Clemson University

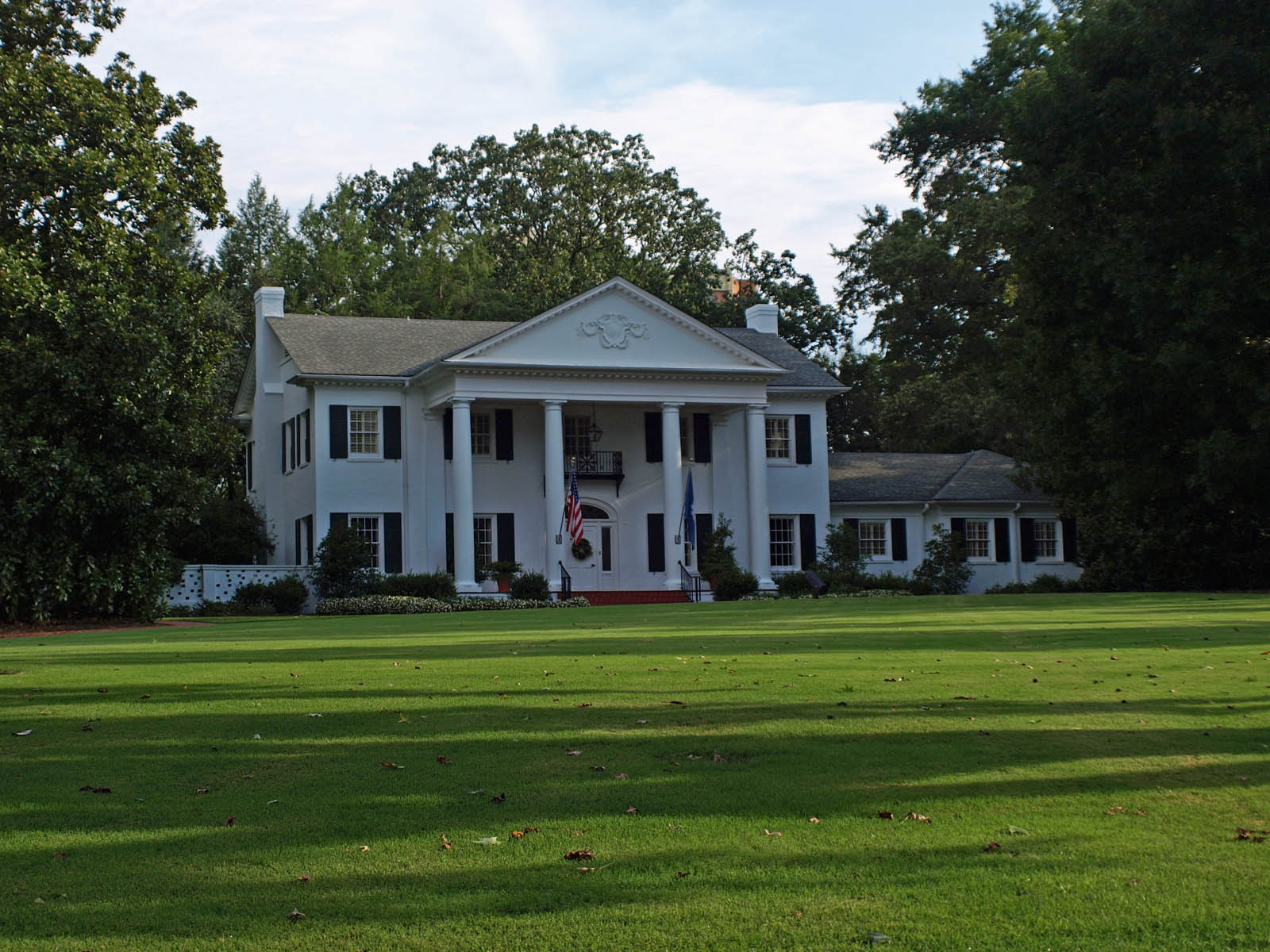
The President's House

Clemson University, founded in 1889, is a public research university located in Clemson, South Carolina. The university is led by a president, who is selected by the board of trustees. The president acts as the school's chief executive officer, reporting to the board, and is tasked with providing leadership to the faculty and students, and represents the institution in public.

The institution's first president was Henry Aubrey Strode, appointed in 1890, and its current is Benjamin C. Ayers, named on July 9, 2026. Robert Cook Edwards had the longest tenure at 21 years, and Walter T. Cox Jr. had the shortest at eight months. There have been three interim presidents, and six presidents who have been alumni of the university. As of 2022, the salary of the president was $987,530.

The first official residence for the president was completed in 1893, with president Craighead as its first resident. Walter Riggs, already a professor at the university, chose to remain in his house upon becoming president. Following his death, presidents Sikes and Poole also lived in the Riggs house. The current president's house was completed in 1959 for R. C. Edwards. The office of the president is housed in Sikes Hall.

== Presidents ==
List of presidents
No.	President	Term start	Term end	Ref.
Clemson Agricultural College of South Carolina (1889–1964)
1	Henry Aubrey Strode (Note: Previously head of the mathematics department at the University of Mississippi)	1890	1893	
2	Edwin Boone Craighead (Note: Previously professor of Greek and French at Wofford College)	1893	1897	
interim	Mark Bernard Hardin (Note: Served as interim president between administrations in 1897 and 1902, and during Hartzog's illness in 1899. Chair of the chemistry department at Clemson.)	1897	1897	
3	Henry Simms Hartzog (Note: Previously superintendent of the Johnston Institute)	1897	1902	
interim	Mark Bernard Hardin	1902	1902	
4	Patrick Hues Mell, Jr. (Note: Previously chair of the natural history department at Auburn University. Father was Chancellor of the University of Georgia and one of the first presidents of the Southern Baptist Convention.)	1902	1910	
5	Walter Merritt Riggs (Note: Previously director of the engineering department at Clemson)	1910	January 22, 1924 (Note: Died in office.)	
interim	Samuel Broadus Earle (Note: Served as interim president in 1919 while Riggs served as a director on the army overseas educational commission in France, and in 1924–1925 following Riggs' death. Director of the engineering department at Clemson.)	1924	1925	
6	Enoch Walter Sikes (Note: Previously president of Coker College)	1925	1940	
7	Robert Franklin Poole (BA 1916) (Note: Graduate of Clemson University (1916). Previously chairman of graduate programs at North Carolina State University.)	1940	1958	
Clemson University (1964–present)
8	Robert Cook Edwards (BA 1933) (Note: Graduate of Clemson University (1933). Previously vice president for development at Clemson.)	1958	1979	
9	Bill Lee Atchley (Note: Previously dean of engineering at West Virginia University)	1979	June 30, 1985 (Note: Resigned during an athletic department drug scandal.)	
10	Walter Thompson Cox Jr., (BA 1939) (Note: Graduate of Clemson University (1939). Previously vice president for student affairs at Clemson.)	July 1, 1985	February 28, 1986	
11	A. Max Lennon (Note: Previously vice president of agricultural administration and executive dean for agriculture, home economics, and natural resources at Ohio State University)	March 1, 1986	July 1994	
interim	Philip Hunter Prince, (BA 1949) (Note: Graduate of Clemson University (1949))	July 1994	September 30, 1994	
12	Philip Hunter Prince, (BA 1949)	September 30, 1994	May 31, 1995	
13	Constantine W. Curris (Note: Previously president of Murray State University and the University of Northern Iowa)	June 1, 1995	November 10, 1999 (Note: Resigned to head the American Association of State Colleges and Universities)	
14	James Frazier Barker, (BA 1970) (Note: Graduate of Clemson University (1970). Previously dean of architecture at Mississippi State University and Clemson.)	November 11, 1999	December 30, 2013	
15	James P. Clements (Note: Previously president of West Virginia University)	December 31, 2013	December 31, 2025	
interim	Robert H. Jones, (BS 1979, MS 1981) (Note: Served as interim president after the resignation of Clements. Graduate of Clemson University (BS 1979, MS 1981). Previously executive vice president for academic affairs and provost at Clemson.)	January 1, 2026	July 31, 2026	
16	Benjamin C. Ayers	August 1, 2026	present	

== Timeline of presidencies ==
Strode (1890–1893)
Craighead (1893–1897)
Hardin* (1897, 1899, 1902)
Hartzog (1897–1902)
Mell (1902–1910)
Riggs (1910–1924)
Earle* (1919, 1924–1925)
Sikes (1925–1940)
Poole (1940–1958)
Edwards (1958–1979)
Atchley (1979–1985)
Cox (1985–1986)
Lennon (1986–1994)
Prince (1994–1995)
Curris (1995–1999)
Barker (1999–2013)
Clements (2013–2025)
Jones* (2026)
Ayers (2026–present)
│
1889
│
1899
│
1909
│
1919
│
1929
│
1939
│
1949
│
1959
│
1969
│
1979
│
1989
│
1999
│
2009
│
2019
Presidents of Clemson University (1889–present)
*Interim/acting president
