= Ben Ayers =

President of Clemson University

16th President of Clemson University
- Incumbent
- Assumed office August 1, 2026
- Preceded by: James P. Clements

Provost of the University of Georgia
- In office June 30, 2025 – July 31, 2026
- Preceded by: S. Jack Hu
- Succeeded by: Ron R. Walcott (Interim)

12th Dean of the University of Georgia Terry College of Business
- In office July 1, 2014 – June 29, 2025
- Preceded by: Robert Sumichrast
- Succeeded by: Santanu Chatterjee

Personal details
- Born: Benjamin Campbell Ayers; July 17, 1965 (age 61) Heflin, Alabama, U.S.
- Education: University of Alabama (BS, MTA); University of Texas (PhD)
- Website: www.clemson.edu/president/about/

Benjamin C. Ayers (born July 17, 1965) is an American academic administrator and accounting professor who is the 16th president of Clemson University in Clemson, South Carolina. He assumed office on August 1, 2026, after serving for a year as the senior vice president and provost of the University of Georgia.

Prior to his appointment as provost, Ayers was dean of UGA's Terry College of Business for 11 years. Ayers entered administration as director of the J.M. Tull School of Accounting for nine years prior to his selection as the 12th dean of the Terry College in 2014.

== Early life and education ==
Ayers grew up in Heflin, Alabama, where his parents were educators. He studied accounting and taxation at the University of Alabama, graduating summa cum laude with a Bachelor of Science degree in 1986 and a Master of Tax Accounting in 1987. He worked as a tax accountant for five years before entering the accounting doctoral program at the University of Texas McCombs School of Business, graduating in 1996.

== Career ==
=== Accounting career ===
Prior to pursuing his PhD, Ayers worked for KPMG in Atlanta and Tampa, Florida and Complete Health Inc. in Birmingham, Alabama from 1987 to 1992.

=== University of Georgia ===
Ayers joined the J.M. Tull School of Accounting faculty in 1996 as an assistant professor. The Tull School is housed in the Terry College of Business at the University of Georgia. He was promoted to associate professor with tenure in 2001 and full professor in 2006. He published empirical research in the areas of taxation and financial accounting and served at various times on the editorial boards of the Journal of the American Taxation Association, The Accounting Review, and Accounting Horizons.

Ayers was named director of the J.M. Tull School of Accounting in 2005 and served in that role for nine years prior to his appointment as the 12th dean of the Terry College of Business in 2014. During his time as dean, the Terry College launched a master's program in business analytics, an online MBA, an academic minor in business, and an entrepreneurship program open to students of all majors. From 2014 to 2025, the college's undergraduate enrollment grew by 40%, graduate enrollment rose 64%, and the college achieved the highest employment rates for graduating students in its history.

As provost, Ayers served as UGA's chief academic officer with primary responsibility for the university's teaching, research, and public service mission. The deans of UGA's 20 schools and colleges report to the provost, in addition to the vice presidents for instruction, research, public service and outreach, and information technology. During the 2025-26 academic year, Ayers led the creation of the Victoria Kay Ivester School of Nursing at UGA.

=== Clemson University ===
On July 9, 2026, Ayers was announced as president-elect of Clemson University by its board of trustees. He assumed the presidency on August 1, 2026, stating that his priorities would be to advance Clemson's academic reputation, strengthen research, expand student opportunities, and build philanthropic support.

== See also ==
List of presidents of Clemson University
