= Henry Aubrey Strode =

American university administrator

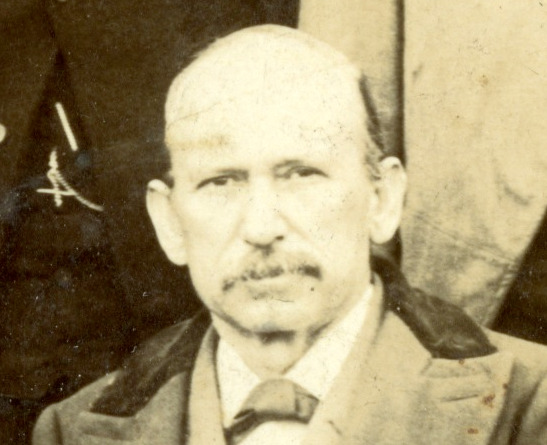
- Strode in 1894

1st President of Clemson University
- In office 1890–1893
- Preceded by: none
- Succeeded by: Edwin Boone Craighead

Personal details
- Born: February 6, 1844 Fredericksburg, Virginia, U.S.
- Died: September 1, 1898 (aged 54) Amherst, Virginia, U.S.
- Education: University of Virginia (B.A., M.A.)

Henry Aubrey Strode (February 6, 1844 – September 1, 1898) was an American academic and school administrator who served as the first president of Clemson University.

== Early life and career ==
Strode was born in Fredericksburg, Virginia, and enlisted in the Confederate States Army in 1861 at the age of 17. Following the war, he enrolled in the University of Virginia, graduating with a bachelor's degree in mathematics, and later with a master's degree. He taught at several preparatory schools and at Richmond College. In 1872 he married Mildred Powell Ellis, purchased Kenmore Farm from her grandfather, and started a prep school on site. The school took a progressive approach to education, eschewing classical education to focus on science and health. Strode closed the Kenmore school in 1889 and took a position as professor of mathematics at the University of Mississippi.

== President of Clemson ==
In 1889, the South Carolina Legislature accepted Thomas Green Clemson's bequest to start an institute of higher learning. The new trustees set about hiring a president, first courting Stephen D. Lee, the president of the A&M College of Mississippi (today Mississippi State University), who declined the offer. Their second choice was Strode, who accepted.

Strode's first tasks were overseeing the construction of campus, beginning analysis of fertilizer for sale in South Carolina, and starting the state Experiment Farm. Mark Bernard Hardin was hired as chief chemist and professor of chemistry, followed the next year by Richard Newman Brackett. J. S. Newman and J. F. Duggar were hired to run the experiment station. These moves were important to bring in funding via the Morrill Act of 1862, and the Hatch Act of 1887. Strode also hired more faculty, and in his role as professor of mathematics, helped develop the curriculum.

Difficulties in construction and in receiving funding from the state led to the delay in the school's opening from February 1892 to the following year. In June 1892, trustee and governor Benjamin Tillman moved that Strode stop being paid as president, though Tillman himself supported Strode's request for additional funding that the legislature denied. In November 1892 Strode resigned from his role as president, but stayed on as professor of mathematics. The reasons for his resignation are unclear, but historians speculate his declining health or frustration at infighting among trustees.

== Post-presidency ==
Strode continued as professor of mathematics until he resigned amid a minor reorganization in 1896. He returned to Kenmore and died in 1898.

== Family ==
One of Strode's sons was lawyer, politician, and eugenics proponent Aubrey E. Strode.
