= Kim A. Wilcox =

American academic administrator (born 1954)

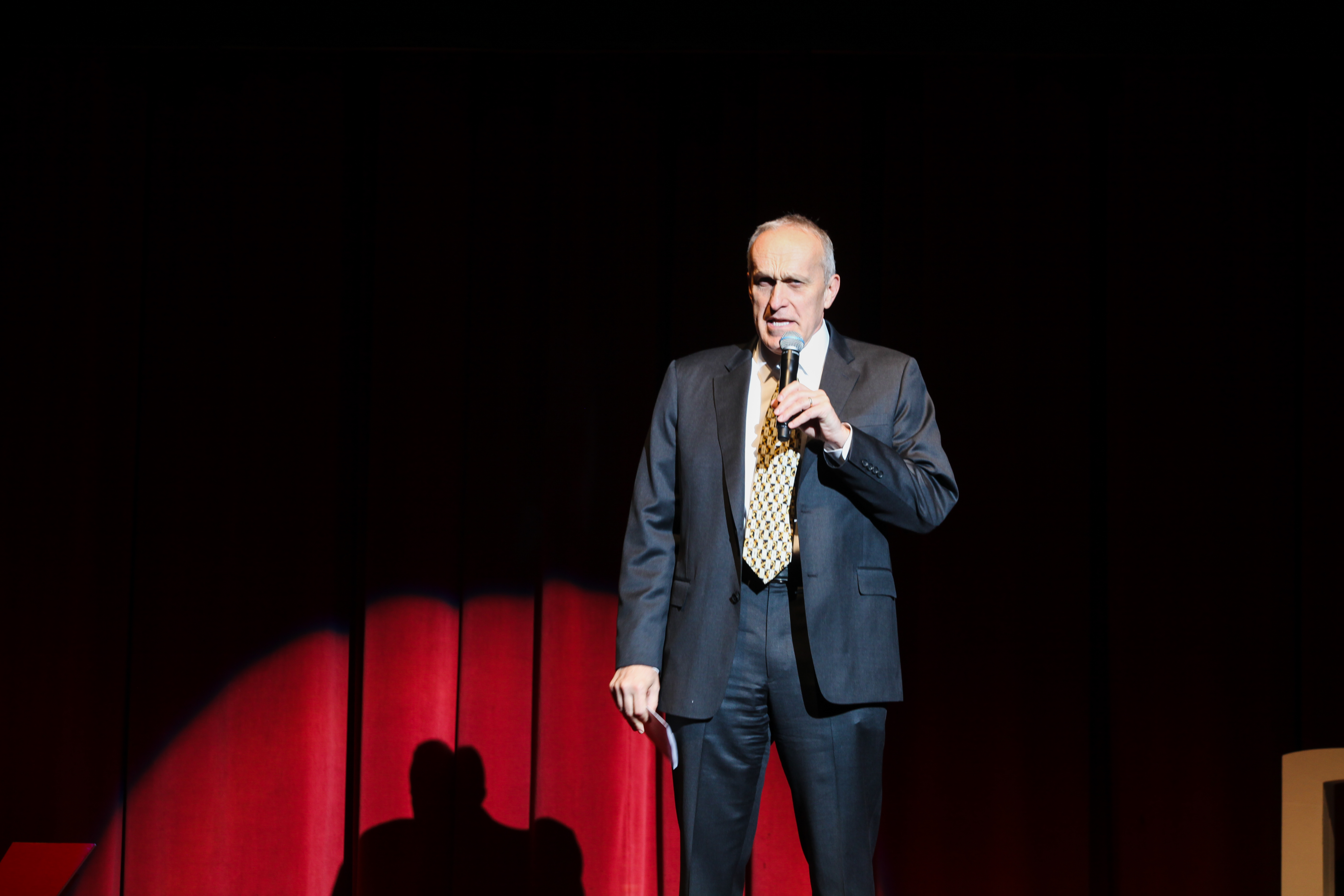
- Wilcox at TEDxRiverside 2014

9th Chancellor of the University of California, Riverside
- In office August 19, 2013 – July 15, 2025
- Preceded by: Timothy P. White
- Succeeded by: S. Jack Hu

Personal details
- Born: May 5, 1954 (age 72) Sault Ste. Marie, Michigan, U.S.
- Spouse: Diane Del Buono
- Education: Michigan State University (BS); Purdue University (MS, PhD)
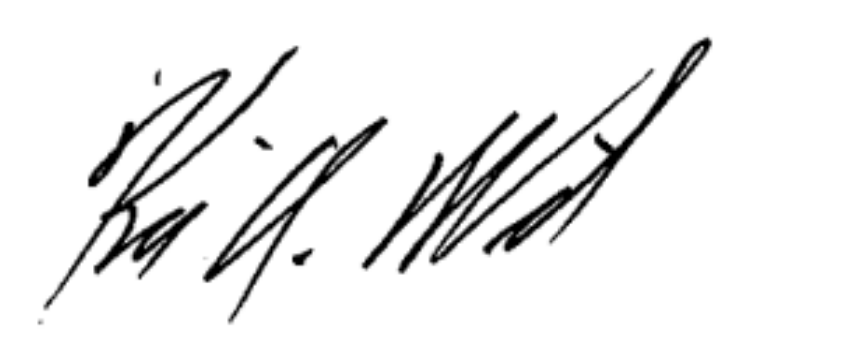
- Signature
- Website: Chancellor Kim A. Wilcox

Academic background
- Thesis: Identification and discrimination of normal and defective /s/ by /s/-misarticulating and normal children (1980)
- Doctoral advisor: Macalyne Fristoe

Academic work
- Discipline: Speech and Hearing Science
- Sub-discipline: Communicative Disorders
- Institutions: University of Kansas; Michigan State University; University of California, Riverside

Kim A. Wilcox (born May 5, 1954) is an American academic administrator, who served as the 9th chancellor of the University of California, Riverside from August 2013 to July 2025.

He was previously at Michigan State University where he served for eight years as provost, executive vice president and professor of communicative sciences and disorders. At Michigan State University, Wilcox was responsible for a major institutional restructuring that added 100 new faculty positions and expanded the university's two medical colleges.

Wilcox served as the president and CEO of the Kansas Board of Regents from 1999 to 2002, overseeing a major reorganization of education in the State of Kansas.

In September 2024, Wilcox announced his decision to retire as chancellor of UC Riverside in the summer of 2025.

== Early life and education ==
Wilcox was born on May 5, 1954, in Sault Ste. Marie, Michigan. He attended Michigan State University graduating with high honors in 1976. He subsequently completed a Master of Science and Doctor of Philosophy in speech and hearing science from Purdue University under the direction of Macalyne Fristoe.

== Career ==
Kim A. Wilcox was appointed as UC Riverside's ninth chancellor in August 2013. Since then, he has spurred a new era of growth of the campus, embarking on the expansion of the faculty by 300, development of new facilities for research, teaching, and public service, and a new emphasis on institutional globalization.

Under Wilcox's leadership, UC Riverside became a charter member of the University Innovation Alliance, a collaboration of major public research universities in America seeking to improve student graduation rates and outcomes across all socio-economic and ethnic backgrounds. Wilcox participated in the 2014 White House College Opportunity Day of Action, at which President Barack Obama recognized the Riverside County Education Collaborative and the participation of UCR and regional school districts in improving the pipeline from K-12 to two- and four-year colleges. Ted Mitchell, U.S. Under Secretary of Education, praised UC Riverside for its commitment to diversity and inclusion.

During Wilcox's tenure, UC Riverside has increased diversity among students, faculty, and administration, launched its first-ever $300 million fundraising campaign, set new milestones for research funding, and broke ground on a new Multidisciplinary Research Building.

Wilcox served as a consultant with the Washington D.C.–based non-profit organization "Partnership to Cut Poverty and Hunger in Africa".

=== Research ===
Wilcox's primary work has been in the acoustics of speech production. Much of his early work focused on the effects of neurological impairments to the speech musculature. His later work increasingly focused on developmental speech and language issues including remediation of speech disorders in children.

=== Criticism of college rankings ===
Wilcox has been a vocal critic of commercial college rankings such as those published by U.S. News & World Report. In a 2015 interview with the Washington Post, Wilcox argued that the U.S. News formula for ranking colleges was inconsistent with the mission of public higher education. The reporter describes Wilcox as believing that 'the U.S. News formula is mostly about wealth and perceptions. It rewards schools that raise and spend a lot of money... and provides little incentive for schools to become more efficient at serving students with disadvantages." In 2016, Wilcox published an opinion piece in the San Diego Union Tribune arguing that prospective college students should focus on rankings based on graduation and retention rates as opposed to those based on reputation and acceptance rates.

=== Leadership crisis ===
On November 29, 2016, the UC Riverside Faculty Senate held a town hall meeting to address widespread concerns about Wilcox's leadership. Concerns raised at the meeting included "inadequate planning for campus growth, poorly maintained facilities..., low morale," and "a feeling of disconnect between Chancellor Kim Wilcox's office and the university's 852 faculty members." In a December 5, 2016, letter to the Faculty Senate, Wilcox admitted the problems with his leadership, acknowledging that "Clearly, we have significant work ahead of us to rectify this situation."

On December 16, 2016, Wilcox's hand-picked choice for UC Riverside executive vice-chancellor and provost, Paul D'Anieri, resigned rather than face a vote of no confidence by the Faculty Senate. The faculty strongly objected to the "top-down" management style fostered by Wilcox and D'Anieri, to their incompetent handling of new faculty hires, and to the "climate of fear and mistrust" they had generated on campus. Despite claiming that "D'Anieri should not be blamed for decisions... that were made collectively by senior administrators", Wilcox accepted his subordinate's resignation.

A "cluster hiring" initiative spearheaded by Wilcox and D'Anieri had drawn sharp criticism from the Faculty Senate for its extremely poor planning and lack of transparency. A survey of the faculty in early 2016 found widespread agreement that the initiative had been poorly conceived and mismanaged. One professor commented that "The faculty, as far as I can tell, overwhelmingly loathes and resents the cluster hiring plan.... It threatens to inflict damage to academic programs on this campus that may take literally decades to undo – if it can be undone." At the November 29 town hall meeting, faculty complained that new hires had been brought in without sufficient investment in infrastructure, leading to a serious shortage of office and laboratory space and a strain on existing facilities. As a result of these criticisms, Wilcox was forced to declare an immediate moratorium on any major new initiatives at UC Riverside.
