= S. Jack Hu =

Chinese-American engineer

- 胡仕新

10th Chancellor of the University of California, Riverside
- Incumbent
- Assumed office July 15, 2025
- Preceded by: Kim A. Wilcox

Provost of the University of Georgia
- In office July 1, 2019 – June 29, 2025
- Preceded by: Pamela Whitten
- Succeeded by: Benjamin C. Ayers

Vice President for Research at the University of Michigan
- In office December 2015 – July 2019

Personal details
- Born: Hu Shixin; November 1963 (age 62) Changde, Hunan, China
- Citizenship: United States
- Education: Tianjin University (BE, ME); University of Michigan (MS, PhD)
- Website: chancellor.ucr.edu
- Scientific career
- Fields: Mechanical engineering
- Workplaces: University of Michigan; University of Georgia; University of California, Riverside
- Thesis: Impact of 100% measurement data on statistical process control (SPC) in automobile body assembly (1990)
- Doctoral advisor: Shien-Ming (Sam) Wu

Shixin Jack Hu (Chinese: 胡仕新; pinyin: Hú Shìxīn; born November 1963) is a Chinese-American mechanical engineer who has been serving as the 10th chancellor of the University of California, Riverside since July 15, 2025.

Hu studied engineering machinery at Tianjin University in China, receiving a bachelor's degree in 1983 and a master's degree in 1984. He studied mechanical engineering at the University of Michigan College of Engineering, receiving a master's degree and a PhD degree in 1990. After his graduation, he continued his research at the University of Michigan, joined the university faculty in 1995, and received tenure in 1998. He served as vice president for research at the University of Michigan from December 2015 to July 2019 and as provost of the University of Georgia from July 2019 to July 2025.

Hu's research focuses on manufacturing systems, assembly modeling, and statistical quality control. Hu is a member of the National Academy of Engineering and serves as a member of the executive committee of the Transportation Research Board of the National Academies. Hu is a Fellow of the American Society of Mechanical Engineers, the Chinese Academy of Engineering, the Society of Manufacturing Engineers, and the International Academy for Production Engineering.

== Early life and education ==
Hu was born in the city of Changde, Hunan province, China.

Hu studied engineering machinery at Tianjin University in China, receiving a Bachelor of Engineering in July 1983 and a Master of Engineering in December 1984.

After that, he pursued graduate studies in mechanical engineering at the University of Michigan, receiving a Master of Science and a Doctor of Philosophy in 1990. His doctoral dissertation was titled Impact of 100% measurement data on statistical process control (SPC) in automobile body assembly. His doctoral advisor was Shien-Ming (Sam) Wu.

== Career ==
=== University of Michigan ===
After finishing his PhD, Hu stayed at the University of Michigan as an eight-month postdoctoral research fellow from January 1991 to August 1991, and then as an assistant research scientist from September 1991 to August 1995. During this period, Hu led the "ATP 2mm Project".

After joining the university faculty as an assistant professor in 1995, he was promoted to associate professor with tenure in 1998 and named professor in 2002. From 2002 to 2006, Hu was director of the program in manufacturing and the executive director of Michigan interdisciplinary and professional engineering. He also worked on President Barack Obama's Advanced Manufacturing Partnership, a working group advising the federal government on how to bolster American manufacturing. He was named vice president for research in 2015 after serving in that position in an interim capacity. As vice president for research, he led the development of Mcity, a public-private partnership focused on connected and automated transportation, and a campus-wide initiative on data science.

As the vice president for research (2014–2019) at the University of Michigan, Hu had overall responsibility for nurturing the excellence and integrity of research across the University of Michigan campuses in Ann Arbor, Dearborn and Flint. The University of Michigan has an annual research expenditure of over $1.5 billion. The office of the vice president for research promotes interdisciplinary research, develops and implements research policy, provides central administrative services in support of faculty research, innovation, and economic outreach, and manages activities related to research compliance and the responsible conduct of research.

Hu was elected as a member into the National Academy of Engineering in 2015 for methods for predicting and diagnosing root causes of product quality variation in multistage assembly systems.

=== University of Georgia ===
On July 1, 2019, he began his tenure as senior vice president for academic affairs and provost at the University of Georgia.

As the senior vice president for academic affairs and provost at the University of Georgia (2019–2025), Hu oversees instruction, research, public service and outreach, and information technology. The vice presidents of these four areas report to him, as do the deans of UGA's 17 schools and colleges and the campus dean of the Augusta University/UGA Medical Partnership. The vice provost for academic affairs and the vice provost for diversity and inclusion and strategic university initiatives, as well as associate provosts for academic fiscal affairs, academic programs, faculty affairs, global engagement, the honors program, and the libraries, also report to him.

=== University of California, Riverside ===
On May 28, 2025, Hu was named the incoming 10th chancellor of the University of California, Riverside. He assumed the chancellorship on July 15, 2025.

== Honors and awards ==
- Fellow of the Society of Manufacturing Engineers (2018)
- Foreign Member of Chinese Academy of Engineering (2017)
- ASME Blackall Machine Tool & Gage Award (2017)
- SME Gold Medal (2017)
- Elected a member of the U.S. National Academy of Engineering (2015)
- SME/NAMRI S. M. Wu Research Implementation Award (2014)
- ASME William T. Ennor Manufacturing Technology Award (2012)
- Fellow of International Academy for Production Engineering (CIRP) (2012)
- Selected as a Big 10 Academic Alliance fellow of Academic Leadership Programs (2010)
- G. Lawton and Louise G. Johnson Professor of Engineering
- Fellow of American Society of Mechanical Engineers (2003)
- National Science Foundation CAREER Award (1996)
- Outstanding Young Manufacturing Engineer Award, Society of Manufacturing Engineers (1993)
- Various Best Paper Awards
