= Randallstown High School =

Coordinates: 39.382745°N 76.796021°W

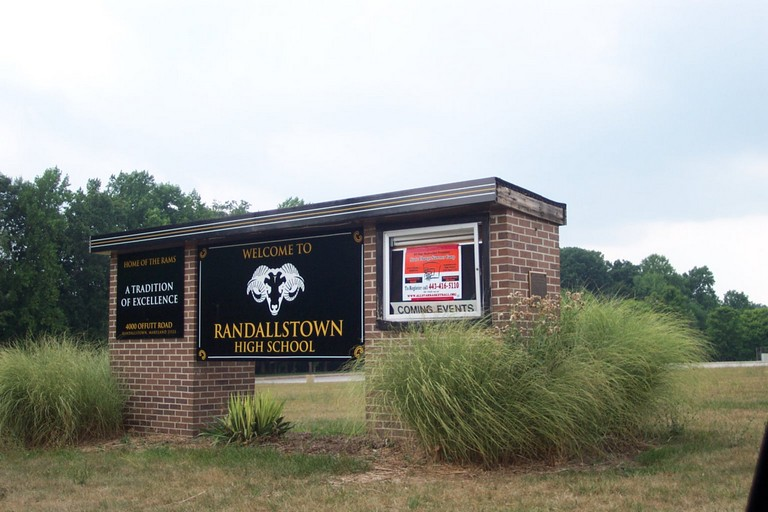
- 4000 Offutt Road; Randallstown, Maryland 21133; United States

Information
- Type: Public
- Established: 1969
- School district: Baltimore County Public Schools
- Principal: Micheal Jones
- Faculty: 65.1 (FTE)
- Enrollment: 1,048 (2019–20)
- Colors: Black and gold
- Mascot: Ram
- Newspaper: The Rams Horn
- Website: randallstownhs.bcps.org

Randallstown High School is a public high school located in Baltimore County, Maryland, United States. It serves students in the Randallstown and Owings Mills areas. It is a part of Baltimore County Public Schools. Its primary feeder schools are Deer Park Middle Magnet School, Sudbrook Magnet Middle School, Southwest Academy Middle School, Windsor Mill Middle School and Northwest Academy of Health Sciences.

== Academics ==
Randallstown High school received a 43.9 out of a possible 90 points (48%) on the 2018-2019 Maryland State Department of Education Report Card and received a 3 out of 5 star rating, ranking in the 26th percentile among all Maryland schools. Randallstown High School is home of 2 magnet programs, Academy of Health Professions & Multimedia Production.

== Students ==
The 2022–2023 enrollment at Randallstown High School was 1,159 students.

== Athletics ==
=== State championships ===
Football

- Class AA 1984
- 4A 1990

Boys Basketball

- Class A 1995
- 3A 2001, 2005
- 2A 2006, 2007

Baseball

- Class AA 1985

== Notable alumni ==
- Mitch Allan - singer/songwriter
- Brian Bark - former Major League Baseball player, current Chief Information Officer for Sinclair Broadcast Group
- Christian Benford - professional football player, cornerback for the Buffalo Bills
- D. J. Bryant - professional football player
- James P. Clements - President of Clemson University, former president of West Virginia University
- Marcus Cousin - professional basketball player
- Jae Deal - composer and music producer
- Khia Edgerton - Baltimore Club DJ, MC
- Kim English - former professional basketball player and current head basketball coach for Providence College
- Steven Oken - Convicted murderer executed in Maryland

== Shooting ==
On May 7, 2004, Randallstown High School was the scene of a school shooting. At approximately 4:30pm after an annual basketball game between students, faculty, and Maryland State Delegates, a Randallstown student along with 3 of his friends began shooting in the front of the school grounds. Four students were wounded including William "Tippa" Thomas who suffered paralysis.
