= James P. Clements =

American computer scientist and academic administrator

James Patrick Clements
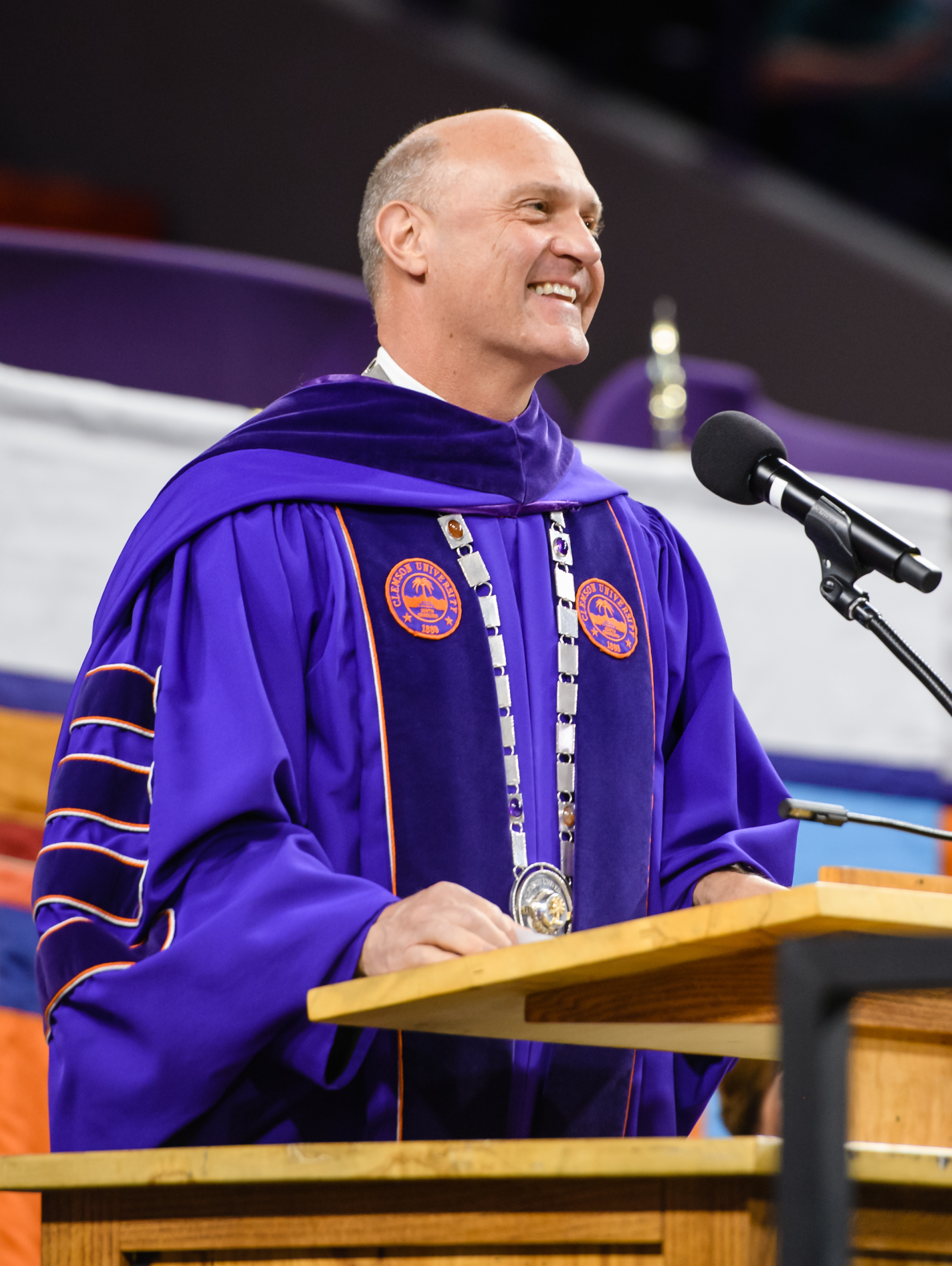
- Clements in 2018

15th President of Clemson University
- In office December 31, 2013 – December 31, 2025
- Preceded by: James Frazier Barker
- Succeeded by: Benjamin C. Ayers

23rd President of the West Virginia University
- In office June 30, 2009 – December 30, 2013
- Preceded by: C. Peter Magrath
- Succeeded by: E. Gordon Gee

Personal details
- Born: March 11, 1964 (age 62) Arlington County, Virginia, U.S.
- Education: University of Maryland, Baltimore County (BS, MS, PhD); Johns Hopkins University (MS)
- Profession: Educator

Academic background
- Thesis: An investigation of the effectiveness of information systems on the creative aspects of managerial decision-making (1993)
- Doctoral advisor: Guisseppi A. Forgionne

Academic work
- Discipline: Computer Science
- Institutions: Towson University; West Virginia University; Clemson University

James Patrick Clements (born March 11, 1964) is an American academic administrator who served as the 15th president of Clemson University in Clemson, South Carolina. He assumed office on December 31, 2013, after serving as the president of West Virginia University for five years and as the provost and vice president of academic affairs for Towson University.

== Early life ==
Clements is a graduate of Randallstown High School in Randallstown, Maryland. He earned a B.S. in computer science from the University of Maryland, Baltimore County in 1985 and an M.S. in computer science from Johns Hopkins University in 1988. He then returned to UMBC where he earned an M.S. in 1991 and Ph.D. in 1993, both in operations analysis.

== Career ==
Clements joined the faculty of Towson University in 1989, where he taught in the Department of Computer and Information Sciences. He was department chair of the department from 1998 to 1999. In 2002, he was named the Robert W. Deutsch Distinguished Professor of Information Technology. From 2004 to 2007, he was the university's vice president for economic and community outreach. Clements then served as provost and vice president of academic affairs from 2007 to 2009.

== President of West Virginia University ==
Clements was president of West Virginia University from 2009 to 2013. During his presidency, WVU set many records in private fundraising, research funding, applications and enrollment. WVU grew and developed under Clements through partnerships; he initiated nearly $1 billion worth of construction projects around campus.

== President of Clemson University ==
Clements became the 15th president of Clemson University on December 31, 2013. In addition to his responsibilities as president of the university, he holds a joint appointment as professor in the School of Computing and professor in the Department of Industrial Engineering.

In addition to his role as president, Clements was chair of the board of directors for the Association of Public and Land-grant Universities (APLU) in 2015. He also served as chair of the American Council on Education (ACE) Commission on Leadership; co-chaired the U.S. Department of Commerce's National Advisory Council on Innovation and Entrepreneurship; and served on the executive committee of the APLU's Commission on Innovation, Competitiveness and Economic Prosperity. He also serves on the ACE board and the Executive Committee for both the Council on Competitiveness and the Board for the Business Higher Education Forum.

Clements has written a book, Successful Project Management.

== Personal life ==
Clements married his wife, Elisabeth Smith Clements, on December 29, 1990. Dr. Clements and Beth have four children.

Their daughter Grace has apraxia, a neurological speech disorder. In 2010 Beth Clements’ parents, Clifton and Priscilla Smith, donated $25,000 to West Virginia University in their granddaughter's name for research, they established the Grace Clements Speech Pathology and Audiology Research Endowment. At Clemson, Beth is a member of the advisory board for ClemsonLIFE, a program designed to help young adults with special needs. In 2015, the Clemson Board of Visitors established the Grace Clements Scholarship Endowment to provide financial assistance to ClemsonLIFE students. Clements and Beth contributed $100,000 to the endowment named for their youngest daughter.

== See also ==
- List of presidents of West Virginia University
