= D. J. Bryant =

American gridiron football player (born 1989)

D.J. Bryant
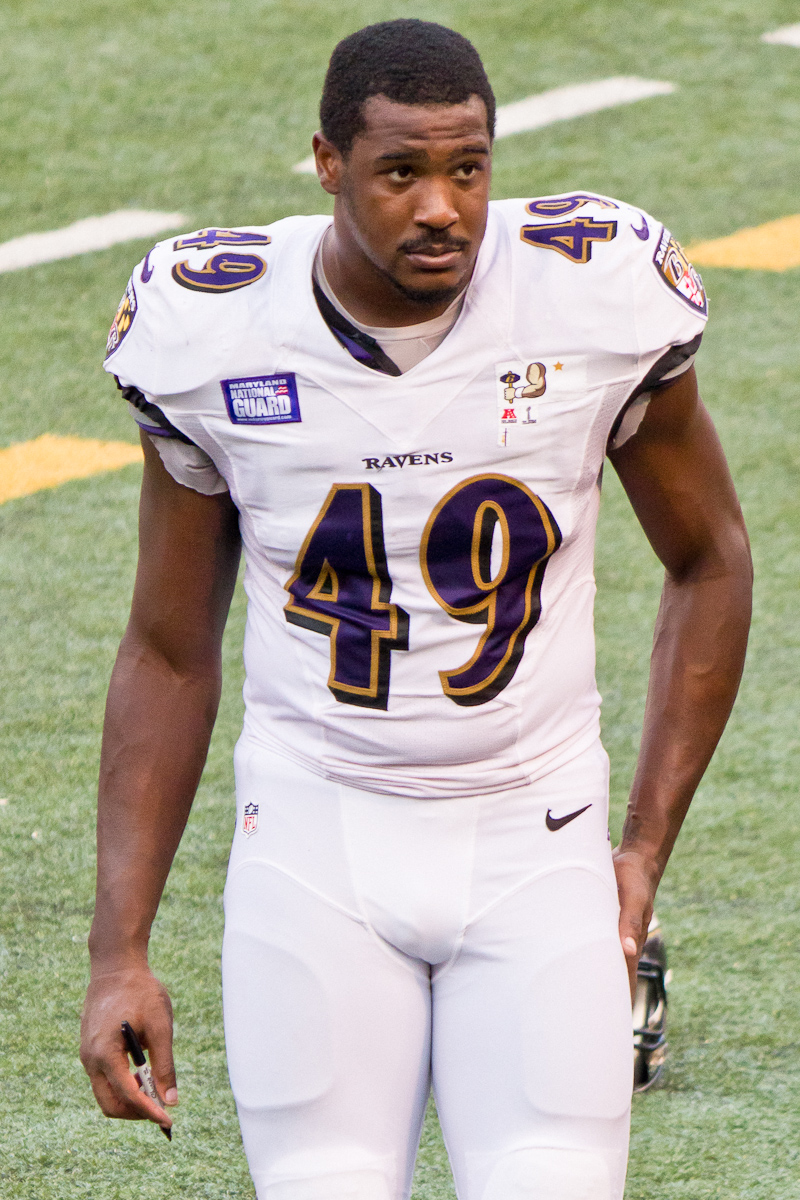
- Bryant at Ravens M&T Bank Stadium practice in August 2013

No. 63, 98, 59, 49, 56
- Position: Defensive end

Personal information
- Born: March 3, 1989 (age 37); Baltimore, Maryland, U.S.
- Listed height: 6 ft 3 in (1.91 m)
- Listed weight: 250 lb (113 kg)

Career information
- College: James Madison
- NFL draft: 2012: undrafted

Career history
- Houston Texans (2012)*; Tampa Bay Buccaneers (2012)*; Indianapolis Colts (2012)*; New York Jets (2012)*; Baltimore Ravens (2012–2013); Edmonton Eskimos (2015)*
- * Offseason or practice squad member only

Awards and highlights
- Super Bowl champion (XLVII)
- Stats at Pro Football Reference

Darrell "D. J." Bryant (born March 3, 1989) is an American former football outside linebacker. He played college football at James Madison University.

== Early life ==
He attended Randallstown High School in Randallstown, Maryland. He was Most Valuable Player of the Baltimore City-County All-Star game. He also was a two-time All-County defensive end and wide receiver at Randallstown High School.

== College career ==
He was selected to the preseason Second-team All-CAA by Phil Steele in his sophomore season. In his Senior season, he was named First-team All-CAA as a defensive lineman.

== Professional career ==
=== Houston Texans ===
On April 29, 2012, he signed with Houston Texans as an undrafted free agent. On August 31, 2012, he was released by the Texans.

=== Tampa Bay Buccaneers ===
On September 18, 2012, he signed with the Tampa Bay Buccaneers to join the practice squad.

=== Indianapolis Colts ===
On October 9, 2012, he signed with the Indianapolis Colts to join their practice squad.

=== New York Jets ===
On November 5, 2012, he signed with the New York Jets to join their practice squad. On December 4, 2012, he was released from the practice squad.

=== Baltimore Ravens ===
On December 13, 2012, he signed with the Baltimore Ravens to join their practice squad. On December 19, he was released from the practice squad. On December 26, he was re-signed to join the practice squad.
