= Henry Simms Hartzog =

American academic and school administrator (1866–1953)

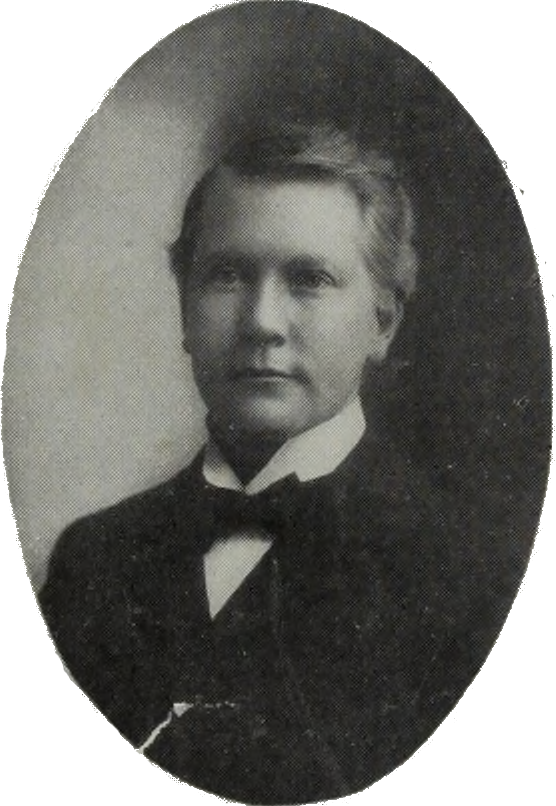
- Hartzog in 1901

3rd President of Clemson University
- In office 1897–1902
- Preceded by: Edwin Boone Craighead; Mark Bernard Hardin (interim)
- Succeeded by: Mark Bernard Hardin (interim); Patrick Hues Mell

8th President of the University of Arkansas
- In office 1902–1905
- Preceded by: John L. Buchanan
- Succeeded by: John N. Tillman

2nd President of Ouachita Baptist College
- In office 1907–1911
- Preceded by: John William Conger
- Succeeded by: Robert G. Bowers

Personal details
- Born: July 17, 1866 Bamberg County, South Carolina, U.S.
- Died: December 15, 1953 (aged 87) St. Louis, Missouri, U.S.
- Education: The Citadel (B.S. 1886); Southern Baptist Theological Seminary (B.Div. 1889)

Henry Simms Hartzog (July 17, 1866 – December 15, 1953) was an American academic and school administrator who served as the president of Clemson University, the University of Arkansas, and Ouachita Baptist University.

== Early life and career ==
Hartzog was born in 1866 to a family of prosperous planters in Bamberg County, South Carolina. He attended a private high school in Bamberg, and entered the South Carolina Military Academy (later renamed The Citadel) in 1882. Hartzog graduated with a degree in mathematics and civil engineering in 1886, and returned home to teach school. He became principal of Allendale High School before attending Southern Baptist Theological Seminary in Louisville, Kentucky, then resumed teaching in Bamberg. Hartzog began publishing a newspaper, the Bamberg Herald, in 1891. In 1895, he became superintendent of the Johnston Institute in Edgefield County.

== Clemson ==
After the sudden resignation of Edwin Boone Craighead, the trustees of Clemson College began a search for a new president. Clemson trustee and U. S. Senator Benjamin Tillman lived only 5 miles (8.0 km) from Johnston, and was interested in Hartzog's background in agriculture, military, engineering, as well as his experience in South Carolina's secondary schools. Hartzog was offered and accepted the job in September 1897.

Hartzog's first order of business was to improve the sanitary conditions on campus, after an outbreak of typhoid and malaria the previous summer. Improvements were made to the drinking water supply and campus dairy, and Hartzog changed the academic calendar to move the long break from winter to summer. In the fall of 1898 Clemson opened the first textile school in the South, tapping into a growing industry in upstate South Carolina.

Enrollment continued to rise, from 337 students in 1897 to 483 by 1901, with Hartzog reporting to the trustees that 300 further applicants were rejected for lack of space. Trustees authorized the construction of a new dormitory, and expansions of the chemistry and mechanical engineering buildings. In 1900, engineering professor (and future university president) Walter Riggs, who had coached Clemson's first football team convinced Hartzog to allow the formation of an athletic booster club. The club's funds were used to hire the school's first professional coach, John Heisman.

=== Cadet walkout ===
In early 1902, a sophomore cadet was charged with taking a test tube from the chemistry lab's supply closet to his work station without the permission of professor Richard Brackett. The faculty voted to suspend the cadet (though notably Brackett and fellow chemistry professor Mark Hardin voted against the suspension), and upheld the suspension after a petition from his classmates to reconsider the decision. The students asked Hartzog to take their case to trustee president Richard Simpson in nearby Pendleton, but Hartzog refused. The following day, sixty-nine of the seventy-four sophomores left campus in protest, with the other classes preparing to leave as well. Simpson and the trustees agreed to hear the case, reversing the cadet's suspension and declining to punish the students who walked out. Having lost the trust of the students and his faith in the trustees, Hartzog resigned from Clemson in June 1902.

== Arkansas ==
Hartzog became president of the University of Arkansas in 1902. During his tenure, he secured funding for seven new buildings and increased enrollment. In 1905 Governor Jeff Davis replaced Hartzog with his hand-picked candidate, John N. Tillman, in an effort to broaden his power before a run for the United States Senate.

== Ouachita Baptist ==
Hartzog served as president of Ouachita Baptist College from 1907 until 1911.

== Post-presidency ==
After leaving Ouachita Baptist, Hartzog published textbooks and grade school workbooks. He died on December 15, 1953, in St. Louis, Missouri.
