= Ivester School of Nursing =

Public nursing school in Athens, Georgia, US

Victoria Kay Ivester School of Nursing
- Type: Public nursing school
- Established: 2025; 1 year ago
- Parent institution: University of Georgia
- Dean: Carolyn K. Clevenger
- Location: Athens, Georgia, U.S. 33.9637°N 83.40362°W
- Website: nursing.uga.edu

The Victoria Kay Ivester School of Nursing is a public nursing school within the University of Georgia (UGA), located in Athens, Georgia, United States.

The University System of Georgia Board of Regents authorized the school's establishment in May 2025, and the first class is expected to enroll in fall 2027. Carolyn K. Clevenger is the school's founding dean. She was previously a professor and associate dean at the Nell Hodgson Woodruff School of Nursing. On April 17, 2026, the school was named in honor of Victoria Kay Ivester following a $20.5 million endowment from Melvin Douglas Ivester and the Ivester Foundation.
