= Edwin Boone Craighead =

American university administrator

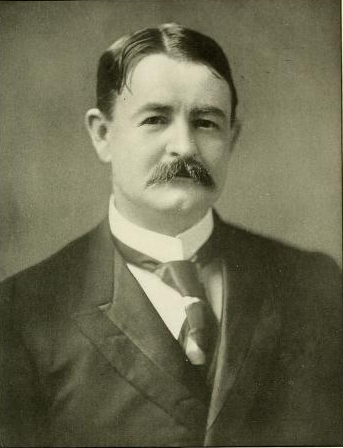
- Craighead in 1905

2nd President of Clemson University
- In office 1893–1897
- Preceded by: Henry Aubrey Strode
- Succeeded by: Mark Bernard Hardin (interim); Henry Simms Hartzog

12th President of Central College
- In office 1897–1901
- Preceded by: Tyson S. Dines
- Succeeded by: T. Berry Smith (acting); James C. Morris

5th President of the Missouri Normal School No. 2
- In office 1901–1904
- Preceded by: George H. Howe
- Succeeded by: James E. Ament

8th President of Tulane University
- In office 1904–1912
- Preceded by: Edwin Alderman
- Succeeded by: Robert Sharp

3rd President of the University of Montana
- In office 1912–1915
- Preceded by: Clyde Augustus Duniway
- Succeeded by: Frederick C. Scheuch (interim); Edward O. Sisson

Personal details
- Born: March 3, 1861 Hams Prairie, Missouri, U.S.
- Died: October 22, 1920 (aged 59) Missoula, Montana, U.S.
- Education: Central College (B.A., 1883)

Edwin Boone Craighead (March 3, 1861 – October 22, 1920) was an American academic and school administrator who served as the president of Clemson University, Central College, the University of Central Missouri, Tulane University, and the University of Montana.

== Early life and career ==
Craighead was born in Hams Prairie, Missouri, in 1861. His father died at a young age, leaving him to help his mother run the family farm. He attended Central College, where he excelled in languages. He briefly taught school in Neosho, Missouri, before studying at Vanderbilt University, and in Leipzig and Paris. Returning to the U.S., he taught languages at Emory and Henry College and Wofford College.

== University President ==
=== Clemson ===
In 1893, following the resignation of Henry Aubrey Strode, the trustees of Clemson College started a search for a new president. With his background in farming, and despite his humanities background and lack of administrative experience, the trustees selected Craighead, who moved to Clemson in June 1893, just before the first students arrived on campus.

Craighead was concerned with the low academic standards of the incoming students. Based on an entrance exam, Craighead and the faculty placed 165 of the 442 students into a hastily arranged preparatory class. The move drew opposition from state government officials, notably George Tillman, who saw Clemson's place as a vocational training institute, rather than a fully-fledged college. Craighead oversaw the continued development of the college and its services: a laundry, mess hall, infirmary, library, and student literary societies were all established in his first year.

Craighead was known as a loose-and-fast speaker, and after remarks criticizing Catholics and Jews in March 1894, was suspended for a month. Soon after his return, a fire destroyed the Main building. A wood-frame building was quickly built to house classes; the building would later serve as a hotel. In 1895, Craighead reorganized the school into five departments: agricultural, mechanical, chemical, academic, and military. The Experiment Station, under Clemson's purview, also received increased funding to expand programs and literature for the state's farmers.

Despite the extension program expansion, declining enrollment left Craighead's performance vulnerable to criticism, again led by George Tillman. Tillman charged that too much focus was being put onto liberal arts and military training, at the expense of the school's mission of agricultural and mechanical education. Governor John Gary Evans attacked the preparatory school as an unneeded expense, saying that Clemson should lower its standards to meet the state's high school graduates. Senator and trustee Benjamin Tillman came to Clemson's and Craighead's defense, saying that well-rounded graduates were key to the school's success. Further expansion of the extension program was soon announced, with offices to be placed in each county.

Craighead resigned from Clemson in June 1897, accepting the presidency of his alma mater, Central College in Missouri.

=== Other schools ===
Craighead was president of Central College (now Central Methodist University) from 1897 until 1901, Missouri Normal School No. 2 (now the University of Central Missouri) from 1901 until 1904, Tulane University from 1904 until 1912, and the University of Montana from 1912 until 1915.

== Post-presidency ==
After leaving the University of Montana, Craighead started a newspaper, the New Northwest in Missoula with his sons. He died of apoplexy in 1920 at age 59.

== Honors ==
Craighead was awarded honorary degrees from the University of Missouri (LL.D, 1898) and the University of the South (D.C.L., 1907). The Craighead/Sisson Apartments on Montana's campus are named for him.
