= Walter T. Cox Jr. =

American university administrator

Walter Thompson Cox Jr.
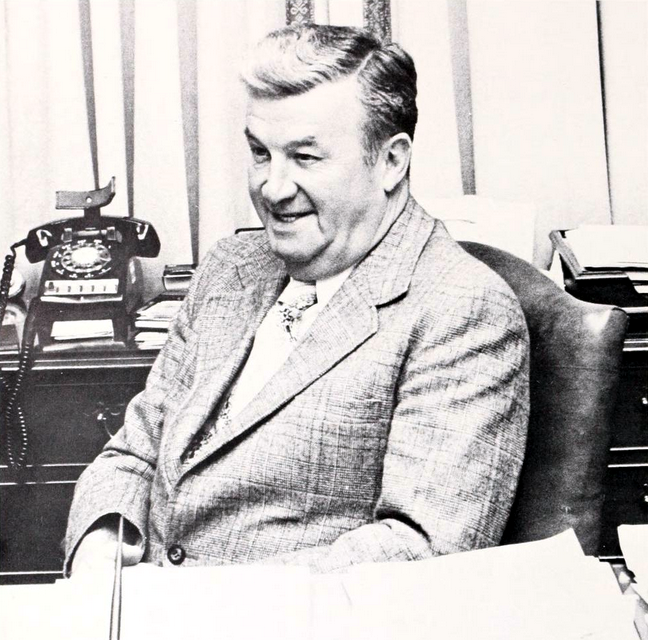
- Cox in 1977

10th President of Clemson University
- In office 1985–1986
- Preceded by: Bill Lee Atchley
- Succeeded by: A. Max Lennon

Personal details
- Born: September 19, 1918 Belton, South Carolina, U.S.
- Died: June 28, 2006 (aged 87) Greenville, South Carolina, U.S.
- Education: Clemson College (B.S., 1939)

Walter Thompson Cox Jr. (September 19, 1918 – June 28, 2006) was an American university administrator and coach who served as the 10th President of Clemson University.

== Early life and education ==
Cox was born in 1918 in Belton, South Carolina, about 25 miles (40 km) from Clemson. He enrolled at Clemson in 1935, and played guard on the football team. Upon graduating in 1939 with a degree in general science, Cox was convinced by coach Jess Neely to return to graduate school and play one more year of football.

== Career ==
Following the season, coach Neely left Clemson for Rice, and Cox considered taking an assistant position there. Ultimately, incoming coach Frank Howard offered Cox a position as assistant coach and athletics business manager. After serving in the United States Army in the Pacific Ocean theater of World War II in 1942 & 1943, Cox returned to Clemson, working with the Air Force Reserve Officers Training Corps training program before resuming his previous position in the athletic department. Cox served as head baseball coach in 1945 and from 1948 to 1951, notching a career record of 70–48–1 and leading the team to a Southern Conference regular season championship in 1951.

In 1951, president Robert Franklin Poole moved Cox to a new position as assistant to the president and director of alumni affairs. Following a 1955 re-organization, he was promoted to Dean (later known as vice-president) of student affairs. As dean, Cox was the administration's liaison to the students during the school's transition from an all-male military college to a co-ed university in 1955, and through the peaceful integration of the school in 1963.

== President of Clemson ==
In the 1980s, fallout from football recruiting and steroid scandals led to the resignation of president Bill Lee Atchley. Cox was named interim president by the board of trustees, effective July 1, 1985. His first actions as president were to officially place Atchely on sabbatical, and to remove Bill McLellan from his position as athletic director, in reaction to the athletic scandals. During Cox's presidency, the university broke ground on the Strom Thurmond Institute, conferred an honorary doctorate on Harvey Gantt, and implemented a plan to transfer a portion of athletic ticket revenue to academic scholarships.

Cox was replaced with Max Lennon on March 1, 1986. He remained as assistant to the president, and retired the following year. He died in Greenville, South Carolina, on June 28, 2006.

== Family ==
Cox's son, Walter T. Cox III, served as a judge on the United States Court of Appeals for the Armed Forces.

== Works cited ==
- Wunder, John R. (1998). "A Good Sport: Walter Thompson Cox, 1985–1986". In McKale, Donald M.; Reel, Jr., Jerome V. (eds.). Tradition: A History of the Presidency of Clemson University (2nd ed.). Macon, Georgia: Mercer University Press. pp. 241–259. ISBN 9780865542969.
