= Phil Prince =

American businessman and university president

Philip Hunter Prince
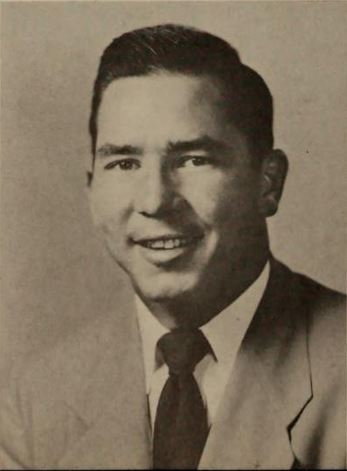
- Prince in 1949

12th President of Clemson University
- In office 1994–1995
- Preceded by: A. Max Lennon
- Succeeded by: Constantine W. Curris

Personal details
- Born: August 24, 1926 Bostic, North Carolina, U.S.
- Died: February 28, 2020 (aged 93) Greenville, South Carolina, U.S.
- Education: Clemson College (B.S.)

Philip Hunter Prince (August 4, 1926 – February 28, 2020) was an American businessman who served as the 12th President of Clemson University. He had been a student-athlete for the Clemson Tigers football team, and received the Clemson Distinguished Athletes Award in 2015.

== Early life ==
Prince was born in Bostic, North Carolina, in 1926 and was schooled in Erwin, Tennessee, before receiving, in 1944, an athletics scholarship to Clemson College. Prince was a letterman for four years in the Clemson football team in 1944 and 1946–48. His education was interrupted by serving in the US Army from 1944 to 1945 but on resuming his studies, he served as co-captain of the 1948 team that finished with an 11–0 record and #11 ranking in the final Associated Press poll and which won the 1949 Gator Bowl. Prince also was vice president of the 1949 senior class. After Clemson, he attended programs at Columbia University and King College, and after a brief stint with the New York Giants (NFL), he rejoined the army from 1950 to 1951.

== Business career ==
Beginning in 1951, Prince worked for Milliken & Company, becoming vice president in 1967. In 1978 he became a senior vice president at American Express, a position he held until 1983. After two years at a real estate company in Charlotte and as a textile manufacturing consultant, Prince retired from business.

== President of Clemson ==
Throughout his career, Prince maintained a connection to Clemson, serving on the board of visitors as well as various positions focusing on fundraising at the Clemson University Foundation, including president. In 1989 he was appointed as a life member of the board of trustees.

In February 1994, after the resignation of Max Lennon, Prince was named acting president of Clemson, until he was named president by the board on September 30, 1994. The board appointing one of its own members, and one with no advanced degrees or academic experience was not without controversy. The most consequential act of Prince's term was to consolidate the number of colleges from nine to four (later to become five), a process that had begun under Lennon's administration as a reaction to state budget cuts. Prince also moved the athletic director to report directly to the president, rather than the vice president for student affairs.

After an eleven-month tenure, Prince resigned in May 1995. He was recognized for his long-term commitment to the college by the receipt of an honorary Doctor of Humanities degree. He died at the age of 93 on February 28, 2020.

== Works cited ==
- Ulbrich, Holley L. (1998). "The Beloved Son: Philip Hunter Prince, 1994–1995". In McKale, Donald M.; Reel, Jr., Jerome V. (eds.). Tradition: A History of the Presidency of Clemson University (2nd ed.). Macon, Georgia: Mercer University Press. pp. 283–300. ISBN 9780865542969.
