= Constantine W. Curris =

American academic administrator

President of Murray State University
- In office 12 August 1973 – 8 January 1983
- Preceded by: Harry Sparks
- Succeeded by: Kala Stroup

President of the University of Northern Iowa
- In office 11 March 1983 – 31 May 1995
- Preceded by: Joseph Kamerick
- Succeeded by: Robert D. Koob

President of Clemson University
- In office 1 June 1995 – 10 November 1999
- Preceded by: Phillip Hunter Prince
- Succeeded by: James Frazier Barker

President of the American Association of State Colleges and Universities
- In office 20 November 1999 – 30 September 2008
- Preceded by: James B. Appleberry
- Succeeded by: Muriel A. Howard

Personal details
- Born: November 13, 1940 (age 85) Lexington, Kentucky, U.S.
- Spouse: Jo Hern Curris
- Children: Robert Alexander and Elena Diane
- Education: University of Kentucky, University of Illinois
- Profession: Academic Administrator

Constantine William "Deno" Curris (born November 13, 1940) is an American academic administrator who was president of Murray State University, the University of Northern Iowa, and Clemson University. Curris also served as president of the American Association of State Colleges and Universities, an organization of more than 400 colleges and universities.

== Early life and education ==
Curris was born in Lexington, Kentucky, on November 13, 1940, and graduated from the University of Kentucky in 1962 with a B.A. in political science. He obtained an M.A. in political science from the University of Illinois in 1965, and an Ed.D. in higher education from the University of Kentucky in 1967.

== Career ==
Curris began his work in higher education in 1965 as vice president and dean of the faculty at Midway College in Kentucky. In 1968 he became director of academic programs for the West Virginia Board of Education. From 1969 through 1971 he was dean of student personnel programs at Marshall University in West Virginia, and for the following two years was the vice president and dean of the faculty at the West Virginia Institute of Technology.

=== Murray State ===
In 1973, the 32-year-old Curris was selected as the president of Murray State University, a position he held until 1983. After Curris's contract was not continued at Murray State in 1983, he was hired as president of University of Northern Iowa. That same year, the Murray State University Board of Regents named the school's new student center after Curris.

=== Northern Iowa ===
Curris was president and professor of public policy at the University of Northern Iowa from 1983 to 1995. One of the buildings constructed at UNI during Curris's tenure was subsequently named the Curris Business Building by the Iowa State Board of Regents.

=== Clemson ===
From 1995 to 1999, he served as president and professor of public policy of Clemson University. He oversaw an ongoing reorganization of the university into five colleges and streamlining of administrative processes. He also increased funding for scholarships for high-performing students, and opened a new student center. Curris resigned from Clemson in 1999 after undergoing radiation therapy and surgery as treatment for cancer.

=== American Association of State Colleges and Universities ===
Curris' involvement with the American Association of State Colleges and Universities began during his presidency of Northern Iowa. He was named president of the American Association of State Colleges and Universities in 1999 and served until 2008. He has also been an occasional contributor to The Chronicle of Higher Education, including articles about the public purposes of public colleges, in support of a unit-record system of collecting student data, and about getting college students to the polls.

=== Boards and commissions ===
Other professional experiences for Curris include appointments to the 1998 Commission on the Future of the South, the Kellogg Commission on the Future of State and Land-Grant Universities, the Education Commission of the States, the Iowa Board of Economic Development, the South Carolina Research Authority, The Sigma Chi Foundation, and the chairmanships of American Humanics and the Iowa Task Force on Teacher Education and Certification.

== Retirement ==
Since his retirement from AASCU in 2008 Curris has been a consultant in academic searches. From 2009 to 2015 he was appointed to the Murray State University Board of Regents and served as chairman from 2010 to 2014.

Curris is married to Jo Hern Curris, a tax attorney. They live in Lexington, Kentucky, and are the parents of two adult children: Robert Alexander and Elena Diane.

== Awards and honors ==
Curris received the Alumni Achievement Award from the College of Arts and Science at the University of Illinois. He is a member of the University of Kentucky Arts & Sciences Hall of Fame, the University of Kentucky College of Education Hall of Fame, and he was inducted into the University of Kentucky Hall of Distinguished Alumni on May 19, 2000.
