= Max Lennon =

University President

Archie Max Lennon
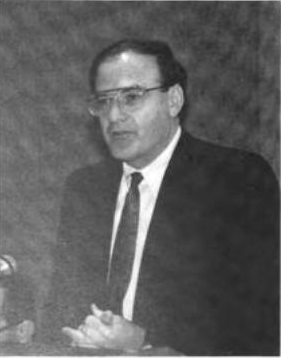

11th President of Clemson University
- In office 1986–1994
- Preceded by: Walter T. Cox Jr.
- Succeeded by: Phil Prince

4th President of Mars Hill College
- In office 1996–2002
- Preceded by: Fred Bentley
- Succeeded by: Dan Lunsford

Personal details
- Born: September 27, 1940 Columbus County, North Carolina, U.S.
- Died: November 29, 2016 (aged 76) Mars Hill, North Carolina, U.S.
- Education: Mars Hill College (A.S.); North Carolina State University (B.S., Ph.D.)
- Profession: Educator

Archie Max Lennon (September 27, 1940 – November 29, 2016) was an American academic who served as president of Clemson University from 1986–1994 and of Mars Hill College from 1996–2002.

== Early life and education ==
Lennon grew up on his family's farm in Columbus County, North Carolina. He attended the two-year Mars Hill College (as did his mother and some of his seven siblings), where he met his wife, Ruth. Lennon finished his bachelor's degree in animal science at North Carolina State University in 1962. After working on the family farm for several years, he returned to NC State and completed his doctorate in 1970.

== Early career ==
Lennon's first academic position after earning his doctorate was at Texas Tech University. He left in 1973 to take a position with Central Soya, where he was quickly promoted to research director. He later returned to Texas Tech as head of the animal science department, and was later named dean of research for the College of Agriculture. In 1980, Lennon became the chair of the animal husbandry department at the University of Missouri and six months later was appointed dean of the College of Agriculture. In 1983, he moved to the Ohio State University as vice president of agricultural administration and executive dean for agriculture, home economics, and natural resources.

== University president ==
After two years at Ohio State, Lennon was chosen as the 11th president of Clemson University in October 1985. He began his tenure by emphasizing transparency, research, and a focus on academics, after a string of athletic scandals had dominated university politics in the early 1980s. Lennon organized a strategic planning commission, which determined four major focus areas: undergraduate education, environmental resources, composite materials, and agricultural biotechnology. Budget cuts from the state hampered progress, leading Lennon and the trustees to rely increasingly on private donations. The resulting fundraising campaign far exceeded expectations, and led to the construction of a performing arts center, engineering laboratory, and dormitories, as well as increasing endowed faculty positions and scholarships.

Despite Lennon's successes, athletics threatened to steal focus once again. Recruiting violations led to the resignation and $1 million contract buyout of popular football coach Danny Ford in 1990. Fans never accepted new coach Ken Hatfield, who left the school in 1993 with a $600,000 buyout of his own. Though the buyouts came from athletic funds, the overall budget cuts led to increases in tuition and decreases in faculty raises, making the buyouts a scapegoat. The threat of a no-confidence vote by the faculty led Lennon to announce his resignation in February 1994, eventually stepping down in July 1994.

Lennon then became president and CEO of Eastern Foods, owned by Clemson alumnus and donor Robert H. Brooks. In 1996, he returned to Mars Hill and served as president for 6 years. After leaving Mars Hill, Lennon became president of the Education and Research Consortium of the Western Carolinas.

== Works cited ==
- Boykin, Jr., Joseph F. (1988). "The Visionary: A. Max Lennon, 1986–1994". In McKale, Donald M.; Reel, Jr., Jerome V. (eds.). Tradition: A History of the Presidency of Clemson University (2nd ed.). Macon, Georgia: Mercer University Press. pp. 262–282. ISBN 9780865542969.
