= James Frazier Barker =

President of Clemson University

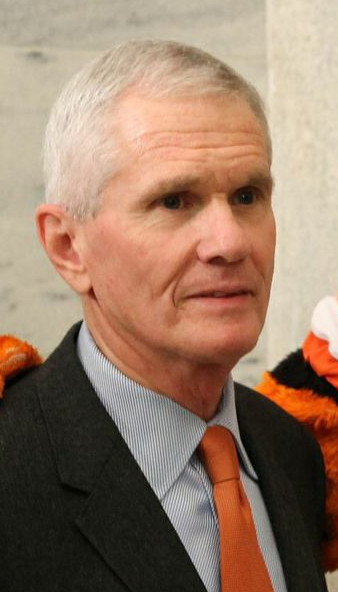
- Barker in 2013

14th President of Clemson University
- In office 11 November 1999 – 30 December 2013
- Preceded by: Constantine W. Curris
- Succeeded by: James P. Clements

Personal details
- Born: May 1, 1947 (age 79) Kingsport, Tennessee, U.S.
- Education: Clemson University (BA); Washington University in St. Louis (MA)
- Occupation: Administrator, Professor

Academic work
- Discipline: architecture
- Institutions: University of Tennessee; Mississippi State University; Clemson University

James Frazier Barker (born May 1, 1947) is the former president of Clemson University in Clemson, South Carolina.

== Early life and education ==
Barker was born in Kingsport, Tennessee and graduated from Dobyns-Bennett High School. He attended Clemson University and graduated with a degree in architecture in 1970. He then attended Washington University in St. Louis, earning a master's degree in architecture in 1973.

== Career ==
Following graduation, Barker was hired as an assistant professor of architecture at the University of Tennessee. In 1974, he moved to Mississippi State University. In 1984 he became dean of architecture at Mississippi State. Barker became dean of architecture at Clemson University in 1986, a position he held until his election as president in 1999.

== President of Clemson ==
Barker served as President of Clemson from 1999 to 2014. In his inaugural address, Barker stated a goal of having Clemson ranked in the Top 20 public universities, as ranked by U.S. News & World Report. During his tenure, Clemson's U.S. News ranking has risen from #38 to #22. Barker has overseen the creation of the Clemson University International Center for Automotive Research and the Restoration Institute in North Charleston (including a $98 million wind turbine research center).

Barker also has served as the chair of the NCAA Division I board of directors from 2007 until 2010, and commissioner (2002–2004) and chair (2004–2006) of the Southern Association of Colleges and Schools.

In January 2013, Barker underwent five heart bypass surgeries. On April 16, 2013, he announced plans to retire and return full-time to the classroom. James P. Clements replaced him as president on January 1, 2014.
