= Mark Bernard Hardin =

American academic

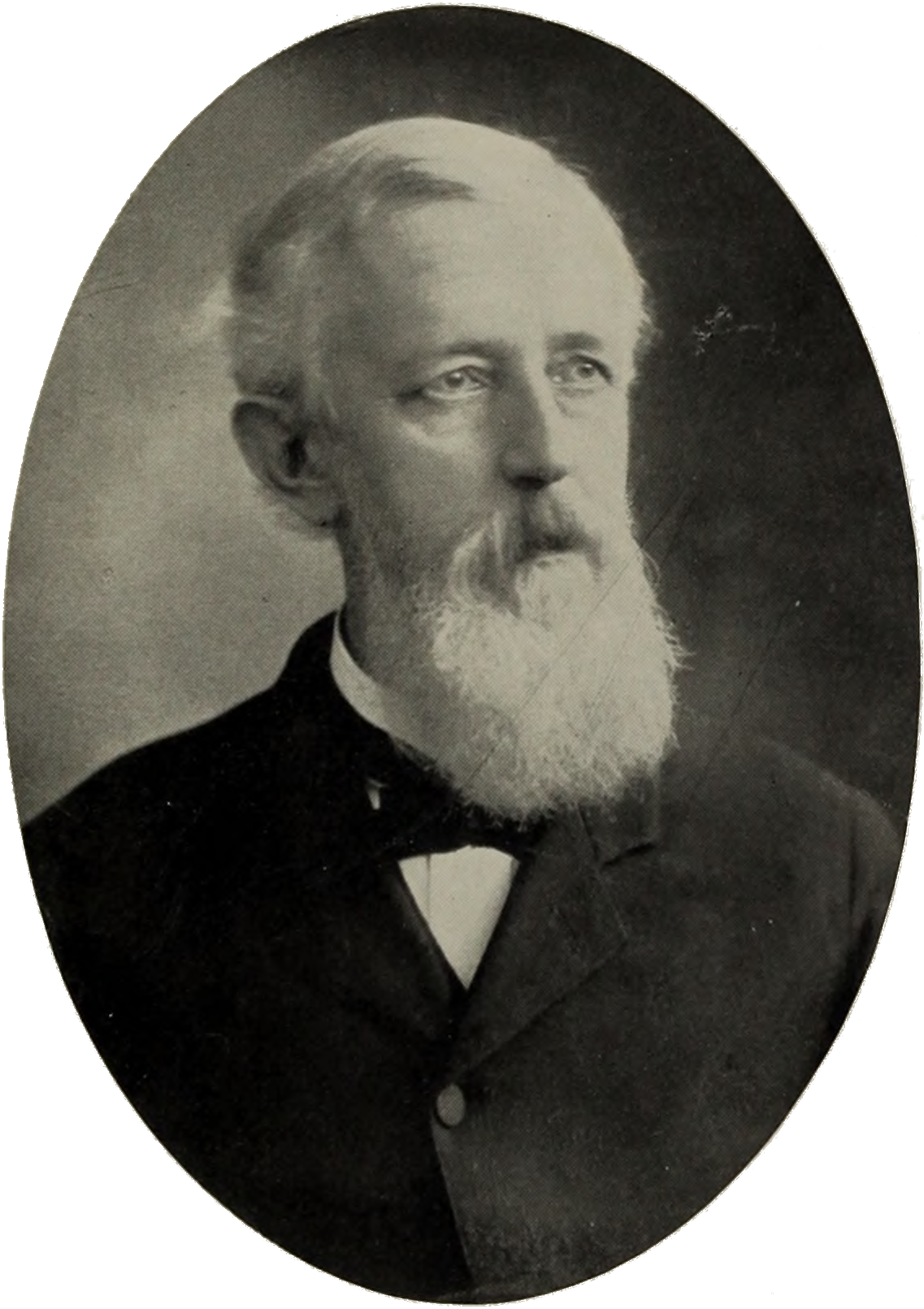
- Hardin in 1904
- Born: August 14, 1838; Alexandria, Virginia, U.S.
- Died: April 26, 1916 (aged 77); Clemson, South Carolina, U.S.
- Burial place: Old Stone Church Cemetery, Clemson, South Carolina
- Education: Virginia Military Institute (1858)
- Occupations: Chemist, Professor
- Known for: Acting President of Clemson College, 1897, 1899, 1902

Mark Bernard Hardin (1838-1916) was an American chemist and professor who served as acting president of Clemson College (now University) in 1897, 1899, and 1902.

Hardin was born in 1838 in Alexandria, Virginia. He studied science at the Virginia Military Institute, and remained there after graduation, becoming assistant commandant of cadets and an adjunct professor of chemistry, mineralogy, and geology. During the Civil War, he fought for the Confederate Army in the 33rd and 9th Virginia Infantries, and commanded the 18th Battalion, Virginia Heavy Artillery. From 1865 until 1877, he worked as an analytical chemist in New York City, before returning to VMI as a professor.

In 1890, Hardin was hired as chemist and professor at the newly founded Clemson College. Before students were enrolled in the school, his duties were to oversee the construction of the chemical laboratory, develop the chemistry curriculum, and inspect fertilizers as part of the college's extension system. Hardin was chosen as acting president of the college in 1897 following the resignation of Edwin Boone Craighead, serving for one month until Henry Simms Hartzog arrived on campus. He acted as president in 1899 during Hartzog's illness, and for a month in 1902 following Hartzog's resignation. He declined another stint as acting president following Patrick Hues Mell's administration in 1910, citing health concerns, instead supporting professor Walter Riggs as Mell's replacement.

Hardin retired in July 1910 and was named Professor Emeritus. He died on April 26, 1916. Clemson's original chemistry building (which now houses humanities) was named in his honor, and his home on campus has been maintained for use by visiting trustees.

== Works cited ==
- McKale, Donald (1998). "The Trusted Substitute: Mark Bernard Hardin, 1897, 1899, 1902". In McKale, Donald M.; Reel Jr., Jerome V. (eds.). Tradition: A History of the Presidency of Clemson University (2nd ed.). Macon, Georgia: Mercer University Press. pp. 69–77. ISBN 9780865542969.
