= Indigenous members of the Andrew Jackson household =

Andrew Jackson, the seventh president of the United States, and his wife Rachel Donelson Robards Jackson had no biological children together but served as guardians to a large number of children, several of whom lived at the Hermitage at one time or another. Many of these children were members of the extended Donelson family, others were the children of Jackson's friends. Andrew Jackson also sent home three male Native American babies or children, who were called Charley, Theodore, and Lyncoya, who were collected before and during the Creek War, a subconflict of the War of 1812 and the first of Jackson's decades-long military and political campaigns to ethnically cleanse the south for white settlers so that their black slaves could plant cotton, a highly profitable cash crop. Lyncoya has been described as having been "adopted" by the Jacksons but there are no known documents attesting to any form of legal adoption. This was also the case for "the only ward that he and Rachel considered to be a child of theirs," Andrew Jackson Jr. There are no judicial or legislative records any of these "adoptions" (contra many probate records designating Jackson as a legal guardian for surviving minor heirs), and statutory family law was essentially non-existent in early 1800s Tennessee.

Name	Lifetime	Notes
Theodore	c. 1813 – before March 1814	Muscogee, taken prisoner at Littafuchee, sent to live at the Hermitage as a companion for Andrew Jackson Jr.; Theodore died
Charley	fl. February–April 1814	Indigenous orphan, tribal affiliation unknown; he was given to Jackson and sent to live at the Hermitage as a companion to Andrew Jackson Donelson
Lyncoya Jackson	c. 1811 – July 1, 1828	Muscogee survivor of the Battle of Tallushatchee; died of tuberculosis at the age of sixteen

== Cross-cultural adoptions ==
In the 17th through 19th centuries, "Some Anglo-Americans, including Andrew Jackson, incorporated Indian war captives into their households, calling them kin." As per archeologist Elizabeth Prine Pauls in Encyclopedia Britannica, "From the beginning of the colonial period, Native American children were particularly vulnerable to removal by colonizers. Captured children might be sold into slavery, forced to become religious novitiates, made to perform labor, or adopted as family members by Euro-Americans; although some undoubtedly did well under their new circumstances, many suffered." Similarly, cross-cultural adoption of war captives took place in Indigenous communities, including both children from other tribes and Anglo-American babies and children.

== Jackson as father and Great Father ==
One analysis of Jackson's relationship with his numerous wards and foundlings characterizes his "preoccupation with acquiring dependents" as necessary to an internal and external construction of "Jackson's mastery as a white male." Scholars have speculated on Jackson's political and psychological motives from bringing Indigenous children into his home, but the only testimony in his letters suggests that he identified with their orphanhood, as he had lost his entire surviving family (mother and two brothers) during the American Revolutionary War. Historian Lorman Ratner described Jackson as a boy without a father, and a man without sons, which may have motivated him to accept guardianship of dozens of young people who lived with him at various times or whom he assisted legally, financially, or socially.

Jackson's motives in adopting Theodore, Charley, and Lyncoya were likely complex. He repeatedly described Muscogee people as savage and barbaric "wretches" but simultaneously Jackson was socially and politically required to take a paternalistic tone when dealing with non-whites: "Jackson's claims to Indian territories and enslaved people of African descent revolved around the assumption that anyone who was not white and male needed the paternal oversight of Southern white men such as himself." During the years 1815 to 1821, Jackson served as an Indian agent for the Five Civilized Tribes and in his speeches to those communities leaned heavily on Great White Father metaphors that infantilized the Indigenous, arguing that subordination of the helpless Indian child to the authoritarian white father was essential to the survival of the American national family. Around the time Charley was being transported to the Hermitage, Jackson made a speech at the Horseshoe Bend battlefield expressing his feelings about the fate of the Muscogee, stating, "The fiends of the Tallapoosa will no longer murder our Women and Children, or disturb the quiet of our borders...They have disappeared from the face of the Earth...How lamentable it is that the path to peace should lead through blood, and over the carcasses of the slain!! But it is in the dispensation of that providence, which inflicts partial evil to produce general good." Biographer Robert V. Remini summarized the conclusions of a book called Fathers and Children: Andrew Jackson and the Subjugation of the American Indian as "[Michael Paul Rogin] finds Jackson's relations with the Indians to involve deep psychological problems," but "while I feel there are many excellent insights into Jackson's character in this book, I do not accept its fundamental analysis of Jackson's motivation."

Individual tour guides at the Hermitage have used Jackson's "fostering of Lyncoya, Theodore, and Charley [to suggest] that he did not 'hate the Indians,' as visitors so often complained. This infused conceptions of color-blindness into the historic interpretation of racialized systems of oppression...which in itself undergirds white supremacy and protects whiteness...Some interpreters also raise the longstanding story that when Lyncoya's family was killed, the women in the village 'refused' to care for him and were going to leave him to die." Contemporary historians generally challenge the 19th-century interpretation of Jackson's actions toward Charley, Theodore, and Lyncoya as benevolent, finding instead that they were part of a pattern of insidious race-based cruelty. As historian Rebecca Onion put it: "Jackson killed Creek people, took Creek land, and raised their children as his own—a primal act of domination." In his 2019 Surviving Genocide: Native Nations and the United States from the American Revolution to Bleeding Kansas, historian Jeffrey Ostler wrote of the Creek War and the "rescue" of Lyncoya at Tallushatchee:

...Taking prisoners (rather than killing them) as well as feeding refugees (rather than letting them starve) also allowed Americans to make a war of extermination appear—to themselves and observers in the 'civilized' world—consistent with principles of Christian humanitarianism. No U.S. leader mastered the art of reconciling catastrophic destruction and paternalistic benevolence better than Andrew Jackson... In the same way that Jackson assumed the role of father to Lyncoya, while at the same time destroying his people, so did Americans think of themselves as good parents to their Indian children even as they declared the necessity of Native extinction.

== See also ==
- List of children of presidents of the United States § Andrew and Rachel Jackson

== Sources ==
- Barna, Elizabeth Kathryn (2020). Between Plantation, President, and Public: Institutionalized Polysemy and the Representation of Slavery, Genocide, and Democracy at Andrew Jackson's Hermitage (Thesis). Nashville, Tennessee: Vanderbilt University.
- Black, Jason Edward (July 2005). "Authoritarian Fatherhood: Andrew Jackson's Early Familial Lectures to America's "Red Children"". Journal of Family History. 30 (3): 247–264. doi:10.1177/0363199005276946. ISSN 0363-1990.
- Cheathem, Mark R. (2014). Andrew Jackson, Southerner. Baton Rouge, Louisiana: Louisiana State University Press. ISBN 978-0-8071-5099-3. LCCN 2012049695. OCLC 858995561. Project MUSE book 26506.
- Cheathem, Mark R. (2019). "The Stubborn Mythology of Andrew Jackson". Reviews in American History. 47 (3): 342–348. doi:10.1353/rah.2019.0062. ISSN 1080-6628.
- Gismondi, Melissa (2017-06-12). Rachel Jackson and the Search for Zion, 1760s–1830s (PhD, History thesis). Charlottesville, Virginia: University of Virginia. doi:10.18130/v3q364.
- Inman, Natalie R. (2017). Brothers and Friends: Kinship in Early America. Early American Spaces. Athens, Georgia: University of Georgia Press. doi:10.1353/book51901. ISBN 978-0-8203-5110-0. LCCN 2016055415. OCLC 985105661.
- Meredith, Rachel (May 2013). "There Was Somebody Always Dying and Leaving Jackson as Guardian": The Wards of Andrew Jackson (M.A. History thesis). Murfreesboro, Tennessee: Middle Tennessee State University. ProQuest 1538368.
- Nooe, F. Evan (2024). Aggression and Sufferings: Settler Violence, Native Resistance, and the Coalescence of the Old South. Indians and Southern History. Tuscaloosa: University of Alabama Press. ISBN 978-0-8173-2174-1.
- Ostler, Jeffrey (2019). Surviving Genocide: Native Nations and the United States from the American Revolution to Bleeding Kansas. New Haven, Connecticut: Yale University Press. doi:10.12987/9780300245264. ISBN 978-0-300-24526-4.
- Peterson, Dawn (2017). "5. Adoption in Andrew Jackson's Empire". Indians in the Family: Adoption and the Politics of Antebellum Expansion. Harvard University Press. doi:10.4159/9780674978720. ISBN 978-0-674-97872-0.
- Remini, Robert V. (1977). Andrew Jackson and the Course of American Empire, 1767–1821. New York: Harper & Row. ISBN 978-0-8018-5912-0. LCCN 77003766. OCLC 1145801830.
- Snyder, Christina (2017). "Andrew Jackson's Indian Son: Native Captives and American Empire". In Garrison, Tim Alan; O'Brien, Greg (eds.). The Native South: New Histories and Enduring Legacies. Lincoln, Nebraska: University of Nebraska Press. pp. 84–106. doi:10.2307/j.ctt1q1xq7h.9. ISBN 978-0-8032-9690-9. JSTOR j.ctt1q1xq7h.9.
- Various; Jackson, Andrew (1984). Moser, Harold D.; MacPherson, Sharon (eds.). The Papers of Andrew Jackson, Volume II, 1804–1813. Knoxville: University of Tennessee Press. ISBN 978-0-87049-441-3. LCCN 79015078. OCLC 5029597.
