= Lyncoya Jackson =

Creek Indian child adopted by Andrew Jackson

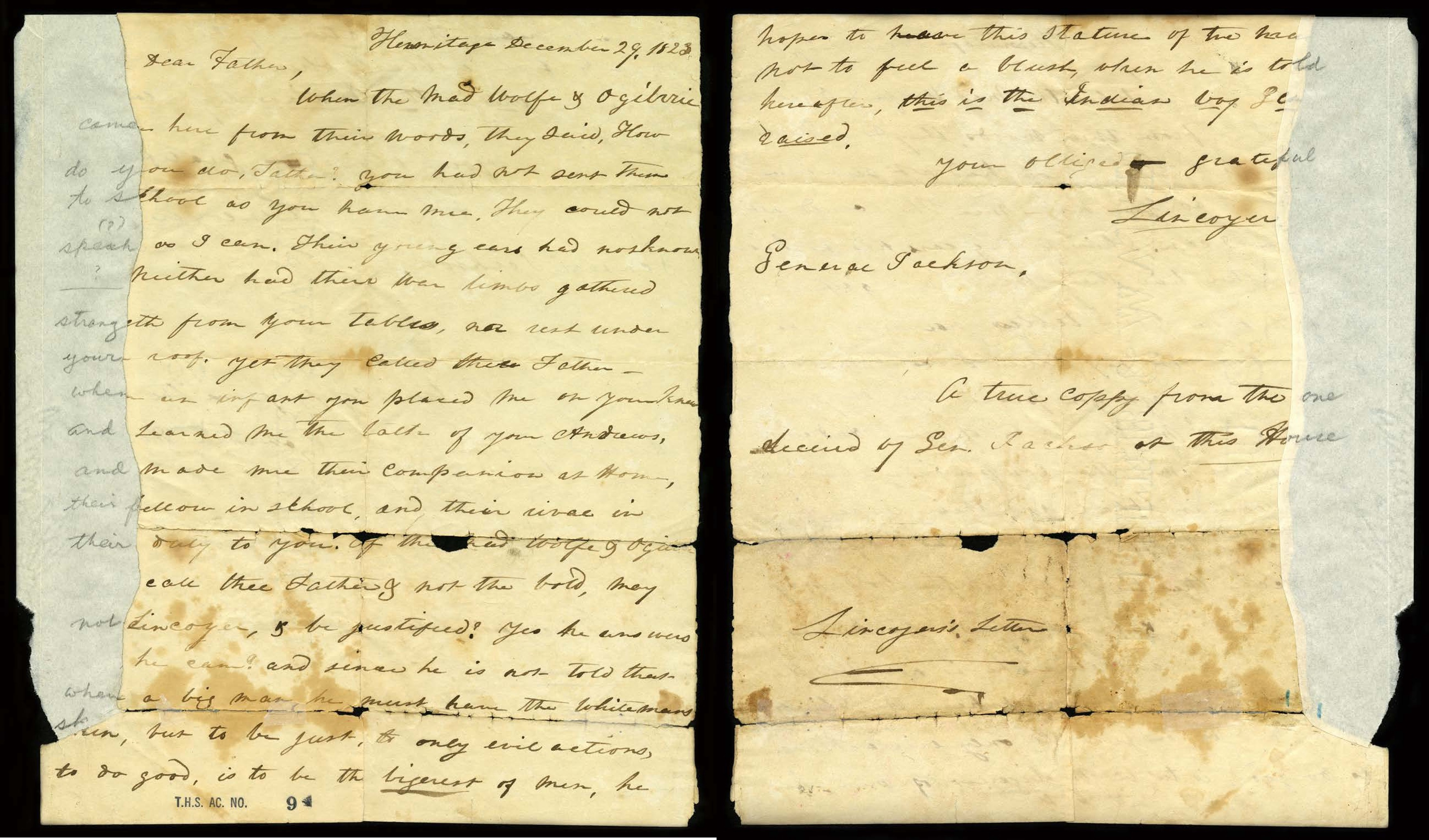
- Letter from Lincoya to Andrew Jackson, dated December 29, 1823
- Born: c. 1812; Alabama, U.S.
- Died: July 1, 1828 (aged 15–16); Nashville, Tennessee, U.S.
- Occupation: Saddler

Lyncoya Jackson (c. 1812 – July 1, 1828), also known as Lincoyer or Lincoya, was an Indigenous American from a family that was a part of the Upper Creek tribal-geographical grouping and more than likely affiliated with Red Stick political party. The family lived in the Muscogee tribal town at Tallasseehatchee Creek in present-day eastern Alabama. Lyncoya's parents were killed on November 3, 1813, by troops led by John Coffee at the Battle of Tallushatchee, an engagement of the Creek War and the larger War of 1812. Lyncoya survived the massacre and the burning of the settlement and was found lying on the ground next to the body of his dead mother. He was one of two Creek children from the village who were taken in by militiamen from Nashville, Tennessee. Lyncoya was the third of three Native American war orphans who were transported to Andrew Jackson's Hermitage in 1813–14. The other two, Theodore and Charley, died or disappeared shortly after their arrivals in Tennessee, but Lyncoya survived and was raised in the household of Tennessee militia commander Andrew Jackson, shortly to be commissioned a Major General in the United States Army.

Lyncoya was initially termed a "pett" for Jackson's white male wards. Jackson later included Lyncoya in the catalog of wards whom he considered to be his sons, inquiring about his health and educational progress in letters home to his wife Rachel. He was educated alongside Jackson's other wards in the local school, and at one time Jackson wanted Lyncoya to attend West Point, which he considered the most prestigious educational opportunity in the United States. Lyncoya was ultimately apprenticed to a saddler in Nashville. Lyncoya contracted a respiratory infection and returned home to the Hermitage in his sickness. Despite nursing and healthcare provided at the Hermitage, Lyncoya died of tuberculosis at approximately 16 years old. He was buried in an unmarked grave somewhere near the Hermitage within Davidson County.

As early as 1815, and certainly by 1824, Jackson's political allies framed Lyncoya's survival and presence in Jackson's household as a defense against charges that Jackson was a bloodthirsty killer of Indians. Lyncoya's obituary—published during the bitter 1828 U.S. presidential contest between Jackson and John Quincy Adams—also served as a form of political messaging. Jackson was presented as the hero of Lyncoya's story in 19th-century biographies of the seventh U.S. president, and his life continues to be used in the 21st century as a defense against charges that racial animus was the motive for Jackson's 25-year-long effort to ethnically cleanse the Old Southwest of Native Americans.

== Biography ==
=== Early life ===
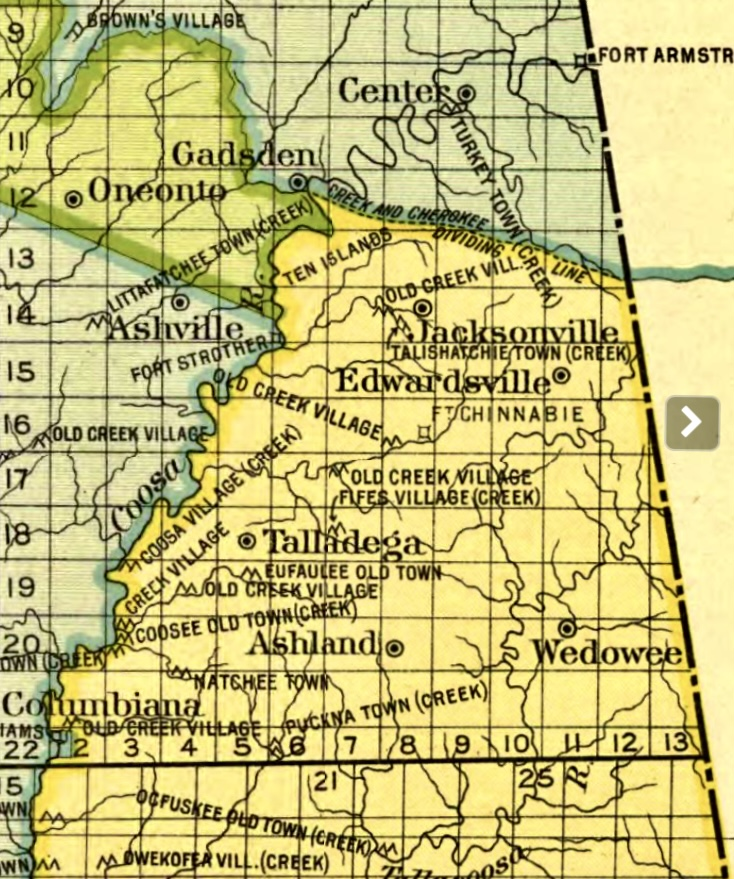
Excerpt from Alabama map in Indian Land Cessions in the United States (1898) showing "Talishatchie Town (Creek)" and "Old Creek Village"

Born to Muscogee (Creek) parents who were most likely associated with the Red Stick political faction, Lyncoya was said to be 10 or 12 months old when he was orphaned during the Creek War in the Battle of Tallushatchee on November 3, 1813. The placename Tallasseehatchee describes "the stream or creek near the old town," from the Muscogee language tvlv, "town," hasse, "old," and hvcce, "creek." (Note: There is a degree of uncertainty about the Old Town part, with some sources translating it as "former town," "deserted town," "taken town" or "captured town.")

Jackson's long-time business partner and nephew-by-marriage John Coffee led the action of Jackson's Tennessee militia and their Indigenous and mixed-race allies in the assault on the tribal town. During the battle, fires set by the Tennesseans burned residents alive in their cabins. The Red Stick death toll was 186. Another 84 were taken prisoner. The following day, American troops scavenged and found potatoes that had roasted in the heat of the burning town, while dogs scavenged the bodies of the dead Muscogee. John Walker Jr., a U.S. Army major of Cherokee heritage who had married the granddaughter of Indian agent Return J. Meigs, participated in the massacre, later "recalling that their 'situation looked dismal to see, Women & Children slaughtered with their fathers.'"

According to his obituary in the Nashville Republican, published the summer before the 1828 U.S. presidential election in which Jackson was a candidate, Lyncoya was "the son of a Chief." His name is not in the Muscogee language but an invention of the young white woman, Maria Pope (daughter of LeRoy Pope), who was initially charged with his care. An account published in Alabama in 1983 stated that Lyncoya means "abandoned one" in Muscogee, a claim promulgated by the 1953 Susan Hayward–Charlton Heston film The President's Lady. Lyncoya was brought to Jackson after the surviving women in the village refused to care for him because they were severely injured. Historian Kathryn E. Holland Braund wrote in her examination of Muscogee womanhood at the time of the Creek War that, "In his account, Richard Keith Call noted that Jackson, 'although a man of iron nerve, he was yet a girl in the softer feelings of his nature.' For Call, the 'incident...proved the woman like tenderness of [Jackson's] heart.' The image of Andrew Jackson and his officers nursing a baby with a sugar tit and puzzling over their young charge marks a sharp contrast to the horrific life-taking that produced the orphan." The actual work of sustaining Lyncoya with brown sugar and scavenged biscuit crumbs was delegated to an enslaved man named Charles. Charles was possibly the enslaved man described by the University of Tennessee's Papers of Andrew Jackson project as "Charles (c. 1795 – after 1855), in New Orleans with AJ in 1814, was AJ's military servant, 1817–19. He was the family carriage driver for many years and helped Dunwoody train the thoroughbreds."

In the 17th through 19th centuries, "Some Anglo-Americans, including Andrew Jackson, incorporated Indian war captives into their households, calling them kin." Lyncoya has been described as having been "adopted" by the Jacksons but there are no known documents attesting to any form of legal adoption. Lyncoya was one of two Muscogee children taken from the Tallushatchee battlefield. In 1833, during his presidency, Jackson replied to an inquiry from a Col. William Moore, writing, "Your letter of the 7th instant is just to hand—I hasten to reply, that Lyncoya, was the child found suckling his dead mothers breast after the battle of Tallahassee was over, & sent to me by Genl Coffee—The wounded child which you brought into camp, was the one taken, and roused by Doctor [John] Shelby—he cured him of his wounds & adopted him as a child, and educated him—he turned out badly as I believe, & ran away from the Doctor. The Doctor can give you his history." According to one account, the child taken to Nashville by Dr. Shelby was also named Lyncoya. Jackson's actions apparently served as a model for his troops, who "would 'steal' children, throughout the Creek War, sending them back home to serve as 'petts,' companions, slaves, following the example of their commander."

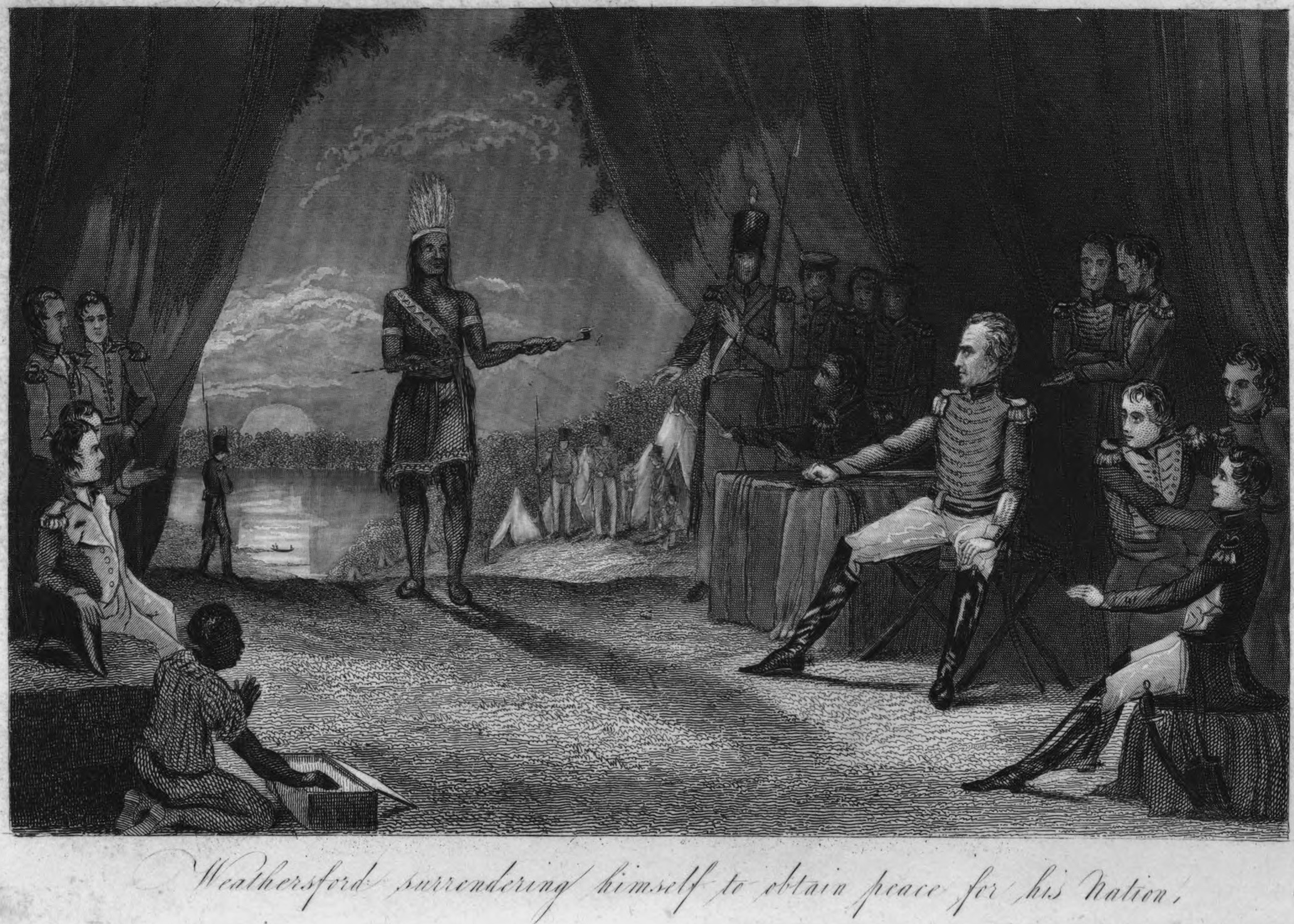
In this 1844 engraving from Amos Kendall's Life of Andrew Jackson, Red Stick leader William Weatherford surrenders to Jackson, ending the First Creek War; the African-American man kneeling in the bottom left of the image may represent Lyncoya's caregiver Charles

Lyncoya was brought to the Jackson home, the Hermitage, in 1814. He was the third of three Indigenous babies or children who was carried to Nashville at Jackson's behest, the others being Theodore, who died in the spring of 1814, and Charley, whose fate is uncertain. Lyncoya would have initially lived in what is called the Log Hermitage, and then in the mansion house, built in 1821. Rachel Jackson was charged with being Lyncoya's "primary caregiver," in part because that was the traditional gender role and in part Jackson traveled extensively for his work throughout the 1810s and 1820s, such that "Jackson depended on her to oversee Lyncoya's upbringing and prepare him for his exhibition to the nation's elite. Rachel did as best she could but considered Lyncoya a nuisance, imposed by Jackson to serve a national ambition, which she did not share. His arrival signaled a growing division between the pious and local life Rachel wanted and the national stage that Jackson had begun to thrust upon her. Rachel's neglect of Lyncoya also reflected her frustration and disappointment with Jackson." Rachel Jackson had a complicated emotional relationship with Indigenous America, dating back to her days a child passenger on her father's river expedition on the Adventure—the passengers and crew of one of the boats, left behind because of a smallpox outbreak, were made vulnerable by isolation and were slaughtered by hostile Chickamauga Cherokee.

=== Lyncoya in letters ===
The social-emotional world of the larger Hermitage community and a fleeting projection of Andrew Jackson's internal racial cosmology appears in a letter written to Rachel Jackson on September 18, 1816, from the "Chikesaw council house":

My Love I have this moment recd. your affectionate letter of the 8th. Instant, I rejoice that you are well & our little son. Tell him his sweet papa hears with pleasure that he has been a good boy & learns his Book, Tell him his sweet papa labours hard to get money to educate him, but when he learns & becomes a great man, his sweet papa will be amply rewarded for all his care, expence, & pains—how thankfull I am to you for taking poor little Lyncoya home & cloathing him—I have been much hurt to see him there with the negroes, like a lost sheep without a sheperd.

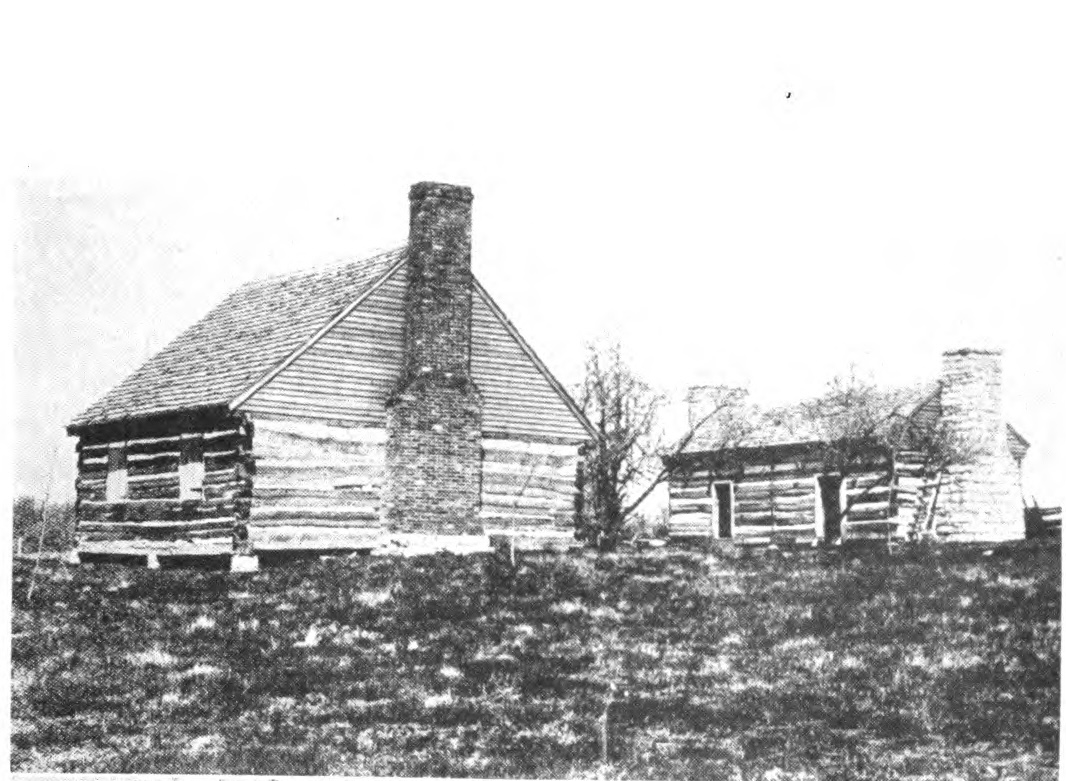
The building in the foreground, originally two stories, is the former Log Hermitage. The building in the background was constructed as a kitchen. Both structures were later used as slave quarters.

It is not immediately self-evident who Jackson meant by "our little son," although of the 30-odd minors to whom they served as guardian, some of whom Jackson called son in his letters, Andrew Jackson Jr. was the only ward that he and Rachel "considered to be a child of theirs." Lyncoya was "with the negroes" because he had been left in the care of Rachel's sister Mary Donelson Caffrey (either in Nashville or in the Natchez District of Mississippi Territory) while the Jacksons traveled, but Caffrey would not keep Lyncoya in the big house, instead boarding him in the slave quarter.

For a time, Lyncoya was educated along with Andrew Jackson's first adopted son, Andrew Jackson Jr. Jackson wrote Rachel from Washington, D.C. in 1823, "I would be delighted to receive a letter from our son, little Hutchings, & even Lyncoya—the latter I would like to exhibit to Mr Monroe & the Secretary of War, as I mean to try to have him recd. at the military school..." The editors of The Letters of Andrew Jackson, Volume V: 1821–1824 (published 1996) annotated this letters with the footnote that "Lyncoya wrote Jackson on December 29." The original appears to have been lost but what is said to be a "true copy" that was made at some point reads as follows:

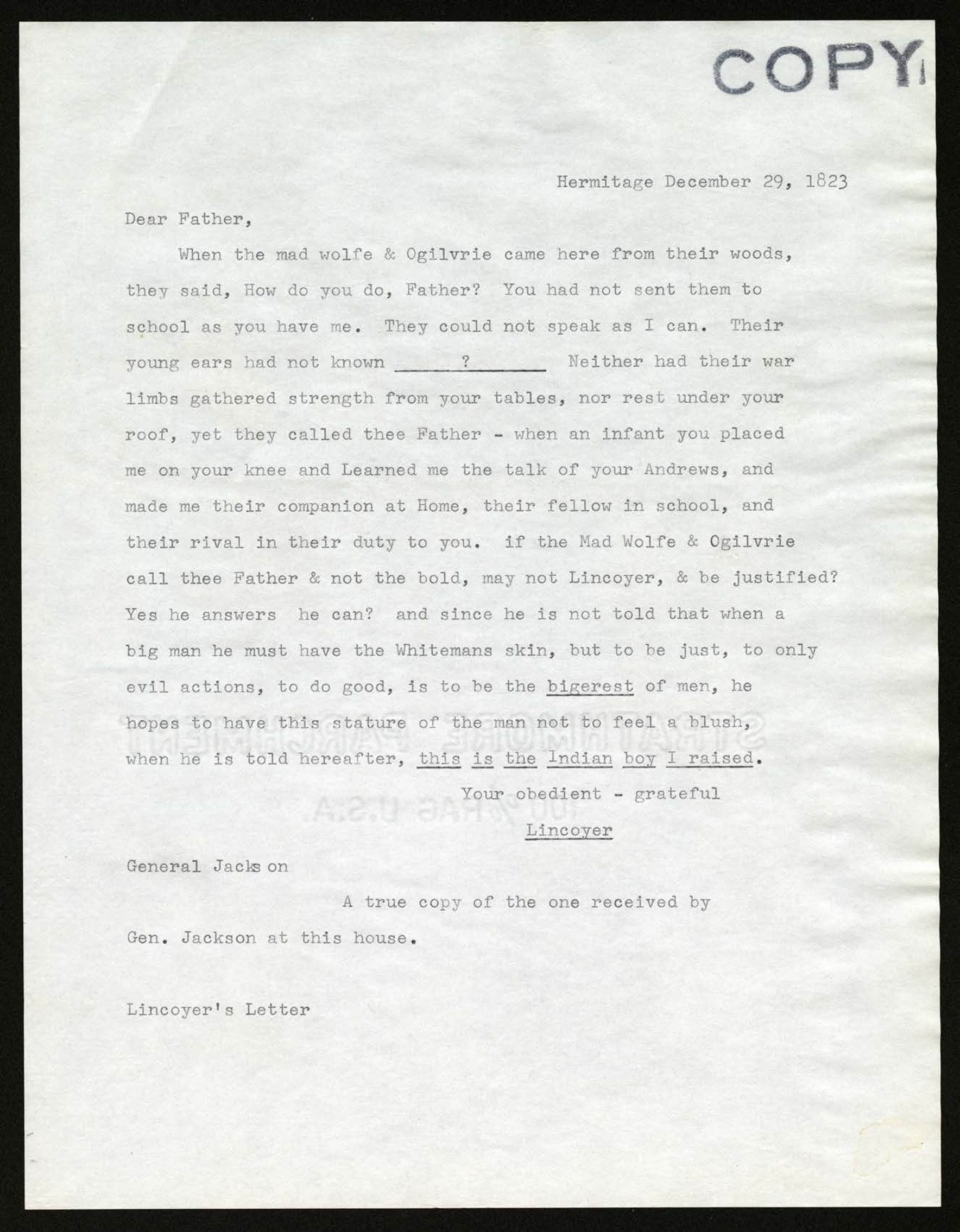
Jackson wrote to his wife Rachel on December 7, 1823, that "I would be delighted to receive a letter from our son, little Hutchings, & even Lyncoya," and according to editors of The Letters of Andrew Jackson, Volume V: 1821–1824 (published 1996), "Lyncoya wrote Jackson on December 29." This is a typed transcript of the handwritten transcript created during the Jacksonian era. (THS 42889)

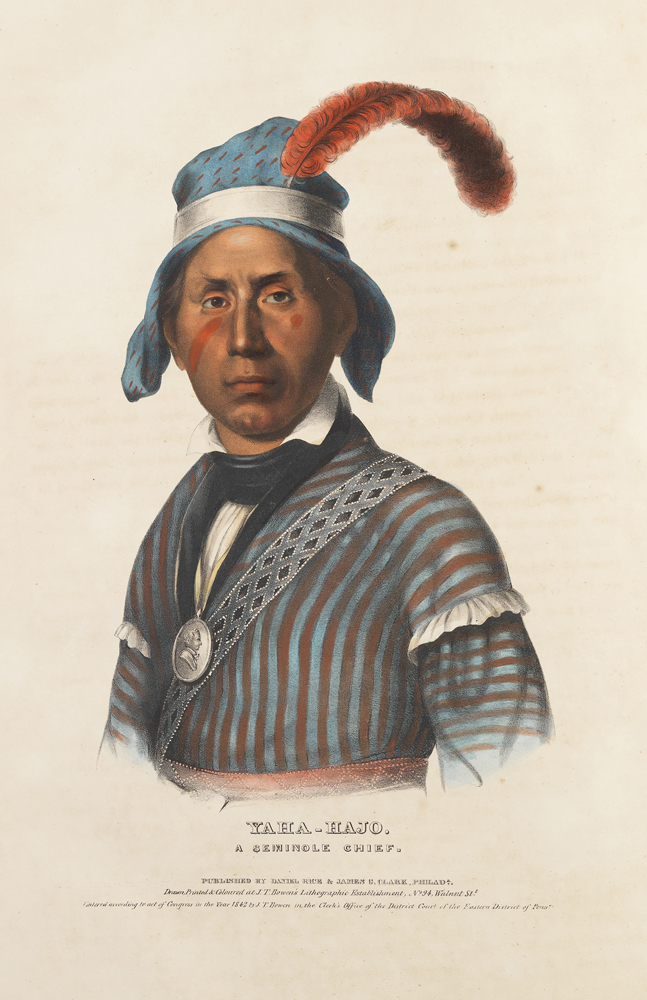
Lyncoya encountered Ya-ha Hadjo, also known as Mad Wolf, sometime before 1823; this portrait is most likely the work of Charles Bird King, and it appears in History of the Indian Tribes of North America, which was published between 1836 and 1845 (DeGolyer Library, Southern Methodist University)

Hermitage December 29, 1823

Dear Father,

When the mad wolfe & Ogilvrie came here from their woods, they said, How do you do, Father? You had not sent them to school as you have me. They could not speak as I can. Their young ears had not known ____?____ Neither had their war limbs gathered strength from your tables, nor rest under your roof, yet they called thee Father - when an infant you placed me on your knee and Learned me the talk of your Andrews, and made me their companion at Home, their fellow in school, and their rival in their duty to you. if the Mad Wolfe & Ogilvrie call thee Father & not the bold, may not Lincoyer, & be justified? Yes he answers he can? and since he is not told that when a big man he must have the Whitemans skin, but to be just, to only evil actions, to do good, is to be the bigerest of men, he hopes to have this stature of the man not to feel a blush, when he is told hereafter, this is the Indian boy I raised.

Your obedient - grateful

Lincoyer

General Jackson

A true copy of the one received by Gen. Jackson at this house.

According to the Tennessee Virtual Archive catalog, the "authenticity of this letter has come under scrutiny," but the Tennessee state archivist and Jackson biographer Robert V. Remini at least agreed that it was authentic to the period of the 1820s–30s. "This house" is possibly a reference to the District of Columbia boarding house of the wife of William O'Neal, "former owner of the well-known Franklin House, [who] now took Jackson, John H. Eaton, and Richard K. Call as boarders...across from the West Market near John Gadsby's Hotel." "Mad Wolfe" is Ya-ha Hadjo. The Muscogee name that is variously transliterated Harjo, Hajo, Hadjo, or Hadcho means, roughly, so crazy as to seem brave, or crazy levels of brave. Lyncoya's obituary stated that, "...he had no intercourse whatever with Indians, except on one or two occasions when a few chiefs called to visit the General; when they were observed to take but slight notice of him." Historian Melissa Jean Gismondi argues that the letter was written under the supervision of Lyncoya's tutor William Chandler, and was intended as an exhibit to be shared with Jackson's fellow politicians, as much or more than it was meant to be a personal missive from a 10-year-old child to his father. The letter was likely solicited because Jackson had aspirations to send Lyncoya to the United States Military Academy at West Point, which was his ambition for several of his male wards, including Edward G. W. Butler and Andrew Jackson Donelson, both of whom graduated class of 1820. Andrew Jackson Jr. and A. J. Hutchings were both sent to the University of Nashville. In January 1824, a few days after Lyncoya sent his letter, Jackson wrote to Andrew Jackson Jr. chiding him for not sending his own update on happenings at home: "Your papa has waited two weeks expecting to receive a letter from you informing him how your dear Mother is, and your Cousin, Andrew J. Hutchings, Lyncoya, and all the family."

=== Work and death ===
Ultimately, the education of Lyncoya did not continue past his time in neighborhood schools, and he was apprenticed to be a saddler. He lived with his master, Mr. Hoover, in Nashville in 1827. He died of tuberculosis at the Hermitage on July 1, 1828, when he was about 16 years old.

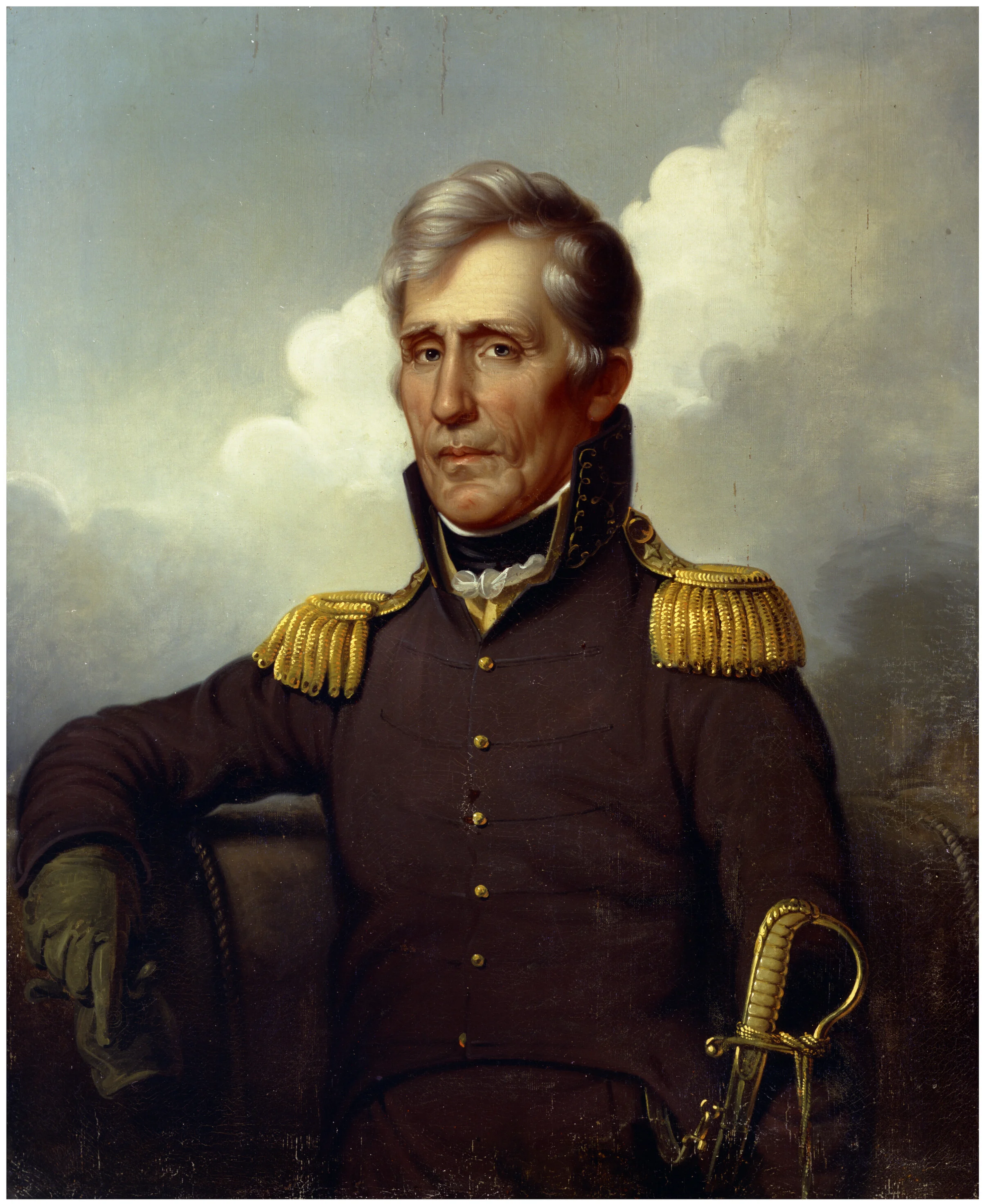
Andrew Jackson by Rembrandt Peale, painted 1819 in Washington, D. C. (Maryland Historical Society BCLM-CA.679)

Lyncoya was first introduced to the American electorate as early as 1815. In 1824, the year of Jackson's first presidential run, Jackson's conduct in regards to Lyncoya was described as having "set the gem of humanity in the laurel of victory." His 1828 obituary, published in a Tennessee newspaper, has been characterized as the "paternalistic devotional of a slaveholder." Black Horse Harry Lee, who lived at the Hermitage at the time and wrote for Jackson's 1828 presidential campaign, is said to have written an eloquent tribute to Lyncoya, which some describe as a lost document but is very possibly the obituary. (Note: Henry A. Wise used the phrase "fugitive pieces," which has been taken to mean "escaped" but an alternate definition of fugitive is "evanescent, fleeting, of short duration.") There is no evident mention of Lyncoya's death in Jackson's surviving correspondence.

Lyncoya's burial place is unknown, which is considered significant by historians because studying burial practices often yields insight into family systems. According to writer Stanley Horn, "At least one chronicle has stated that he was buried in the garden; but, if so, there is no sign of it. No stone there bears his name, and there is no unmarked grave in the family plot." It has also been conjectured that Lyncoya's unmarked grave was in the Hermitage's slave cemetery. The location of the Hermitage's slave cemetery was unknown until 2024 when a clue was found in a 1935 agricultural report and grant funding allowed researchers to deploy ground-penetrating radar to examine a candidate location.

== Historiography ==
Lyncoya Jackson is not listed as a descendant of Andrew Jackson in family trees included Robert V. Remini's Andrew Jackson and the Course of American Empire, nor in the family trees published in volume one of The Papers of Andrew Jackson, published 1980 and edited by Sam B. Smith and Harriet Chappell Owsley.

Historians Jeanne and David Heidler point out that the Lee-crafted obituary claimed that Lyncoya, who had never lived with Indians, "crafted a longbow" at age five and was drawn to adorn his hair with feathers, language that subtextually suggested that there was "something innately different about Indians made their assimilation difficult at best and perhaps impossible in a real world taken on its own terms. It was to say that Lyncoya, like all Indians, would have been happier with his own kind. Most of all, they would all be happier living somewhere else." A counter to the Jacksonian narrative about Lyncoya appeared in the John Quincy Adams-aligned National Journal in response to the obituary recording his life and death, excoriating both Jackson for his deeds and the obituary writer for his framing. The column, penned by one "Logan," concluded, "On the whole, the story of Lyncoya, be it true or be it false, is but an impotent apology for the Hero's bloody life."

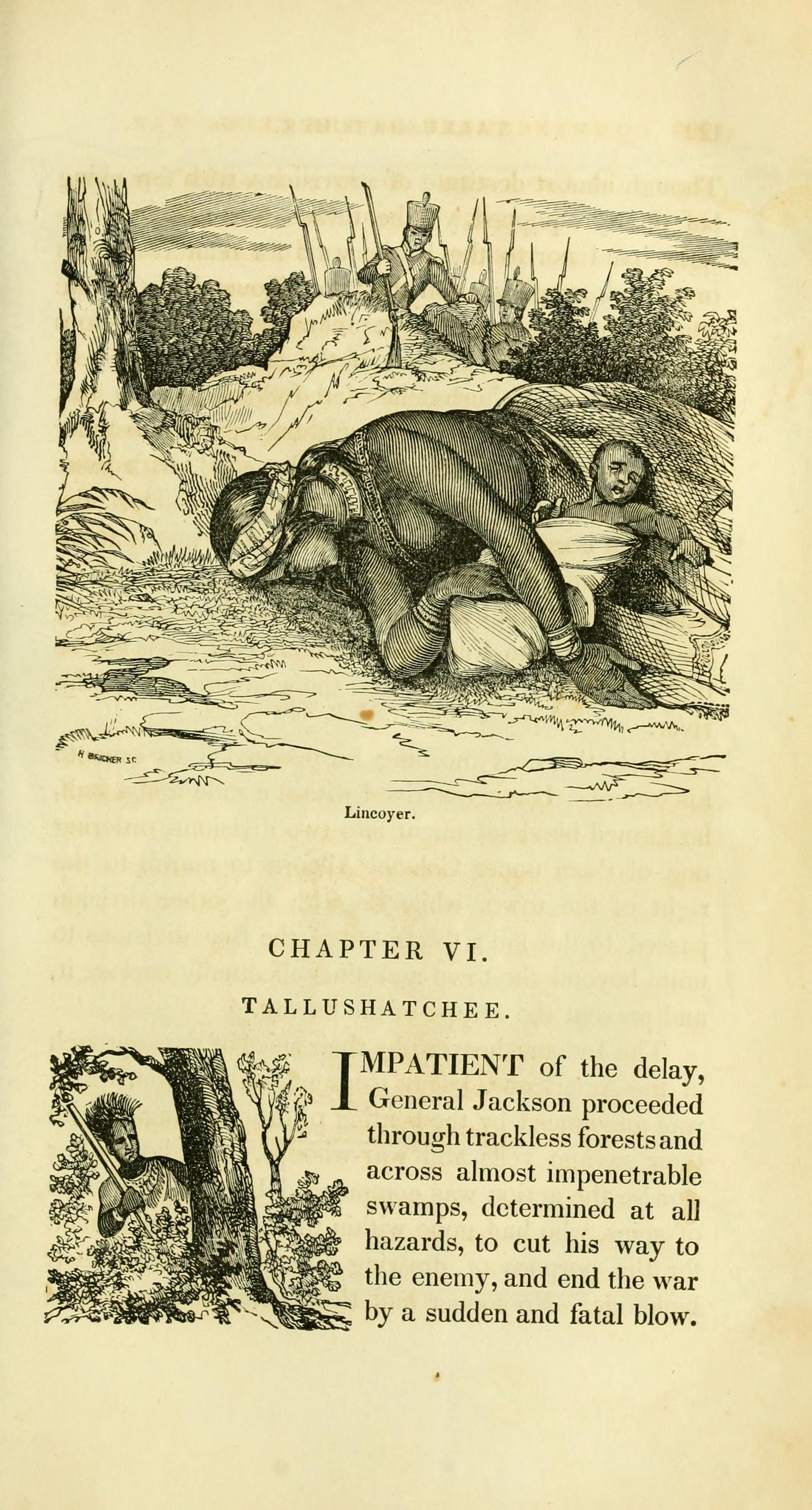
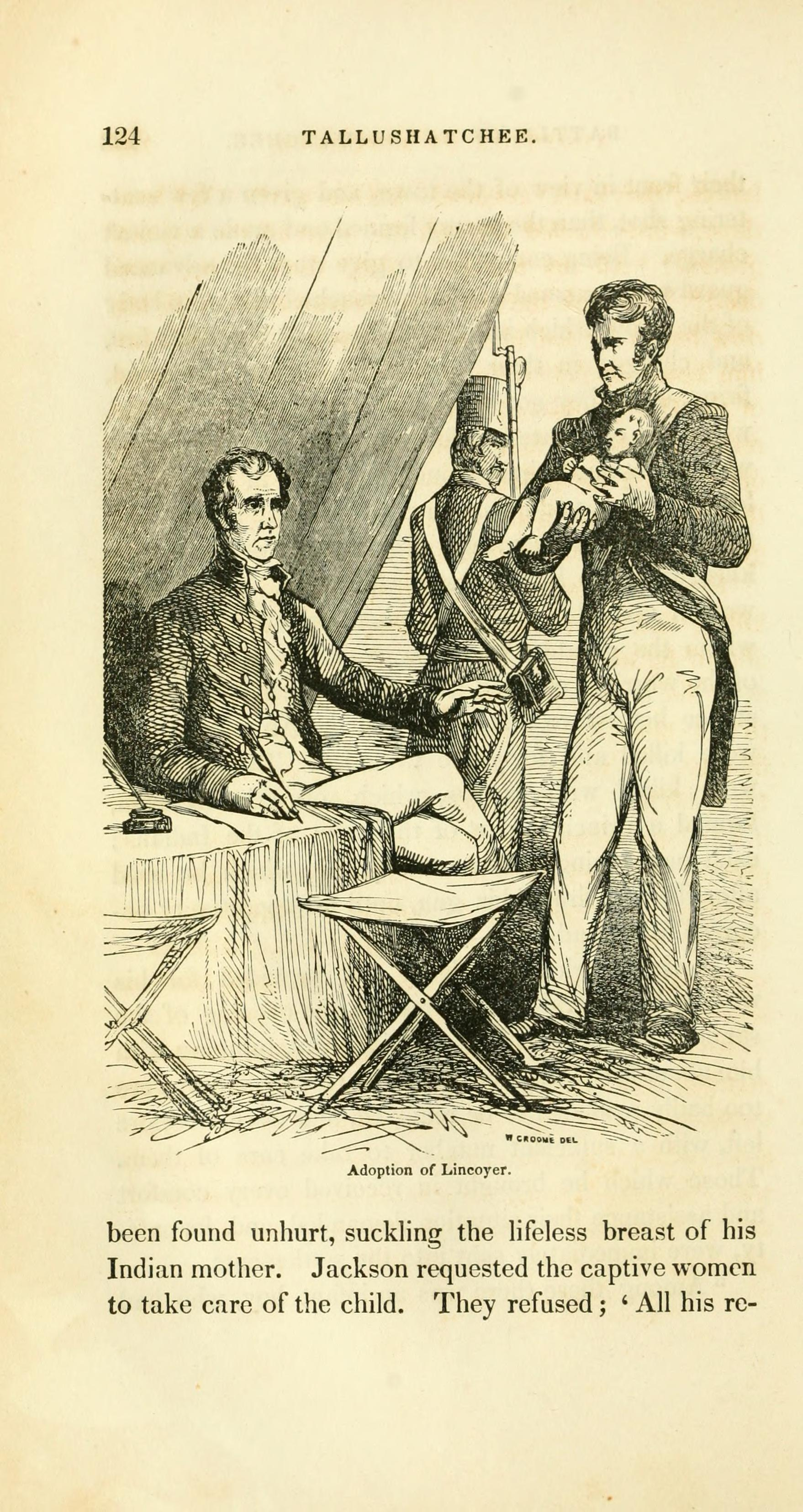
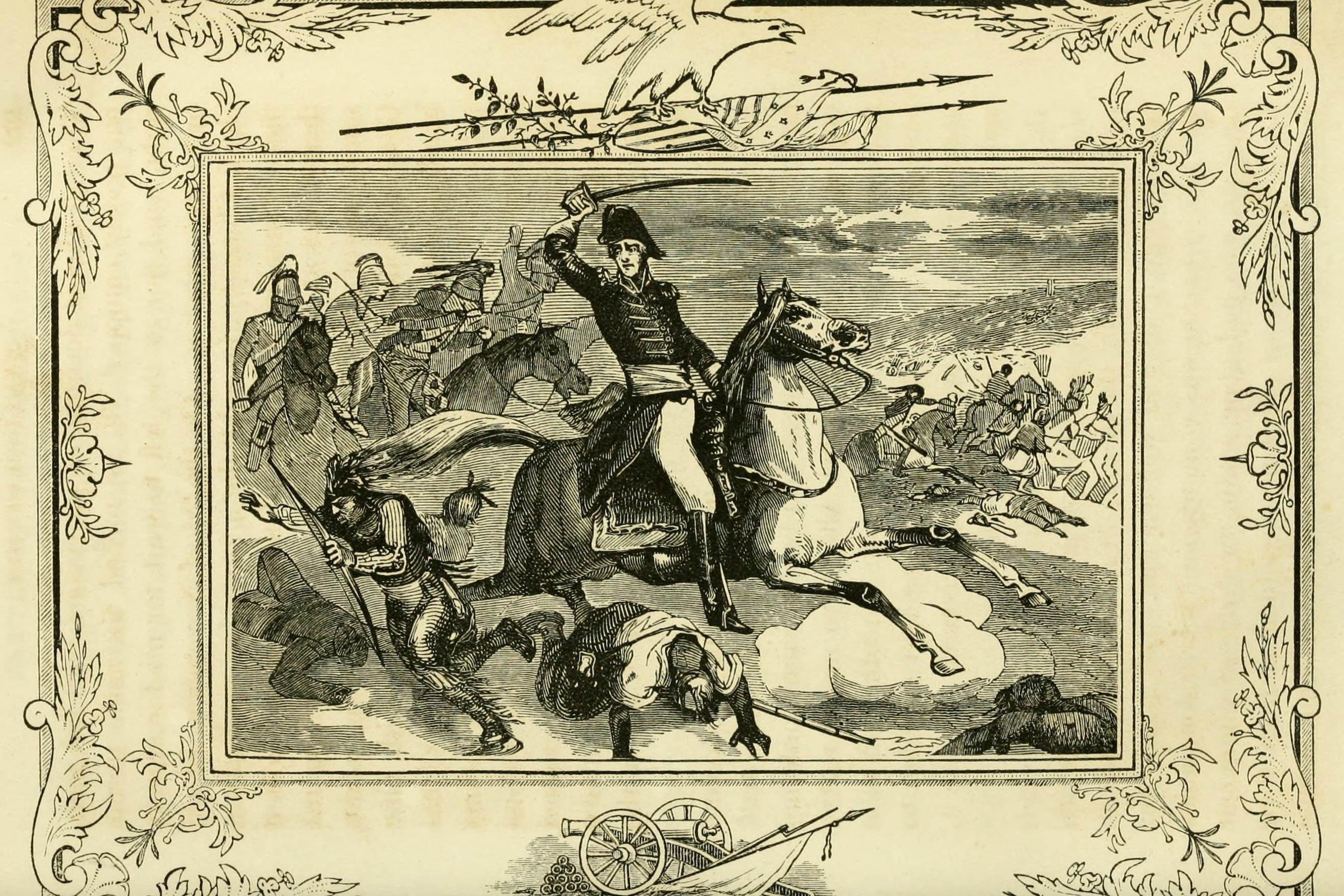
As imagined by illustrator William Croome for John Frost's 1847 Pictorial History of Andrew Jackson: "Lincoyer" and his dead mother, and either John Coffee or Andrew Jackson on the field of battle at Tallusahatchee (Jackson was not at Tallusahatchee)

In 1925 the white supremacist Tennessee archivist and historian John Trotwood Moore surfaced a letter wherein Jackson mentions Lyncoya, and explained that Lyncoya's mother had been killed in "self-defense" because "the Indian women were fighting alongside the men." However it was styled, the pro-Jackson retelling of Lyncoya's life typically "transferred the blame for the destruction of Indigenous families from Jackson to Muscogee women. Murderous women violated early American gender norms, which expected women to act to as dutiful and compassionate mothers."

A Jackson biographer writing in 1950 described Lyncoya was described as "an exotic and pitiful member of the Hermitage household." Historian Mark R. Cheathem, in the course of reviewing recently published histories of the Jacksonian era, wrote "The example of Lyncoya is often used by scholars and non-scholars alike to soften Jackson's treatment of Native Americans, and...sentimental language, unsupported by historical evidence, only reinforces this romanticized view...Lyncoya's place in the Jackson household [should be] situated within the context of recent scholarship on Indian adoption." The three war-orphan Indigenous children sent to the Hermitage, Lyncoya, Theodore, and Charley, are considered to be part of Jackson's domestic life, and Lyncoya in particular was featured in tours of the Hermitage beginning in the 1970s, which has resulted in conflict over how to frame the story: "Jackson and his troops had killed his entire family, which is the reason he was orphaned in the first place. Older white visitors frequently ask about Lyncoya unprompted, generally phrasing it as some derivative of, 'Didn't he adopt an...Indian boy?' Public knowledge of Lyncoya and his residence at the Hermitage cements him as a regular point of conversation in the mansion, and the framing of that conversation by interpreters serves to project an image of Jackson as either paternal and sentimental or ruthless and self-deluded." A memorial to Lyncoya was dedicated in Calhoun County, Alabama in 2000, but according to historian F. Evan Nooe, the monument centers Jackson as savior, such that it "provides comfort for the descendants of settlers in the present, casting aside the location as a site of trauma..."

In 2016, former U.S. Senator Jim Webb used Lyncoya as a defense against charges that Andrew Jackson was a génocidaire, writing that "it would be difficult to call someone genocidal when years before, after one bloody fight, he brought an orphaned Native American baby from the battlefield to his home in Tennessee and raised him as his son." However, historian Dawn Peterson argues that the image of Jackson as loving father of an Indigenous adoptee is not "an accurate reading of what happened here," but rather, summarizes Washington Post columnist Michael S. Rosenwald, "Jackson...made sure his early biographers [for instance, John Eaton] knew Lyncoya's story—about how Jackson saved the little Native American boy. It was pure spin, and plenty of historians fell for it."

== In popular culture ==
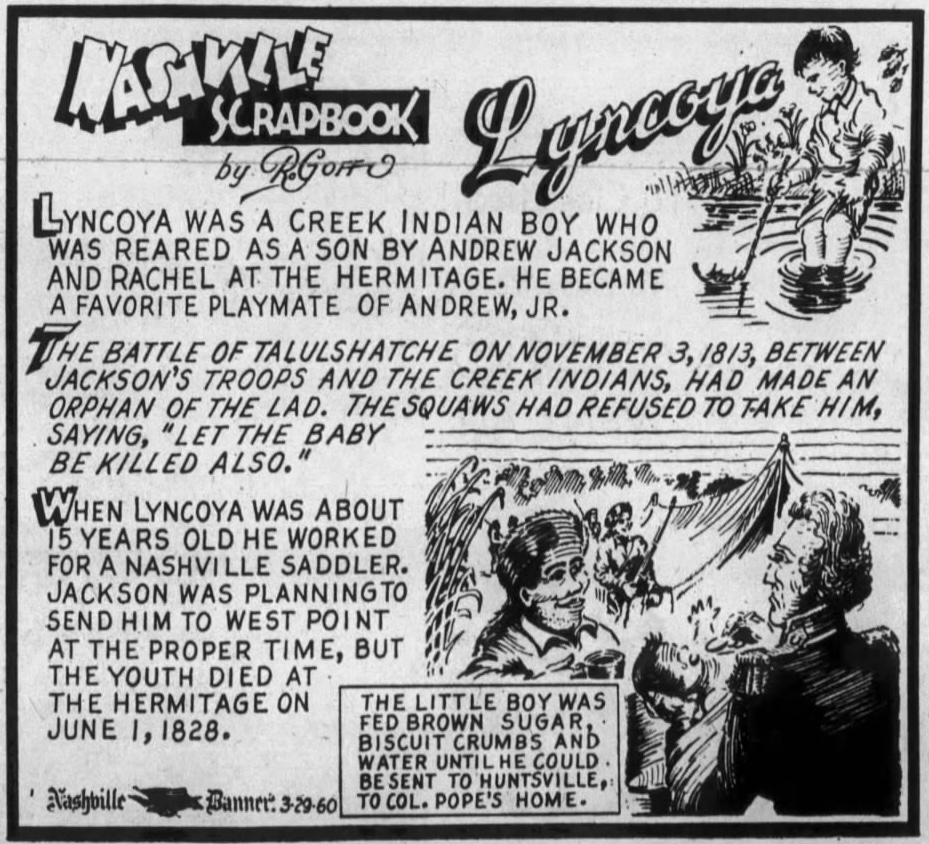
LYNCOYA – "Nashville Scrapbook" by R. Goff, Nashville Banner, March 29, 1960

- In 1969 a community theater in Pittsburgh produced Andy Jackson's Indian Boy as part of its "Preludes to Greatness" series of plays for children. Lyncoya was described as "lovable character with whom all youngsters identify."
- Lyncoya was the main character, but not the narrator, in Margery Evernden's juvenile historical fiction Lyncoya, published in 1973 by Henry Z. Walck.
- In 2009 artists Carlin Wing and Amelia Winger-Bearskin put on a show about Lyncoya at the Unusual Sympathy gallery in Nashville.
- Lyncoya Jackson is a character in the musical Bloody Bloody Andrew Jackson.
- A restaurant in Hendersonville Tennessee, the Lyncoya Cafe, is named after Lyncoya, whom the menu describes as a child “orphaned in battle” and raised as a son by Andrew Jackson “after the women of the village refused to care for him.”

== See also ==
- Indigenous members of the Andrew Jackson household
- Wards of Andrew Jackson
- Donelson family
- Treaty of Fort Jackson – 1814 treaty ending the Creek War
- Treaty of Cusseta – 1832 treaty between the United States and Creek
- Josiah Francis (Hillis Hadjo) – Muscogee Creek leader (c. 1770–1818)
- David Moniac – American soldier (1802–1836)
- Zintkála Nuni – Survivor of the Wounded Knee Massacre
- List of children of presidents of the United States § Andrew and Rachel Jackson
- Genocide Convention § Definition of genocide
- Adoption in the United States and Category:Adoption history
- Andrew Jackson and the slave trade

== Sources ==
- Abram, Susan (2012). "6. Cherokees in the Creek War: A Band of Brothers". In Braund, Kathryn E. Holland (ed.). Tohopeka: Rethinking the Creek War and the War of 1812. Tuscalosa, Alabama: University of Alabama Press. pp. 122–145. ISBN 978-0-8173-5711-5.
- Barna, Elizabeth Kathryn (2020). Between Plantation, President, and Public: Institutionalized Polysemy and the Representation of Slavery, Genocide, and Democracy at Andrew Jackson's Hermitage (Thesis). Nashville, Tennessee: Vanderbilt University.
- Black, Jason Edward (July 2005). "Authoritarian Fatherhood: Andrew Jackson's Early Familial Lectures to America's "Red Children"". Journal of Family History. 30 (3): 247–264. doi:10.1177/0363199005276946. ISSN 0363-1990.
- Braund, Kathryn E. Holland (October 2011). "Reflections on "Shee Coocys" and the Motherless Child: Creek Women in a Time of War". Alabama Review. 64 (4): 255–284. doi:10.1353/ala.2011.0004. ISSN 2166-9961.
- Cheathem, Mark R. (2014). Andrew Jackson, Southerner. Baton Rouge, Louisiana: Louisiana State University Press. ISBN 978-0-8071-5099-3. LCCN 2012049695. OCLC 858995561. Project MUSE book 26506.
- ——— (2019). "The Stubborn Mythology of Andrew Jackson". Reviews in American History. 47 (3): 342–348. doi:10.1353/rah.2019.0062. ISSN 1080-6628.
- Cole, Donald B. (2009). Vindicating Andrew Jackson: The 1828 Election and the Rise of the Two-Party System. American Presidential Elections. Lawrence, Kansas: University Press of Kansas. ISBN 978-0-7006-1661-9. LCCN 2009015244. OCLC 318645762. Project MUSE book 87476.
- DeWitt, John H. (1931). "Andrew Jackson and His Ward, Andrew Jackson Hutchings: A History Hitherto Unpublished". Tennessee Historical Magazine. 1 (2): 83–106. ISSN 2333-9012. JSTOR 42638062.
- Gismondi, Melissa (June 12, 2017). Rachel Jackson and the Search for Zion, 1760s–1830s (PhD, History thesis). Charlottesville, Virginia: University of Virginia. doi:10.18130/v3q364.
- Heidler, Jeanne T.; Heidler, David S. (2018). The Rise of Andrew Jackson: Myth, Manipulation, and the Making of Modern Politics. New York: Basic Books. ISBN 978-0-465-09756-2. LCCN 2018015938. OCLC 1056909422.
- Henderson, T. R. (July 2014). "The Destruction of Littafuchee, and a Brief History of American Settlement". Alabama Review. 67 (3). Alabama Historical Association. University of Alabama Press: 233–253. doi:10.1353/ala.2014.0028. ISSN 2166-9961. OCLC 1007553588. Project MUSE 552367.
- Horn, Stanley F. (1938). The Hermitage, Home of Old Hickory. Richmond: Garrett & Massie – via HathiTrust.
- Inman, Natalie R. (2017). Brothers and Friends: Kinship in Early America. Early American Spaces. Athens, Georgia: University of Georgia Press. doi:10.1353/book51901. ISBN 978-0-8203-5110-0. LCCN 2016055415. OCLC 985105661.
- Meredith, Rachel (May 2013). "There Was Somebody Always Dying and Leaving Jackson as Guardian": The Wards of Andrew Jackson (M.A. History thesis). Murfreesboro, Tennessee: Middle Tennessee State University. ProQuest 1538368.
- Nooe, F. Evan (2024). Aggression and Sufferings: Settler Violence, Native Resistance, and the Coalescence of the Old South. Indians and Southern History. Tuscaloosa: University of Alabama Press. ISBN 978-0-8173-2174-1.
- Ostler, Jeffrey (2019). Surviving Genocide: Native Nations and the United States from the American Revolution to Bleeding Kansas. New Haven, Connecticut: Yale University Press. doi:10.12987/9780300245264. ISBN 978-0-300-24526-4.
- Ray, Jonathan (2014). Andrew Jackson and the Indians, 1767–1815 (Thesis). Tuscaloosa: University of Alabama.
- Read, William A.; McMillan, James B. (1984) [1937]. Indian Place Names in Alabama. Library of Alabama Classics (Revised ed.). Tuscaloosa: University of Alabama Press. ISBN 9780817384722. LCCN 84002593. OCLC 45728228. Project MUSE book 6765.
- Plater, David D. (2015). The Butlers of Iberville Parish, Louisiana: Dunboyne Plantation in the 1800s. Baton Rouge: Louisiana State University Press. ISBN 978-0-8071-6128-9. Project MUSE book 48467.
- Remini, Robert V. (1977). Andrew Jackson and the Course of American Empire, 1767–1821. New York: Harper & Row. ISBN 978-0-8018-5912-0. LCCN 77003766. OCLC 1145801830.
- Snyder, Christina (2017). "Andrew Jackson's Indian Son: Native Captives and American Empire". In Garrison, Tim Alan; O'Brien, Greg (eds.). The Native South: New Histories and Enduring Legacies. Lincoln, Nebraska: University of Nebraska Press. pp. 84–106. doi:10.2307/j.ctt1q1xq7h.9. ISBN 978-0-8032-9690-9. JSTOR j.ctt1q1xq7h.9.
- Various; Jackson, Andrew (1984). Moser, Harold D.; MacPherson, Sharon (eds.). The Papers of Andrew Jackson, Volume II, 1804–1813. Knoxville: University of Tennessee Press. ISBN 978-0-87049-441-3. LCCN 79015078. OCLC 5029597.
- Wise, Henry A. (1872). Seven Decades of the Union: The Humanities and Materialism. Philadelphia: J. B. Lippincott & Co. LCCN 08019296. OCLC 1434150131.
