= Rachel Jackson =

Wife of Andrew Jackson, 7th president of the United States (1767–1828)

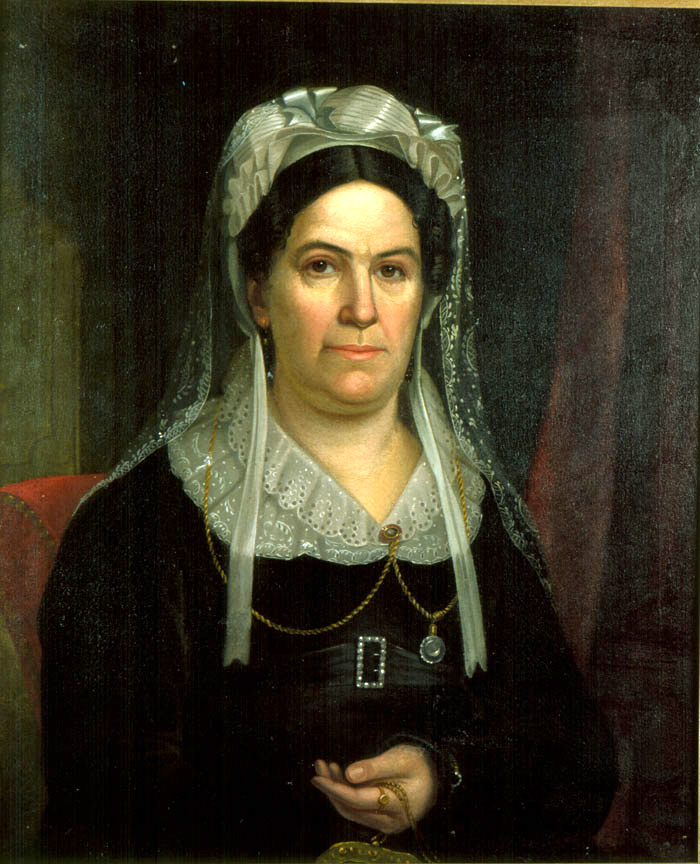
- Portrait by Ralph E. W. Earl, 1823
- Born: Rachel Donelson; June 15, 1767; Pittsylvania County, Colony of Virginia, British America
- Died: December 22, 1828 (aged 61); Davidson County, Tennessee, U.S.
- Resting place: The Hermitage (Nashville, Tennessee)
- Spouses: Lewis Robards (m. 1787; div. 1793) Andrew Jackson (m. 1794)
- Children: Andrew Jackson Jr. Andrew Jackson Donelson Andrew Jackson Hutchings Daniel Smith Donelson Lyncoya Jackson
- Parent(s): John Donelson; Rachel Stockley
- Relatives: Emily Donelson (niece); Andrew Jackson Donelson (nephew); Daniel Smith Donelson (nephew); John Donelson Martin (great-nephew); John Walker (nephew-in-law); Sarah Yorke Jackson (daughter-in-law)

Rachel Jackson (née Donelson; June 15, 1767 – December 22, 1828) was the wife of Andrew Jackson, the seventh president of the United States. She lived with him at their home at the Hermitage, where she died just days after his election and before his inauguration in 1829—therefore she never served as first lady, a role assumed by her niece, Emily Donelson.

Rachel Jackson was married at first to Lewis Robards in Nashville. In about 1791, she eloped with Andrew Jackson, believing that Robards had secured the couple a divorce. It was later revealed that he had not, meaning that her marriage to Jackson was bigamous. They were forced to remarry in 1794 after the divorce had been finalized.

She had a close relationship with her husband. She was usually anxious while he was away tending to military or political affairs. A Presbyterian, Rachel was noted for her deep religious piety. During the deeply personal prelude to the 1828 election, she was the subject of extremely negative attacks from the supporters of Andrew Jackson's opponent, John Quincy Adams. Jackson believed that these attacks had hastened her death, and thus blamed his political enemies.

== Early life and education ==
Rachel Donelson was born near the Banister River, about ten miles from Chatham, Virginia, in Pittsylvania County on June 15, 1767. Her father was Colonel John Donelson (1718–1785), co-founder of Nashville, Tennessee, and her mother was Rachel Shockley Donelson (1730–1801). Her great-grandfather Patrick Donelson was born in Scotland about 1670. She had seven brothers and three sisters:

- Alexander Donelson (1749–1785)
- Mary Donelson Caffery (born 1751). Wife of Captain John Caffery. Parents of Jane Caffrey wife of painter Ralph Eleaser Whiteside Earl and of Donelson Caffrey (1786–1835), father of Senator Donelson Caffery (1835–1906).
- Catherine Donelson Hutchings (1752–1835)
- Stockley Donelson (1753–1804)
- Jane Donelson Hays (1754–1834)
- John Donelson (1755–1830), father of Emily Donelson, first wife of Andrew Jackson Donelson; grandfather of CS General John Donelson Martin (1830–1862)
- William Donelson (1756–1820)
- Samuel Donelson (1758–1804), father of Andrew Jackson Donelson and CS General Daniel Smith Donelson
- Severn Donelson (1763– or 1773–1818)
- Leven Donelson (born 1765)

From about 1770 to 1779, her father operated the Washington Iron Furnace at Rocky Mount, Franklin County, Virginia. With her family, she moved to Tennessee at the age of 12. Her father led about 600 people from Fort Patrick Henry, in Northeast Tennessee, to Fort Nashborough, down the Cumberland River. The Donelson family were among the first white settlers in Tennessee.

== Appearance and personality ==
Rachel attracted much attention from suitors because she was very beautiful as a young woman, described by a contemporary as having "lustrous black eyes, dark glossy hair, full red lips, brunette complexion, though of brilliant coloring, [and] a sweet oval face rippling with smiles and dimples." Later in life, her country manners and full figure were severely in contrast with Jackson's tall, spindly form and developed genteel manners. However, her love for her husband was unmistakable: she languished when he was away for politics, fretted when he was away at war, and doted on him when he was at home. Unlike Jackson, Rachel never liked being in the spotlight of events. She would consistently warn her husband not to let his political accomplishments rule him; for example, after Jackson's victory at the Battle of New Orleans, she warned Jackson that his subsequent popularity (on the scope of George Washington) would tempt him to value his glory over his own family.

She was a Presbyterian. She was also an avid reader of the Bible and religious works as well as poetry.

According to a letter written in 1828 by her sister Jane Donelson Hays from her new home in Madison County, Tennessee, Rachel was close to her sisters, many of whom had lived in close proximity to each other in Middle Tennessee: "How does my dear sister Jackson do? I cannot take up my bonnet and meet you at sister Betsy's or sister Mary's...smoke our pipes, laugh and talk over occurrences of former days, each one taking the words out of the others mouth...It was a pleasant neighborhood."

== First marriage ==
Rachel Donelson's first marriage to Captain Lewis Robards of Harrodsburg, Kentucky, a landowner and speculator, was not happy, and the two separated in 1790. According to Marcia Mullins of the Hermitage in Nashville, Tennessee, there were rumors that Lewis Robards was cruel and jealous. Believing that her husband would file a petition for divorce, she returned to the Donelson family home.

In contrast, Ann Toplovich, executive director of the Tennessee Historical Society, writes that Rachel Donelson Robards knowingly left her husband for Andrew Jackson in late 1789, eloping to Spanish-controlled Natchez. (Note: In this article, "to elope"/"elopement" (as when Rachel Donelson eloped to Natchez with Andrew Jackson) has two related but incompatible denotations. In the context of the belief that Rachel had been wholly divorced from Lewis Robards, when Rachel elopes, "an unmarried person [...] run[s] away secretly for the purpose of getting married with one's intended spouse"; however, in the context of Rachel knowing full well that she had not been divorced yet, when Rachel elopes, "[a married person] run[s] away from home with a paramour".)

== Relationship with Andrew Jackson ==
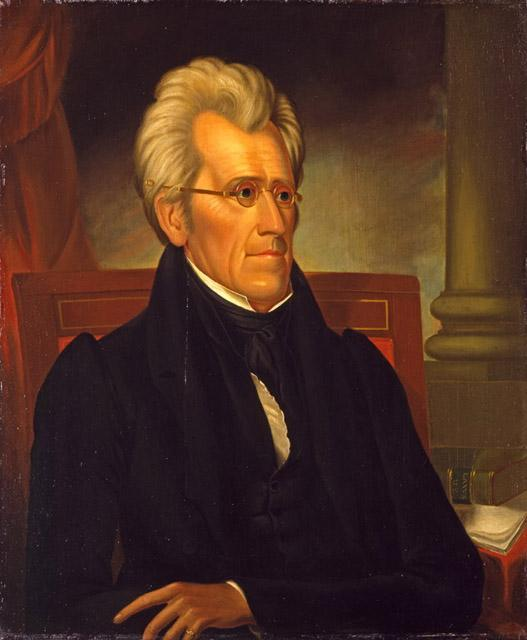
C. 1830–1832 portrait of President Andrew Jackson by Ralph E. W. Earl

When Andrew Jackson migrated to Nashville, Tennessee, in 1788, he boarded with Rachel Stockley Donelson, the mother of Rachel Donelson Robards. The two became close, and shortly after, they married in Natchez, Mississippi. Rachel believed that her husband had obtained a divorce, but as it had never been completed, her marriage to Jackson was inadvertently bigamous and therefore invalid.

Rachel's marital status was complicated by the distances involved and the changing governmental authorities. During the process of Rachel and Robards's divorce, Kentucky became a state instead of a territory of Virginia, and North Carolina turned over management of the territory including Tennessee to the federal government. These complicating factors were understood by locals and the unusual circumstances of the Jackson marriage were not greatly discussed in Nashville society.

In 1793, Andrew and Rachel Jackson learned that although Lewis Robards had filed for divorce, the divorce had never been granted. This made Rachel a bigamist and an adulteress, as well as making General Jackson, soon a politician on the rise, an adulterer. On the grounds of Rachel's abandonment and adultery, Lewis Robards was granted a divorce in 1794. At about the same time, the legitimacy of the Jackson marriage was questioned because they were married in then-Spanish-controlled Natchez, Mississippi. The Jacksons were Protestants, and only Catholic marriages were recognized as legal unions in that territory. After the divorce was legalized, Andrew and Rachel were married in Davidson County, Tennessee by Robert Hays, Rachel's brother-in-law and a justice of the peace.

Ann Toplovich of the Tennessee Historical Society argues that the above narrative, of unintentional bigamy and unintentional adultery, has concealed the fact of Rachel's agency and exercise of self-determination, and doesn't "give this strong woman credit for choosing a better husband". Toplovich explains that this narrative was concocted during Andrew Jackson's candidacy for president in the 1828 election: in order to "combat the attacks on Jackson’s character and Rachel’s virtue, the Jackson campaign formed the Nashville Committee [...][which] published a story with a new timeline and circumstances of the Jackson marriage — the alternative facts of the Jackson campaign were that Rachel thought she was already divorced when she joined her fate to Andrew Jackson in 1791."

== Children ==
Although the Jacksons never had biological children, they adopted her nephew in 1809 and named him Andrew Jackson Jr. When his father became president, Andrew Jr. assumed management of the Hermitage farm. He married Sarah Yorke of Philadelphia on November 24, 1831.

In 1813, the Jacksons adopted a Muscogee infant who had been orphaned by troops commanded by Rachel's niece's husband John Coffee at the Battle of Tallushatchee. Lyncoya was one of three Indigenous children brought to live at the Hermitage during the Creek War; Lyncoya, Theodore, and Charley were characterized as "pets" for the white adoptees and wards who lived there. Lyncoya was educated along with Andrew Jr., and Jackson had aspirations of sending him to West Point, as well. Political circumstances made that impossible, and he instead trained as a saddle maker in Nashville. He died of tuberculosis on June 1, 1828.

Around 1817 the Jacksons adopted Andrew Jackson Hutchings who was the grandson of Rachel's sister and the son of Jackson's slave-trading partner John Hutchings. He attended school with Andrew Jr. and Lyncoya. He then attended colleges in Washington and Virginia while Jackson was president. In 1833, he married Mary Coffee, daughter of Jackson's friend John Coffee, and moved to Alabama. Hutchings died in 1841.

Andrew Jackson served as the guardian for the children of Captain Edward Butler, Adjutant General and Inspector General of the United States Army from July 1793 until May 1794, and the children of Rachel's brother Samuel Donelson's son. These children did not live with the Jacksons full time. Andrew Jackson Donelson, son of Rachel's brother Samuel, became Jackson's protégé, and served as personal secretary to Jackson during his presidency.

== Election of 1828 and death ==
According to Toplovich, John Quincy Adams' presidential campaigns targeted Jackson's "passion and lack of self-control" in both 1824 and 1828, "making it central to the argument that he would devastate the integrity of the Republic and its institutions." One newspaper ran an article asking, "'Ought a convicted adulteress and her paramour husband to be placed in the highest offices of this free and Christian land?'"

The publicity surrounding her and the public knowledge of what was considered a very private matter caused Rachel to sink into depression. She reputedly told a friend "I would rather be a doorkeeper in the house of God than live in that palace in Washington." Adding to her stress, in 1828, Lyncoya Jackson died at the Hermitage. Between the scandal, her son's death, and a heart condition, she spent much of the campaign depressed and crying.

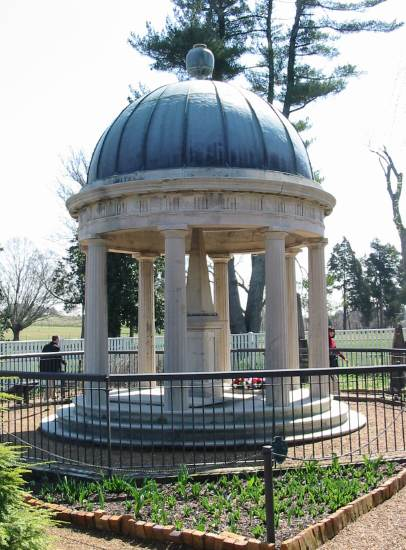
The tomb of Andrew and Rachel Jackson at the Hermitage

She died suddenly on December 22, 1828, at the age of 61 of a heart attack, given her symptoms according to Jackson: "excruciating pain in the left shoulder, arm, and breast."; symptoms that are typical of heart attacks in women. That her death came immediately before Jackson left for Washington was more than an inconvenience; it was crippling. He held her body tightly until he was pulled away, and he lingered at the Hermitage until the latest possible date.

Even though her maladies began as early as 1825, and she was a cigar smoker, Jackson always blamed his political enemies for her death. "May God Almighty forgive her murderers", Jackson swore at her funeral, "I never can."

She was buried on the grounds at the Hermitage wearing the white dress and shoes she had bought for the inaugural ball. Her epitaph, written by John Eaton, who would later become involved in the Peggy Eaton scandal during the Jackson Administration, reads: "A being so gentle and so virtuous slander might wound, but could not dishonor."

== Memorials ==
The Rachel Jackson State Office Building, in Nashville, Tennessee, built in 1985, was named for her.

== Popular culture depictions ==
Rachel Jackson was the title character of a 1951 historical novel by Irving Stone, The President's Lady, which told the story of her life with Andrew Jackson. In 1953, the novel was made into a film of the same name starring Susan Hayward and Charlton Heston as the Jacksons. In the 1936 film The Gorgeous Hussy (a fictionalized biography of Peggy Eaton), Rachel Jackson was portrayed by Beulah Bondi, who was nominated for the Academy Award for Best Supporting Actress for her performance. In December 1956, she was portrayed by Maureen Stapleton in the Studio One episode "Rachel". She also appears as a character in the stage musical Bloody Bloody Andrew Jackson, which includes multiple jokes about bigamy.

== See also ==
- The Hermitage (Nashville, Tennessee)
- Andrew Jackson Donelson
- John Donelson
- Rachel Jackson Stakes
- Bibliography of United States presidential spouses and first ladies
- Jackson Magnolia

== Sources ==
- Boller, Paul F. Jr. (2004). Presidential Campaigns: From George Washington to George W. Bush. New York: Oxford University Press. ISBN 9780198037378.
- Brinkley, Alan (2007). American History: A Survey (12 ed.). New York: McGraw-Hill.
- "Rachel Jackson". C-SPAN. March 25, 2013.
- Brands, H.W. (2005). Andrew Jackson: His Life and Times. New York: Knopf Doubleday Publishing Group. ISBN 1400030722.
- Meacham, Jon (2008). American Lion: Andrew Jackson in the White House. New York: Random House Publishing Group. ISBN 978-1-4000-6325-3.
- John Fiske (1914). "John Quincy Adams". In James Grant Wilson (ed.). The Presidents of the United States, 1789-1914. New York: Charles Scribner's Sons. In Wikisource.
- Remini, Robert V. (1977). Andrew Jackson and the Course of American Empire, 1767–1821. New York: Harper & Row Publishers, Inc. ISBN 978-0-8018-5911-3.
- "Rachel and Andrew Jackson's Love Story"
- Marszalek, John F. (1997). The Petticoat Affair: Manners, Mutiny, and Sex in Andrew Jackson's White House. Free Press. ISBN 0-684-82801-4.
- Toplovich, Ann (2005). "Marriage, Mayhem, and Presidential Politics: The Robards-Jackson Backcountry Scandal". Ohio Valley History. 5 (4): 3–22. ISSN 2377-0600. PDF AVAILABLE AT https://filsonhistorical.org/archive/ovhpdfs/OVH_V5N4_Toplovich.pdf
