= Theodore (Andrew Jackson captive) =

Indigenous American infant (c. 1813–c. 1814)

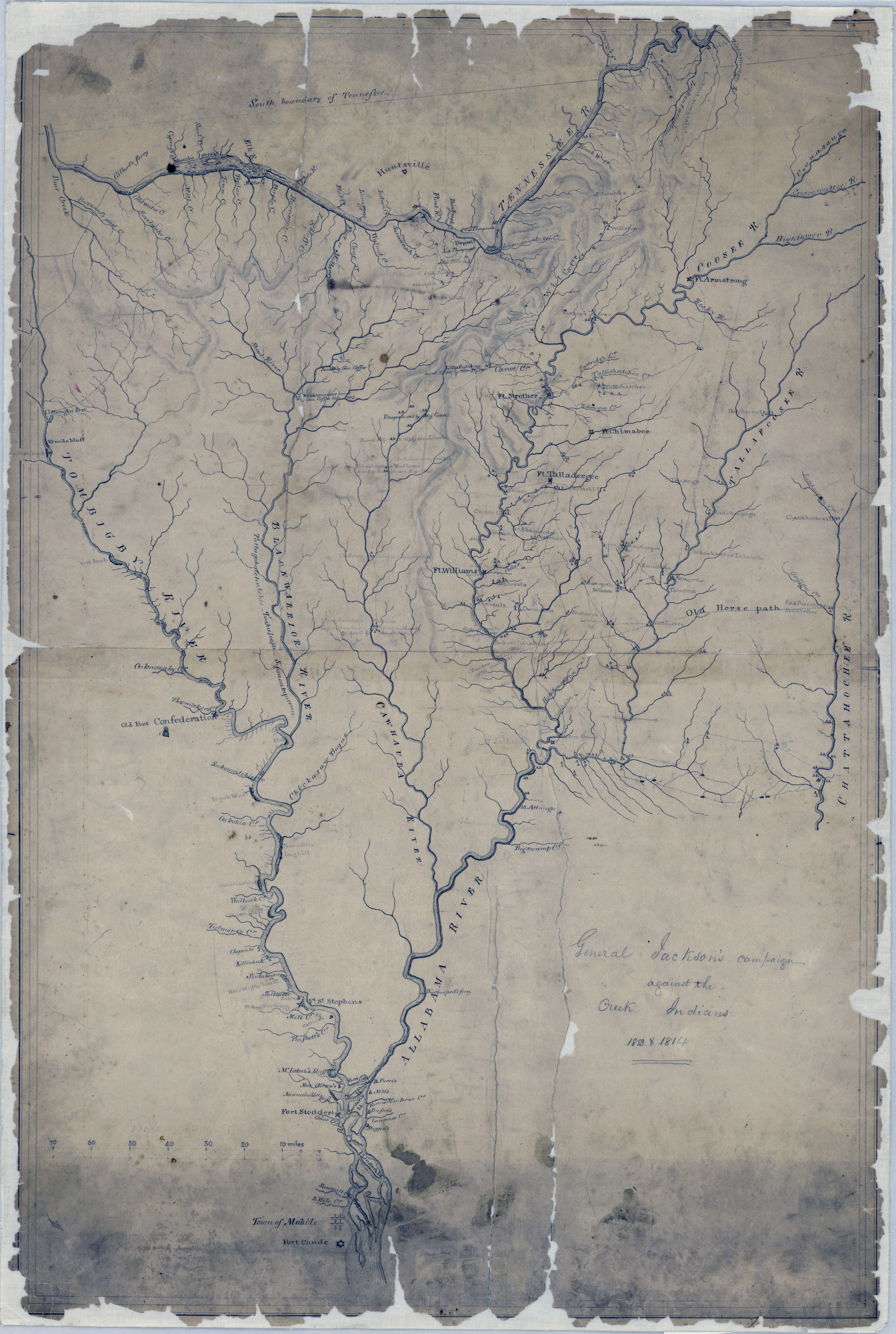
Littafuchee is located to the northwest of Fort Strother, marked "burnt 28 Oct. by Col. Dyer" (General Jackson's campaign against the Creek Indians 1813 & 1814, NAID 102279378)

Theodore (c. 1813 – before March 1814) was a baby or child who was "adopted" by Andrew Jackson during the early 1810s and sent to live at the Hermitage. He is presumed to have been of Muscogee heritage, but his family background and tribal affiliation are unclear. Andrew Jackson wrote to his wife Rachel on October 13, 1813, "Say to my little Andrew I have got a little Indian for him—which I will bring him when I return."

Theodore was one of the prisoners taken from the tribal town of Littafuchee, near Big Canoe Creek, in present-day St. Clair County, Alabama. According to one researcher, "Jackson referred to Theodore as 'Indian' but he could have belonged to any nation. Some historians have posited that Theodore was an enslaved African-American...Since chiefs often gave children whom they had obtained from raids, or through captive-raiding and adoption practices, Theodore could have belonged to any nearby native nation and may have had some white or African-American ancestry." The headman of Littafuchee, Bob Cataula, had surrendered the entire town, including an enslaved Choctaw woman and her children, and an enslaved black named Cato. The prisoners, consisting of 27 women and children, and nine men, were sent to Huntsville and Nashville. The 36 prisoners sent away arrived as 35, because infant Theodore was "separated from his mother and sent to Jackson's home." Theodore was described as a "pet" or playmate for Andrew Jackson Jr., who was then about five years old. When Lyncoya, another Muscogee war orphan, was sent north to Nashville, Jackson described him as "about the size of Theodore and much like him."

Theodore died in the late winter or early spring of 1814. Jackson wrote his wife from Fort Strother on March 4, 1814, "...I am sorry, that little theodore is no more, I regret it on Andrew account, I expect he lamented his loss-to amuse him, and to make him forget his loss, I have asked Col Hays to carry Lyncoya to him..." Historian Evan Nooe wrote of Theodore's successor, Lyncoya, who survived until he was 16, "[He] lived a short life under the oversight of his parents' killers."

According to one historian, Jackson Jr. "threw a fit when his own playmate died and coveted Charley," who was another Indigenous captive and the assigned playmate of Andrew Jackson Donelson. Lyncoya Jackson, who was captured at the Battle of Tallushatchee ("all his family is destroyed") arrived at the Hermitage in May 1814.

== See also ==
- List of children of presidents of the United States § Andrew and Rachel Jackson
- Genocide Convention § Definition of genocide
- Adoption in the United States and Category:Adoption history

== Sources ==
- Henderson, T. R. (July 2014). "The Destruction of Littafuchee, and a Brief History of American Settlement". Alabama Review. 67 (3). Alabama Historical Association. University of Alabama Press: 233–253. doi:10.1353/ala.2014.0028. ISSN 2166-9961. OCLC 1007553588. Project MUSE 552367.
