= Charley (Andrew Jackson captive) =

War orphan (fl. 1814)

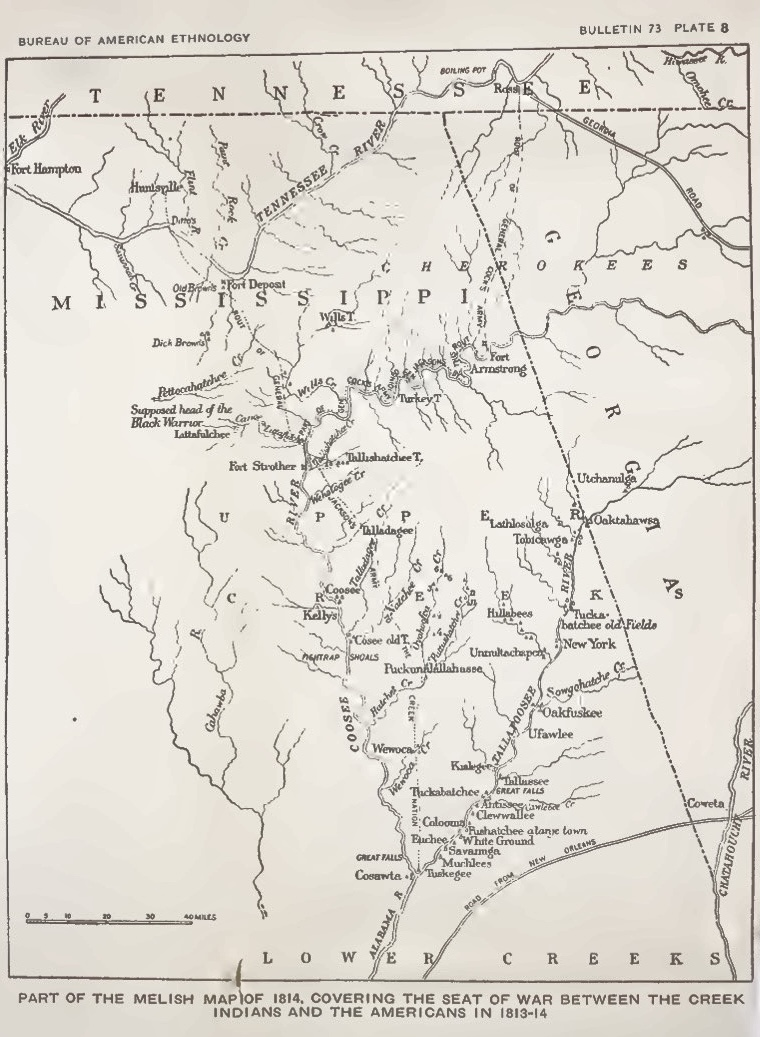
Part of the John Melish map of 1814, covering the seat of war between the Creek Indians and the Americans in 1813–14 (Smithsonian Bureau of Ethnology, 1922)

Charley (fl. February–April 1814) was a Native American baby or child given by Tuskena Hutka of Talladega, also known as James Fife, a White Stick Creek interpreter and member of the Creek National Council, to Andrew Jackson during the Red Stick War. Jackson wrote home on February 21, 1814, from Fort Strother:

...say to my little darling Andrew, that his sweet papa will be home shortly, and that he sends him three sweet kisses—I have not heard whether Genl Coffee has taken on to him little Lyncoya—I have got another Pett-given to me by the chief Jame Fife, that I intend for my other little Andrew [Jackson] Donelson and if I can a third I will give it to little Andrew [Jackson] Hutchings...

Charley was sent to the Hermitage to live and was intended for as a companion for Donelson, who was then about 12 or 13 years old. Rachel Jackson wrote Andrew Jackson on April 7, 1814, "...your Little Andrew is well Is much pleased with his Charley—I think him a fine Boy indeed." The next day, April 8, 1814, Andrew Jackson Jr., who was about five years old, wrote the general asking about the impending arrival of Lyncoya and offering a critique of his companion: "…I like Charly but he will not mind me."

Charley's fate is unknown but he most likely died young. One scholar speculates that he was an older child and that he simply fled from Hermitage when the opportunity presented itself. Another theory is that he survived and was integrated into the Hermitage work force as a manager of Jackson's stable, as Jackson wrote to Francis P. Blair in 1842, "Under their late superintendent, my faithful Charly, [the horses] are doing well."

Scholars have speculated on Jackson's martial and psychological motives from bringing Indigenous children into his home, but the only testimony in his letters suggests that he identified with their orphanhood, as he had lost his entire surviving family (mother and two brothers) during the American Revolutionary War. Historian Lorman Ratner described Jackson as a boy without a father, and a man without sons, which may have motivated him to accept guardianship of at least 32 young people who lived with him at various times or who he assisted legally, financially, or socially. According to historian Christina Snyder:

Jackson clearly intended the child, as with Lyncoya and Andrew Jr., to endear him to his ward. The value of sending Indian children to his white male dependents lay in the assumption that both Jackson and the young white men within his household shared masculine prerogatives over people who were not unquestionably 'white'...[this] was part of a broader impulse on the part of the Southern general to inculcate in his son and his wards the sense that they had the right to consume the bodies and resources of others, in this case Indian people and their material possessions, to satisfy their own wishes."

Around the time Charley was being transported to the Hermitage, Jackson made a speech at the Horseshoe Bend battlefield expressing his feelings about the fate of the Muscogee, stating, "The fiends of the Tallapoosa will no longer murder our Women and Children, or disturb the quiet of our borders...They have disappeared from the face of the Earth...How lamentable it is that the path to peace should lead through blood, and over the carcasses of the slain!! But it is in the dispensation of that providence, which inflicts partial evil to produce general good."

== See also ==
- Theodore (Andrew Jackson captive)
- List of children of presidents of the United States § Andrew and Rachel Jackson
- Genocide Convention § Definition of genocide
- Adoption in the United States and Category:Adoption history
