= Littafuchee =

Upper Creek village burned 1813

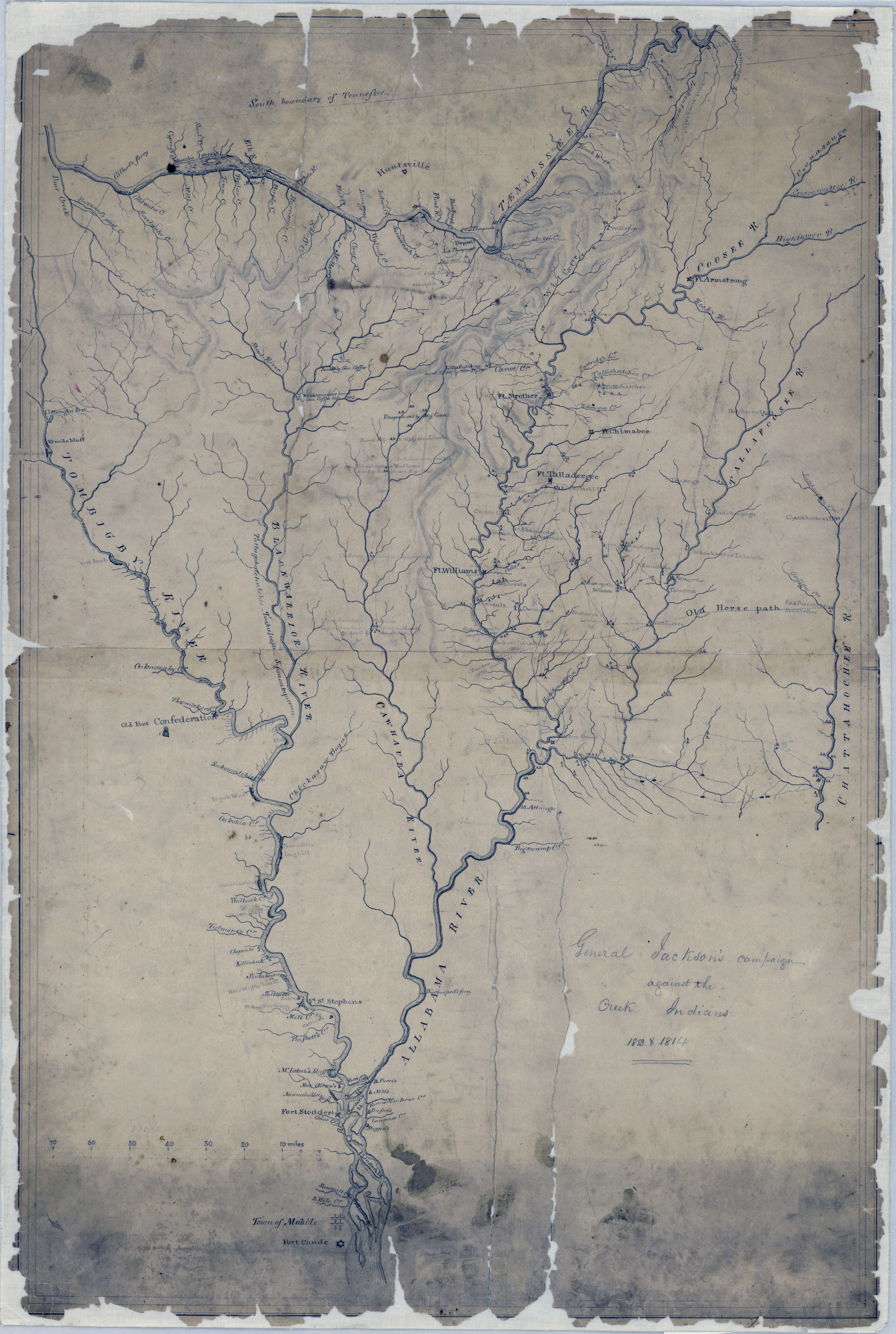
"General Jackson's campaign against the Creek Indians 1813 & 1814", showing the Muscle Shoals of the Tennessee River and the Alabama River watershed; Littafuchee is marked just north of Fort Strother

Littafuchee (alternative: Litafatci) was a village of the Upper Creek people. Littafuchee was located near Canoe Creek, a tributary of the Coosa River, in what is now St. Clair County, Alabama. Flint projectile points were produced in a craft workshop there; the village name means "makers of arrowheads" or "making of arrows." The town was burned by Colonel Robert Henry Dyer in October 1813 during the Red Sticks War. The Americans took 29 prisoners and 300 head of cattle belonging to village headman Bob Cataula. Among prisoners was a baby who was taken to Andrew Jackson's Hermitage as a "little Indian" for his son; this baby was called Theodore. Seven people who had been slaves of Cataula were sold at auction at Nashville, Tennessee, in June 1814.
