= Andrew Jackson Jr. =

Adopted son of U.S. President Andrew Jackson (1808–1865)

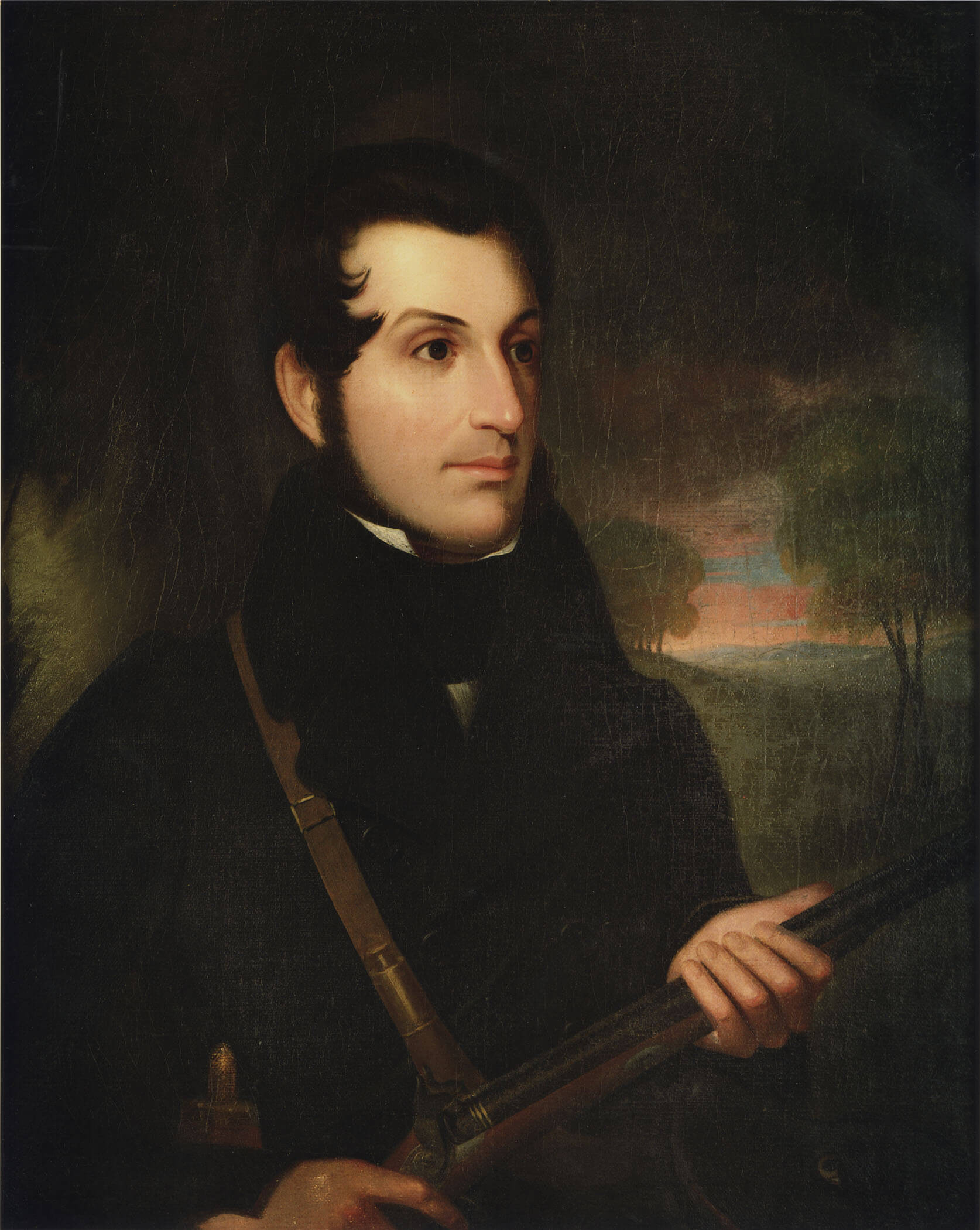
- Portrait by Ralph Eleaser Whiteside Earl
- Born: December 4, 1808; United States
- Died: April 17, 1865 (aged 56); United States
- Spouse: Sarah Yorke Jackson (m. 1831)
- Children: 5
- Parent(s): Andrew Jackson (adoptive father) Rachel Jackson (adoptive mother & paternal aunt)

Andrew Jackson Jr. (December 4, 1808 – April 17, 1865) was the adopted son of seventh U.S. president Andrew Jackson. Andrew Jackson Jr., a biological child of Rachel Jackson's brother Severn Donelson and Elizabeth Rucker, was the one child among the more than three dozen wards of Andrew Jackson that they considered to be their own child. As presented in an 1878 newspaper feature on the surviving Jackson descendants still resident at the Hermitage, "In after years Gen. Jackson had other nephews, to whom he gave a hearty welcome into his home, but to none other did he ever give his name or make heir to his fortune. One of these other nephews was the distinguished Andrew Jackson Donelson, who ran for Vice President on the Fillmore ticket, and who was always associated with the General, but who was not the bona fide adopted son, as many suppose." According to historian Robert V. Remini, Andrew Jackson Jr. was "irresponsible and ambitionless, a considerable disappointment to his father." Junior was sued 13 times in the last seven years of Andrew Jackson's life. When former president Jackson died in 1845, Junior inherited real and enslaved human property valued at roughly $150,000. Within a decade, he had turned this fortune into roughly $100,000 in debt. Jackson Jr. died of tetanus in 1865 after he accidentally shot himself while hunting.

== Birth, adoption, childhood ==
For unknown reasons, the Jacksons were unable to produce biological children. (Urologists studying infertility in presidents state that Jackson's bouts with smallpox and malaria could both have resulted in male-factor infertility.) Historian Melissa Gismondi theorizes that female-factor infertility may have been a factor in the collapse of Rachel's first marriage, to Lewis Robards. (Robards was reported to "frequent the slave quarters" and thus may have fathered a child with an enslaved concubine, affirming his own fertility. He went on to have eight sons and two daughters with his second wife Hannah Winn.) Rachel's inability to conceive and/or carry to term was unique amongst the women in her immediate family. Her mother delivered 11 living children who survived into adulthood. Seven of Rachel's siblings married and started families, producing an average of nine children per family. There is an account of Rachel Jackson saying, "He would have given his life for a child, but knowing how disappointed I was at never being a mother, he, pitying me, tried to console me by saying that God denied offspring so that we might help those who had large families."

Born a twin, Andrew Jackson Jr. was one of the eight or nine biological children of Rachel's brother Severn Donelson and Elizabeth Rucker, and he was taken to the Hermitage when he was three days old. His twin was named Thomas Jefferson Donelson. Jackson Jr. was the one adoptee or ward of Andrew Jackson with whom "the Jacksons had a special relationship" and whom "they regarded as their own child." Jackson, descendants, and succession of biographers have described Junior as Jackson's adopted son, sometimes claiming that Jackson had the Tennessee legislature passed a special act for the adoption, but "it does not appear that Andrew Jackson Jr. (or simply Junior) was ever legally adopted, and the reason Severn and Elizabeth were willing to give a twin boy to the Jacksons to raise as their own is also unknown." As recounted by Andrew Jackson Jr.'s grandson, Andrew Jackson IV, who apparently retold the story as it had been passed down from "Old Hannah" (1770–1846; not to be confused with "House Hannah" or "Ingen Hannah"), "word was brought one morning to The Hermitage while Old Massa and Missus were at breakfast that twin boys had been born to Mrs. Jackson's brother, Severn Donelson, living two miles distant. Old Missus looked across at the General saying, 'I'm afraid brother's wife will be unable to raise both the little fellows, with all those other children—she isn't very strong you know.' 'Suppose we take one of them,' she added. Massa look at her a minute queer like—then said, 'Well, suppose I have the horses brought around after breakfast and we will ride over and see how they feel about it.' Sure enough they did take one of the twins and it was made Old Hannah's special charge to look after the boy through childhood." Jackson's twin wrote the Nashville Dispatch in 1865 with corrections to his brother's obituary: "The absurd story of the infant being carried home in a pocket handkerchief by General Jackson contradicts itself, as we were born in the cold month of December. The truth is the General was absent at the time, and Mrs. Jackson wrote to him on the subject of adopting the child."

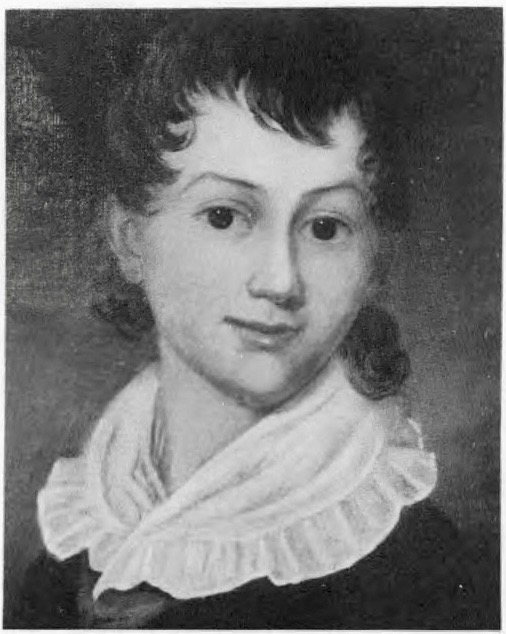
Andrew Jackson Jr. in childhood, painted by cousin-in-law Ralph Eleazer Whiteside Earl (Ladies' Hermitage Association Collection)

In 1813, following the surrender of the village of Littafuchee during the Creek War, Andrew Jackson separated an infant from his family and sent him to live at the Hermitage, writing to Rachel, "Say to my little Andrew I have got a little Indian for him—which I will bring him when I return." The Jackson family called this baby Theodore, but he died by the spring of 1814; five-year-old Andrew Jackson Jr. was reported to be very upset.

When Severn Donelson died in 1818, he did not ask Jackson to be guardian to his surviving children, and instead selected his brother William Donelson to be guardian.

== Education and marriage ==
Andrew Jackson Jr. and his cousin Andrew Jackson Hutchings attended school at Davidson Academy beginning in 1821. According to Linda Galloway, an 1825 bill to the senior Jackson shows "that Andrew Junior lived like a young lord. He had a body servant, probably Alfred, and his own horse. His wardrobe included such items as: a suit, $76.87; a hat, $10; silk hose, $1.50 a pair; and imported handkerchiefs. While attending school at Nashville in 1825, he accumulated a debt of $309 to the establishment of Josiah Nichol, who outfitted the elite of Nashville with everything from saddle blankets to clothes. It has been said this same sum would have kept the average Tennessee family for a year." He appears to have been fairly successful to his schooling, and books in the Hermitage library with his name on the fly leaf include The Autobiography of Crockett, Tom Jones, and Field's Literary and Miscellaneous Scrapbook.

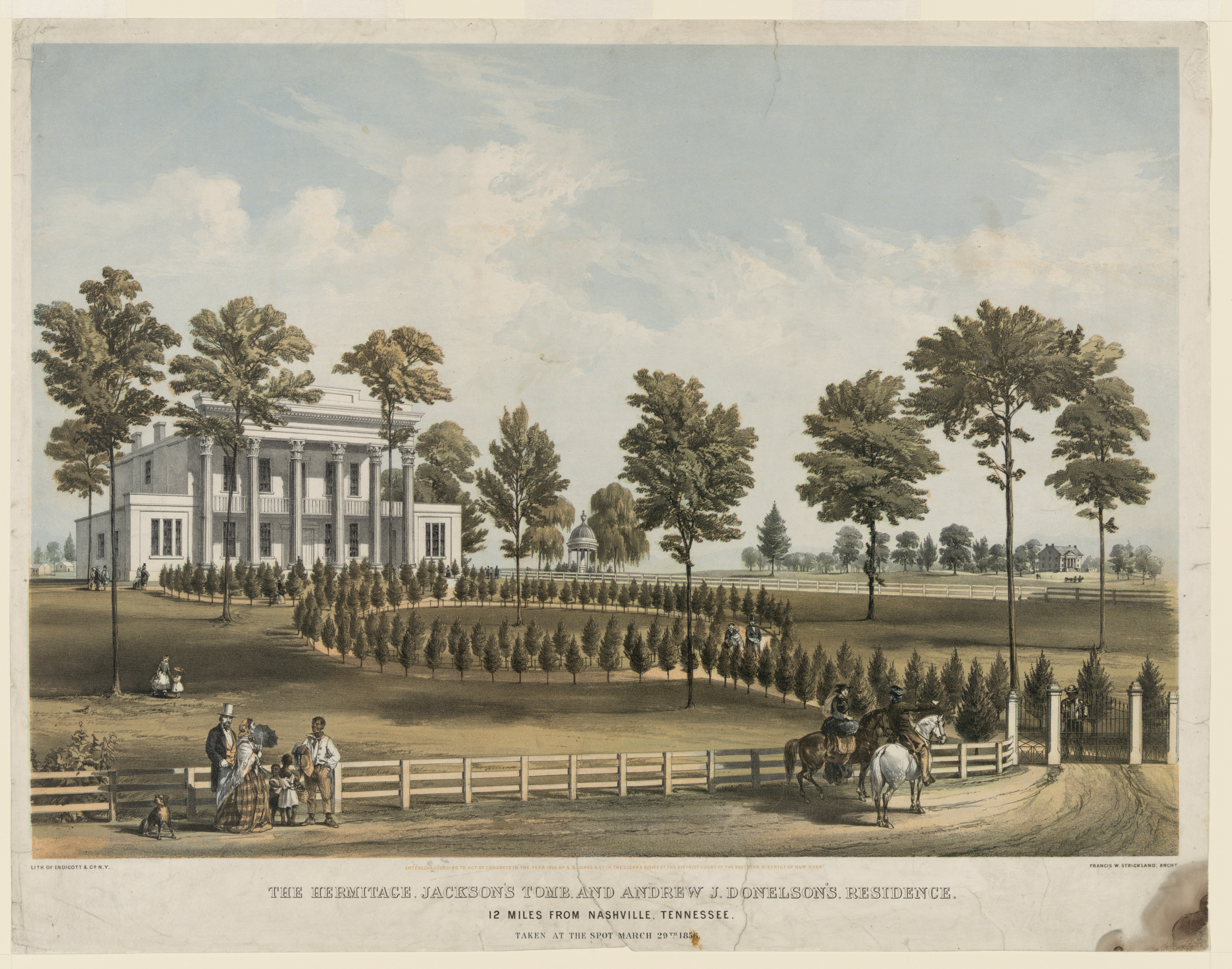
"The Hermitage, Jackson's tomb, and Andrew J. Donelson's residence 12 miles from Nashville, Tennessee. Taken at the spot, March 29, 1856" (Endicott & Co. lithograph, LCCN 2003664953)

When his mother died and his father was elected president in 1828, he periodically visited Washington—where he was considered popular, socially adept, and handsome—before returning to Nashville to manage The Hermitage and his father's business affairs. Jackson frequently inquired about or suggested prospective brides for Junior in his letters home. Jackson did not attend his son's wedding to Sarah Yorke Jackson, sending nephew Ralph Earl in his stead, and sending the bride a pearl ring that contained a lock of his hair. President Jackson also gave Sarah Yorke a legally enslaved girl named Gracy to serve as her ladies' maid, sponsored an expansion of the Hermitage for the young couple and paid for $2,000 in new furniture. Giving Gracy, or any enslaved person, as a gift to his son and daughter-in-law "kept valuable commodities within the extended white family, giving the next generation opportunities for greater wealth and status by providing additional labor both in the home and in clearing land and increasing crop production."

== Life and debt ==
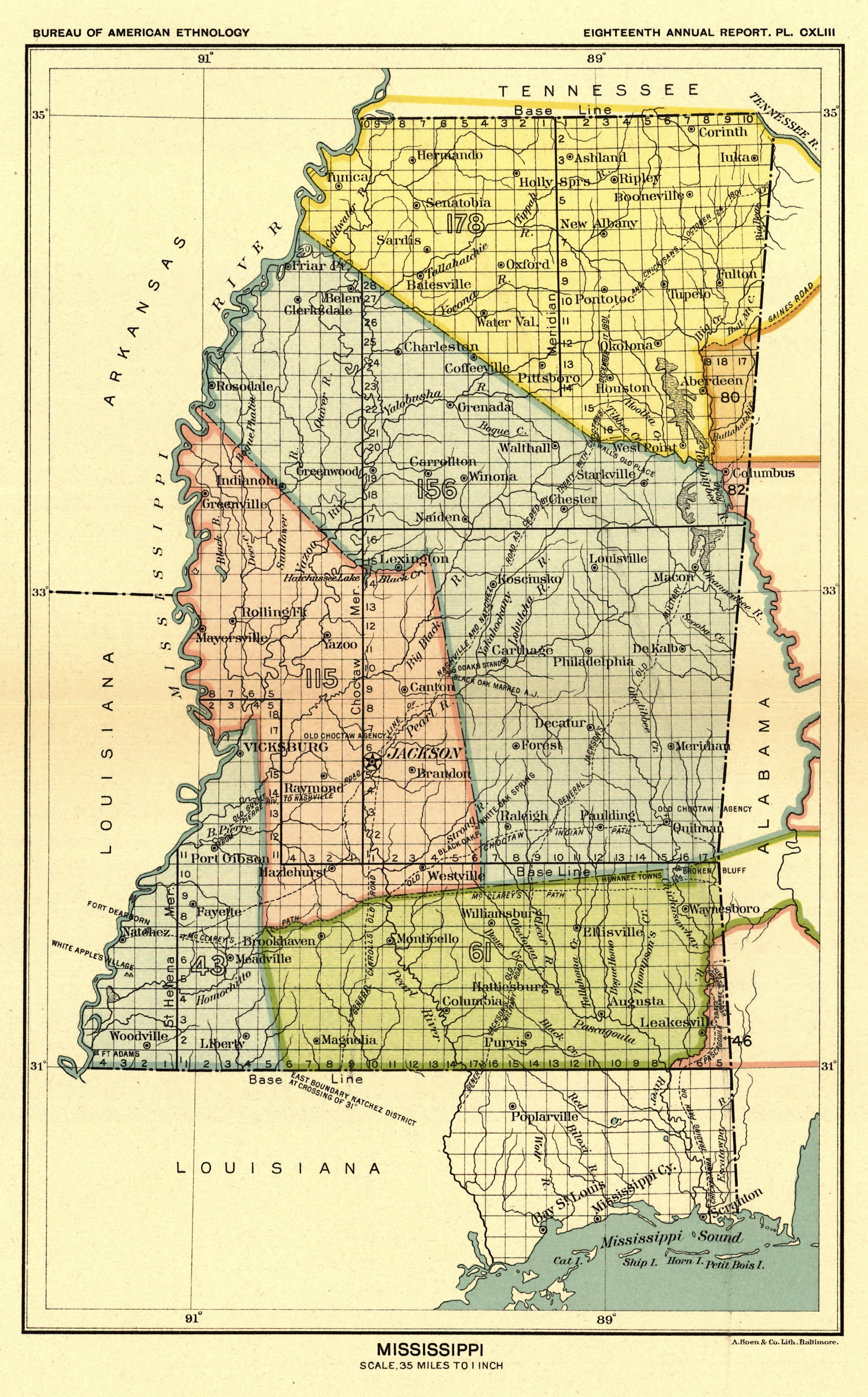
Andrew Jackson Jr.'s Coahoma County plantation was located on land that had been ceded under the Treaty of Dancing Rabbit Creek, ratified in 1831

In adulthood, Junior's financial follies forever caused follow-on problems for the patriarch. For instance, in 1833, "Junior purchased a female slave, Rachel, and her child...but failed to pay the full amount, leading the seller, George Hibb, to press the president for the funds. Jackson sent his son a harsh letter, asking why the $800 that the sale of a horse had generated was not 'sufficient to pay for the wench and child.' Junior excused his behavior because he needed extra money to cover the cost of travel and illness." In 1832, President Jackson wrote Junior criticizing him for allowing the overseer, Steele, for buying too many plows, which the president deemed indulgent and uneconomical, and wrote the overseer about Junior that "it appears that he don't take the least pride or feel the least interested in the farm or anything there pertaining." Decades after his death, Junior's daughter Rachel Jackson Lawrence described her father as "a man of most quiet tastes and resting quite content as a Southern gentleman of the old school," and told a reporter that, "the disposition of Andrew Jackson was retiring, and he cared nothing for the glories and honors of the outer world, but delighted in quiet strolls over his extensive estates, with his gun in hand and followed by his faithful pointers. The political arena possessed no charms for him, but he delighted himself in domestic pursuits and was devoted to his family."

In 1833, Jackson wrote his son about his young but growing family, "...you must now live for them and their prosperity, and in all your course through life remember that if you do anything injurious to your fame it will tarnish theirs..." After 1833 Jackson's letters until his death in 1845 repetitively, helplessly beseech his son to be more financially responsible. Historian Mark Cheathem comments:

In addressing Junior's financial troubles, Jackson found himself in a position familiar to that of other southern patriarchs. He had trained Junior to be dependent on him, never trusting him with total autonomy while serving as president. Therefore, Junior never stood alone or learned from his own mistakes. His inability to become a successful 'planter-patriarch' highlighted one of the ironies of southern society noted by historian Michael Johnson: 'The nature of their fathers' estates and ideals caused sons to be constantly tempted by idleness, a state combining subordination and autonomy in near paralysis.' Ever the protective patriarch, Jackson seemed unwilling to allow Junior to suffer the effects of his bad choices, thereby undermining his desire to see his son become independent."

After a devastating fire at the Hermitage in 1834, Sarah and the children went to stay at the White House while repairs were being completed, and Andrew Jackson wrote Junior back home:

Rachel said to me, grandpa the great fire burned my bonnet and a big owl tried to kill Poll, [the Hermitage parrot] but papa killed the owl.

The owls that lived at the Hermitage were a constant threat to the chickens, Andrew Jackson wrote home reminding the slaves to keep an eye on them.

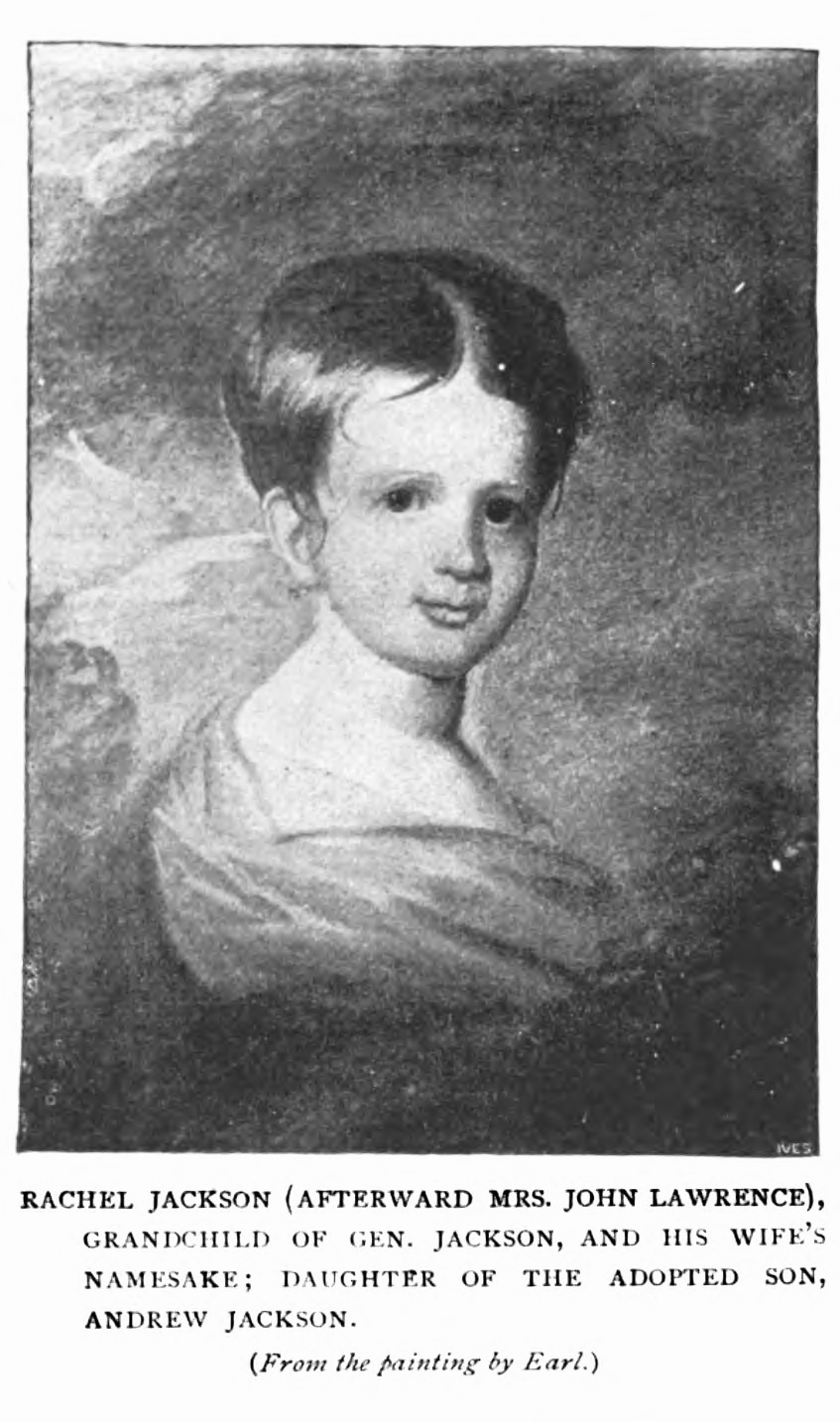
Rachel Jackson Lawrence, Jackson's granddaughter, painted during Jackson's presidency

In 1835, grandpa President Jackson, son, daughter-in-law, and grandchildren vacationed together at the Rip Raps, at the president's expense. At the end of Jackson's presidency, his personal finances were in ruins, and he sold some land to get himself out of debt and cover another $7,000 owed by Jackson Jr. In 1838 Jackson Jr. bought a $23,700 plantation in Coahoma County, Mississippi, on credit. In 1840 Jackson discovered that Junior owed another previously unrevealed $12,000 in debt. Jackson repeatedly asserted that the debts were not Junior's fault but that his son had been exploited by false friends and "some of the greatest scamps, shysters and swindlers that honest and unsuspecting youth was ever surrounded with," and he excused Junior for lying about it by declaring that his son had taken only a "momentary refuge" in dishonesty.

Former president Jackson visited the riverfront Halcyon Plantation in 1840, and then sent down a gristmill so corn could be processed on site for meal for the slaves. He also sent his son enslaved woodcutters to turn the forest into steamboat fuel; Jackson expected that each woodcutter could create two cords of wood a day and he wanted to send 10 woodcutters, with the goal of making $6,000 a year. Steamboats of the era were fueled by wood, and burned something like 70 cords of wood per day. Therefore, there were "hundreds of wood yards" along the Mississippi during the steamboat era, "one every several miles on the busiest sections of the river."

By 1841, after the depression triggered by the Panic of 1837, both the Hermitage and Halcyon Plantation in Mississippi were in visible disrepair because all available funds were going to debt service. Jackson eventually borrowed $10,000 from Francis Blair to pay off some creditors but the vicious cycle of debt continued. Seventy-something Jackson liquidated his stable of thoroughbred racehorses to raise funds to pay Junior's creditors; Jackson thanked Blair for the loan by sending Blair's daughter a filly named Emuckfau, after a battle of the Creek War in which forces commanded by Jackson were victorious.

The Jacksons' Mississippi land flooded incessantly, while hail and freak frosts destroyed both subsistence crops and cotton seedlings; Jackson's projections of wood production were vast overestimates—the enslaved woodcutters were producing less than half of Jackson had expected. The overseer wrote Jackson complaining that Junior was neglecting the property and the slaves, leaving him and his wife (who had nine children of their own) to make clothes for the slaves and to nurse them when they were sick (rather than providing for a doctor). One historian concluded, "Working conditions in such circumstances must have been horrendous, and most of the work was performed by slaves whose voice never appears in the letters." A letter written in the 1840s by a woman who lived at nearby Moon Lake, which was north along the river in Coahoma County, told of "'copper colored water' from shallow wells which had an unpleasant taste and which was blamed for many of the chills and fevers which plagued the people. She also complains of the swarms of mosquitoes and of oppressive summer heat followed by cold, wet winters."

According to Junior's biographer Linda Galloway, "By February, 1844 the Jacksons were forced to look for a purchaser for the Halcyon place. Andrew Junior had closed the woodyard [at the riverfront steamboat landing]; he had been urged to do so by his overseer who promptly opened his own fueling station on some nearby property." As of 1845, Junior's debts totaled US$45,000 (equivalent to $1,554,911 in 2025) plus interest, and the former president died with $16,000 (plus interest) in debts incurred to buy Halcyon. The president's estate was valued at $150,000; the 100 slaves attached to the property composed the vast majority of the value of the estate, with the 1200 acres of land being the remainder. Junior eventually sold Halcyon and the slaves that worked the land to clear some of his debts.

He later owned two other Mississippi plantations, both in Hancock County near the Gulf of Mexico: Sea Song plantation, and Clifton plantation. They bought Sea Song in 1857, with assistance from J. F. H. Claiborne and other local planters. The house burned down almost immediately and a replacement was not completed until 1859. The family sold the property in 1861 and moved to New Orleans.

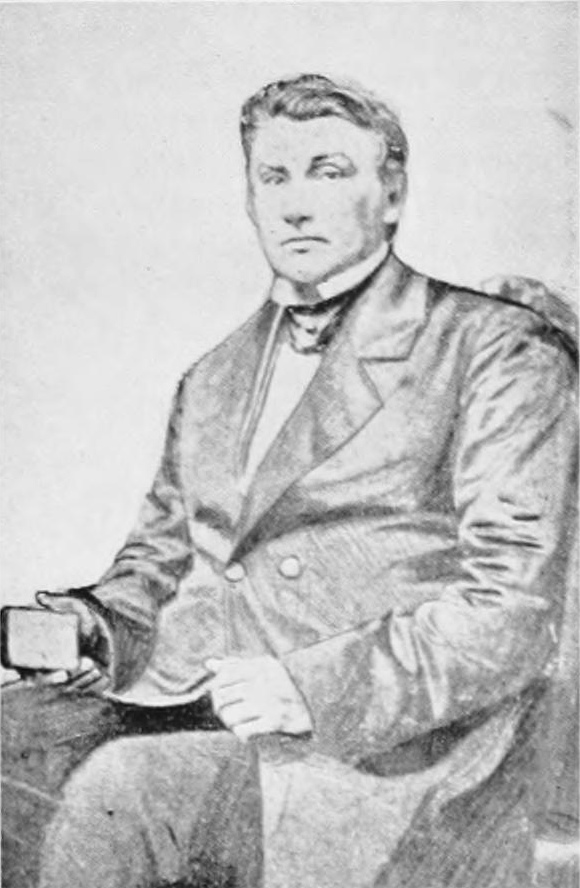
Magazine reproduction of a daguerreotype of Junior made c. 1855

At the time of the 1850 U.S. census, Junior was the legal owner of 137 slaves resident in Tennessee. In 1851 Junior bought an ironworks in Kentucky, and it promptly caught fire and burned to the ground, costing Junior almost $7,000 to repair. He sold the ironworks in 1854 but per Galloway, "needed money so he sold 37 Negroes and hired out about fourteen more to work for the purchasers at the furnace," and he remained in debt. He also acquired money-losing lead mines in Kentucky. By 1855, per Galloway, "This man who had inherited $150,000 from his father in 1845 was...about $100,000 in debt," and the family was in imminent danger of foreclosure on the Hermitage. Slaves were sold for cash to bridge the financial gap, and in 1858 the family sold the Hermitage to the state of Tennessee with a two-year leaseback, a court decision saved Junior from some $25,000 in lead-mine debts, and Blair and John C. Rives covered another $10,000 of the outstanding debts and were never repaid. When the American Civil War came in 1861, Junior declared as a Southern Unionist but his sons fought for the Confederacy; one died from wounds received at Chickamauga. Andrew Jackson Jr. accidentally shot himself while hunting in 1865, shattering his arm. He died a week later of lockjaw.

== See also ==
- Charles Adams (1770–1800) – Son of John Adams (1770–1800)
- Robert Johnson (Tennessee) – Son of Andrew Johnson (1834–1869)
- Donelson family
  - A. J. Hutchings
  - Stockley D. Hays
  - Samuel J. Hays
- William Terrell Lewis

== Sources ==
- Cheathem, Mark R. (2014). Andrew Jackson, Southerner. Baton Rouge, Louisiana: Louisiana State University Press. ISBN 978-0-8071-5099-3. LCCN 2012049695. OCLC 858995561. Project MUSE book 26506.
- Duncan, Georgena (2010). ""One negro, Sarah... one horse named Collier, one cow and calf named Pink": Slave Records from the Arkansas River Valley". The Arkansas Historical Quarterly. 69 (4): 325–345. ISSN 0004-1823. JSTOR 23046604.
- Galloway, Linda Bennett (1950a). "Andrew Jackson, Junior". Tennessee Historical Quarterly. 9 (3): 195–216. ISSN 0040-3261. JSTOR 42621045.
- ——— (1950b). "Andrew Jackson, Junior (Continued)". Tennessee Historical Quarterly. 9 (4): 306–343. ISSN 0040-3261. JSTOR 42621053.
- Gismondi, Melissa (June 12, 2017). Rachel Jackson and the Search for Zion, 1760s–1830s (PhD, History thesis). Charlottesville, Virginia: University of Virginia. doi:10.18130/v3q364.
- Henderson, T. R. (July 2014). "The Destruction of Littafuchee, and a Brief History of American Settlement". Alabama Review. 67 (3). Alabama Historical Association. University of Alabama Press: 233–253. doi:10.1353/ala.2014.0028. ISSN 2166-9961. OCLC 1007553588. Project MUSE 552367.
- Meredith, Rachel (May 2013). "There Was Somebody Always Dying and Leaving Jackson as Guardian": The Wards of Andrew Jackson (M.A. History thesis). Murfreesboro, Tennessee: Middle Tennessee State University. ProQuest 1538368.
- Remini, Robert V. (1977). Andrew Jackson and the Course of American Empire, 1767–1821. New York: Harper & Row. ISBN 978-0-8018-5912-0. LCCN 77003766. OCLC 1145801830.
- Serme, Jean-Marc (2003). "Stormy Weather at Andrew Jackson's Halcyon Plantation, in Coahoma County, Mississippi, 1838–1845". Revue française d'études américaines (98): 32–47. doi:10.3917/rfea.098.0032. ISSN 0397-7870. JSTOR 20874927.
- Snyder, Christina (2017). "Andrew Jackson's Indian Son: Native Captives and American Empire". In Garrison, Tim Alan; O'Brien, Greg (eds.). The Native South: New Histories and Enduring Legacies. Lincoln: University of Nebraska Press. pp. 84–106. doi:10.2307/j.ctt1q1xq7h.9. ISBN 978-0-8032-9690-9. JSTOR j.ctt1q1xq7h.9.
