= Mark R. Cheathem =

American historian (b. 1973)

Mark R. Cheathem is an American historian and editor of the presidential papers of Martin Van Buren. The papers consist of 13,000 documents of Van Buren's life and presidential administration; the papers project is a joint initiative of Cumberland University, the National Historical Publications and Records Commission, the Tennessee General Assembly, and the University of Virginia. Cheathem is a professor of history at Cumberland University in Lebanon, Tennessee. His writing focuses on 19th-century American political history. His 2013 Andrew Jackson, Southerner draws on his observation that most extant Andrew Jackson biographies failed to examine the importance of Southern plantation culture in influencing his life choices and worldview. His 2018 book The Coming of Democracy was awarded a Phi Alpha Theta History Honors Society book award. The election of 1844 book argues that James K. Polk's narrow victory accelerated the coming of the American Civil War.

Cheathem did undergrad at Cumberland, a master's degree at Middle Tennessee State University, and earned his Ph.D. at Mississippi State University. His thesis at MSU became the biography of Andrew Jackson Donelson.

== Works ==
- Cheathem, Mark R. (2007). Old Hickory's nephew: the political and private struggles of Andrew Jackson Donelson. Southern biography series. Baton Rouge: Louisiana State University Press. ISBN 978-0-8071-3238-8.
- Cheathem, Mark R., ed. (2008). Jacksonian and antebellum age: people and perspectives. Perspectives in American social history. Santa Barbara, Calif: ABC-CLIO. ISBN 978-1-59884-017-9.
- Ballard, Michael B.; Cheathem, Mark R., eds. (2013). Of times and race: essays inspired by John F. Marszalek. Jackson: University Press of Mississippi. ISBN 978-1-61703-639-2.
- Cheathem, Mark R. (2013). Andrew Jackson, Southerner. Baton Rouge, Louisiana: Louisiana State University Press. ISBN 978-0-8071-5099-3. LCCN 2012049695. OCLC 858995561. Project MUSE book 26506.
- Cheathem, Mark R. (2015). Andrew Jackson and the rise of the Democrats: a reference guide. Guides to historic events in America. Santa Barbara, California: ABC-CLIO, LLC, an imprint of ABC-CLIO, LLC. ISBN 978-1-61069-406-3.
- Cheathem, Mark R.; Corps, Terry (2017). Historical dictionary of the Jacksonian era and Manifest Destiny (2nd ed.). Lanham: Rowan & Littlefield. ISBN 978-1-4422-7320-7.
- Cheathem, Mark R. (2018). The coming of democracy: presidential campaigning in the age of Jackson. Baltimore: Johns Hopkins University Press. ISBN 978-1-4214-2597-9.
- Cheathem, Mark R. (2022). "'It Has Caused Me Considerable Embarrassment and Not a Little Pain': The Ruptured Relationship of Martin Van Buren and James K. Polk". In Cohen, Michael David (ed.). James K. Polk and His Time: Essays at the Conclusion of the Polk Project. University of Tennessee Press. pp. 111–134. doi:10.2307/jj.26248852. ISBN 978-1-62190-660-5.
- Cheathem, Mark R. (2024). Who is James K. Polk? the presidential election of 1844. American presidential elections. Lawrence, Kansas: University Press of Kansas. ISBN 978-0-7006-3574-0.

=== Papers ===
- Cheathem, Mark R. (April 2011). "Andrew Jackson, Slavery, and Historians". History Compass. 9 (4). John Wiley & Sons: 326–338. doi:10.1111/j.1478-0542.2011.00763.x. ISSN 1478-0542.
- Cheathem, Mark R. (October 2011). Slavery, Kinship, and Andrew Jackson's Presidential Campaign of 1828 (PDF). Southern Historical Association Annual Meeting. jacksonianamerica.com. Archived (PDF) from the original on August 22, 2024.
- Cheathem, Mark R. (October 2012). The Evolution of the Enslaved Community at Andrew Jackson's Plantations, 1790s–1840s (PDF). 2012 BrANCH (Association of British American Nineteenth Century Historians). jacksonianamerica.com.
- Cheathem, Mark R. (2019). "The Stubborn Mythology of Andrew Jackson". Reviews in American History. 47 (3): 342–348. doi:10.1353/rah.2019.0062. ISSN 1080-6628.
