= Battle of Tallushatchee =

1813 battle of the Creek War

- Part of the Creek War
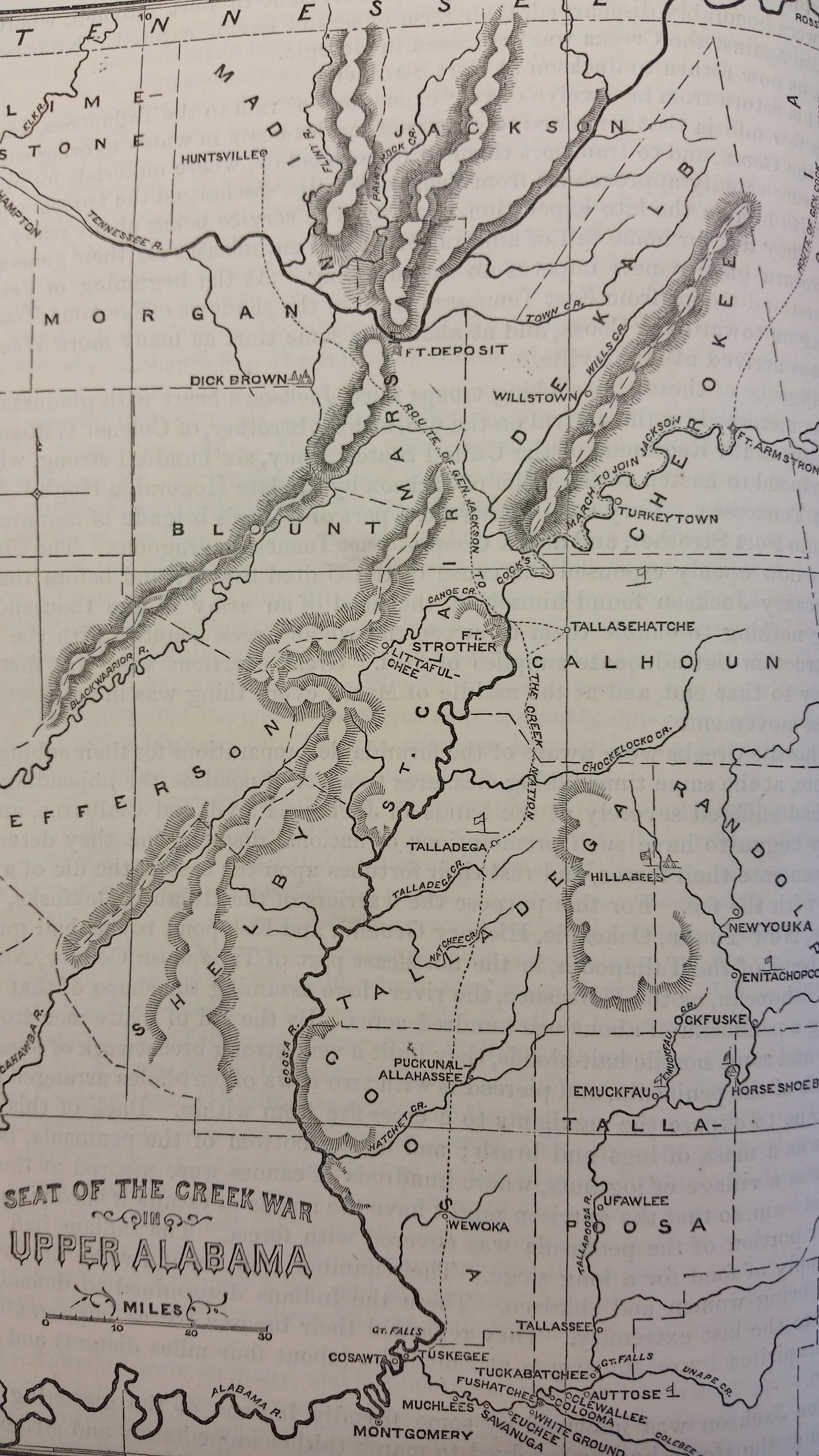
- Map of Alabama during the War of 1812
Date	November 3, 1813 (212 years ago)
Location	Northeastern Mississippi Territory (near present-day Alexandria, Alabama) 33°48′44.4″N 85°54′24.94″W
Result	United States victory

Belligerents
Red Sticks	United States

Commanders and leaders
Unknown	(United States) John Coffee

Strength
Unknown	~900 dragoons

Casualties and losses
186 killed, Unknown wounded	5 killed, 41 wounded
- Location in Alabama

The Battle of Tallushatchee was fought on November 3, 1813, in northeastern Mississippi Territory (near present-day Alexandria, Alabama) during the Creek War. United States dragoons, commanded by Brigadier General John Coffee, defeated the Red Sticks.

== Background ==
After the massacre at Fort Mims, General Andrew Jackson assembled an army of 2,500 Tennessee militia. Jackson began marching into Mississippi Territory to combat the Red Stick Creeks. Jackson's troops began to construct Fort Strother along the Coosa River. 15 miles (24 km) away from the fort lay the Creek village of Tallasseehatchee, where a sizeable force of Red Stick warriors were. Jackson ordered his friend and most trusted subordinate, General John Coffee, to attack the village.

== Battle ==
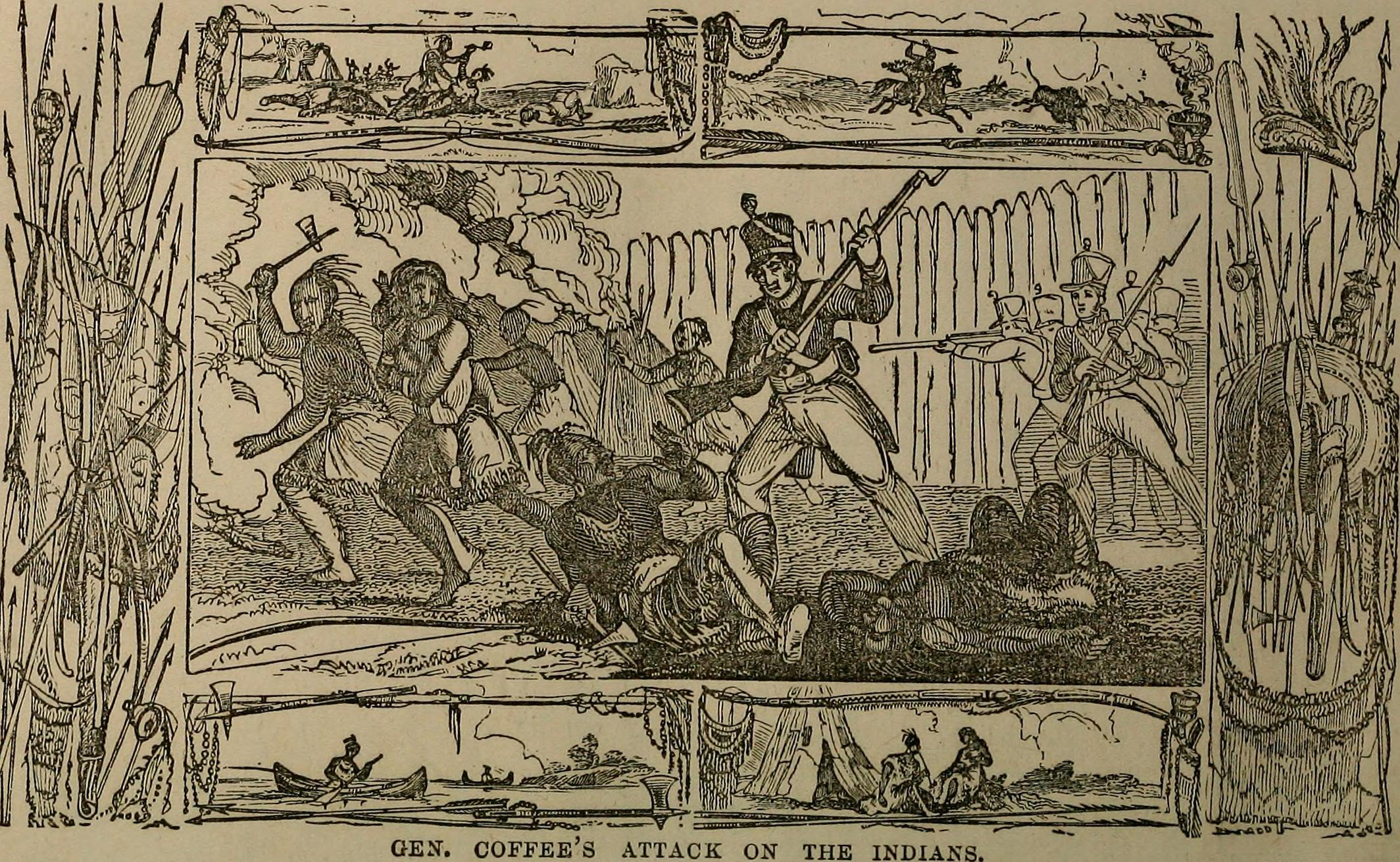
General Coffee attacks the Indians

Coffee took about 900 dragoons and arrived on November 3 at the village, where he divided his brigade into two columns that encircled the town. Two companies ventured into the center of the circle to draw out the warriors. The trap worked: The warriors attacked and were forced to retreat back into the buildings of the village. Coffee closed the circle in on the trapped warriors.

Davy Crockett, serving in the Tennessee Militia, commented, "We shot 'em down like dogs." In his memoirs he also described participating in burning down a house where 46 Creek warriors and their families had taken refuge.

Coffee's forces killed 186 warriors, as well as many women and children, while suffering only 5 dead and 41 wounded.

Writing about the event years later, Richard K. Call recalled:

"The next morning after our march we entered the Indian village, and here I first saw the carnage of the battle field. I saw it in its worst aspect – when the hour of danger had passed, when I could excite no feeling or passion in my breast, to control my sympathy and sorrow for human suffering. It was to me a horrible and revolting scene – the battle had ended in the village, the warriors fighting in their board houses, which gave little protection against the rifle bullets or musket ball. They fought in the midst of their wives and children, who frequently shared their bloody fate. They fought bravely to the last, none asking or receiving quarter, nor did resistance cease until the last warrior had fallen. Humanity might well have wept over the gory scene before us. We found as many as eight or ten dead bodies in a single cabin, sometimes the dead mother clasped the dead child to her breast, and to add another appalling horror to the bloody catalogue – some of the cabins had taken fire, and half consumed human bodies were seen amidst the smoking ruins. In other instances dogs had torn and feasted on the mangled bodies of their masters. Heartsick I turned from the revolting scene. Very different seems the picture in the cool moment of inaction than in the excitement of battle – in the one – passion, the desire to triumph, and vengeance make demons, in the other as the brain becomes more composed, the pulse to beat less quickly, the heart resumes its sway – and it would be a relief to shed tears over the carnage around us – I remember an instant of a brave young soldier, who after fighting like a tiger until the engagement was over, fainted at the sight of the blood he had helped to spill."

This battle was the first battle in General Andrew Jackson's military campaign. A week later, General Jackson inflicted another serious defeat on the Red Sticks at the Battle of Talladega.
