= Andrew Jackson and slavery =

Aspect of U.S. history

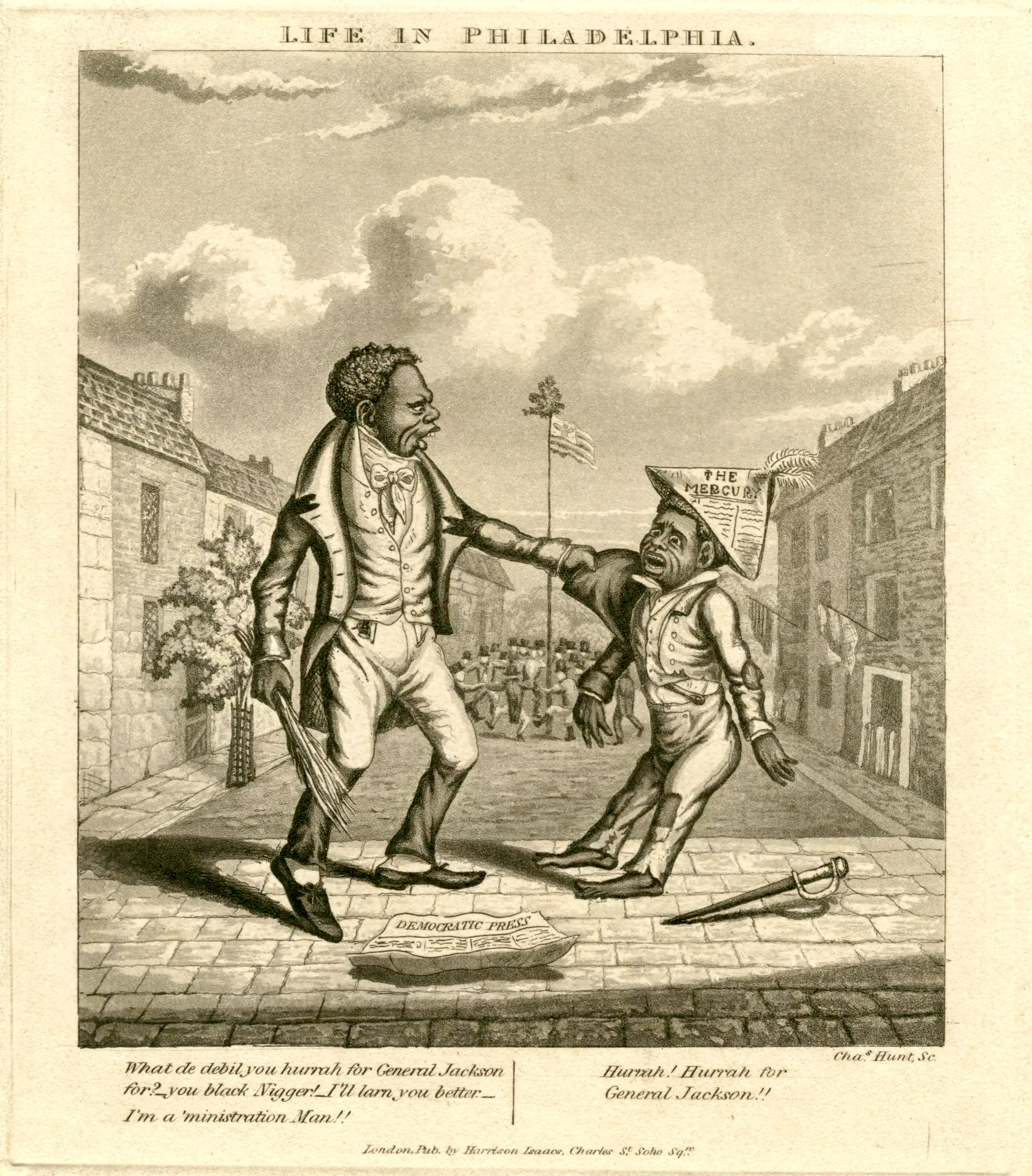
"What de debil you hurrah for General Jackson for?" says a Black man holding a bundle of switches; in the distance men in top hats dance around a flag-topped hickory pole. Jackson partisans erected hickory poles in "communities large and small," while campaign operatives sold Jackson-themed "trinkets such as snuff boxes, ribbons, and Jackson tokens of metal and wood, hickory preferred for the latter, of course." (Charles Hunt c. 1831, Library Company of Philadelphia 7659.F)

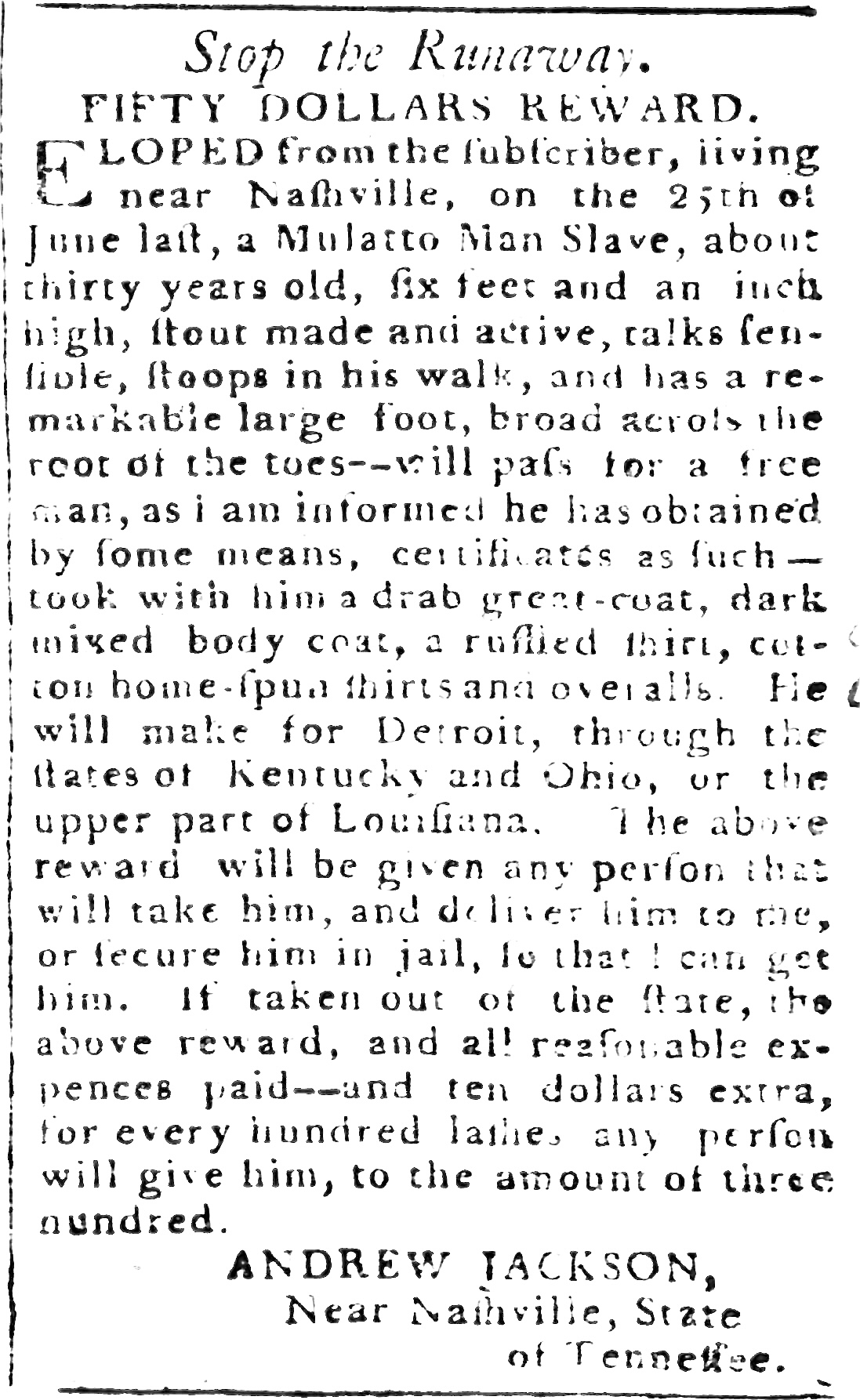
"Stop the Runaway. Fifty Dollars Reward." Andrew Jackson offered to pay extra for more violence (The Tennessee Gazette, October 3, 1804)

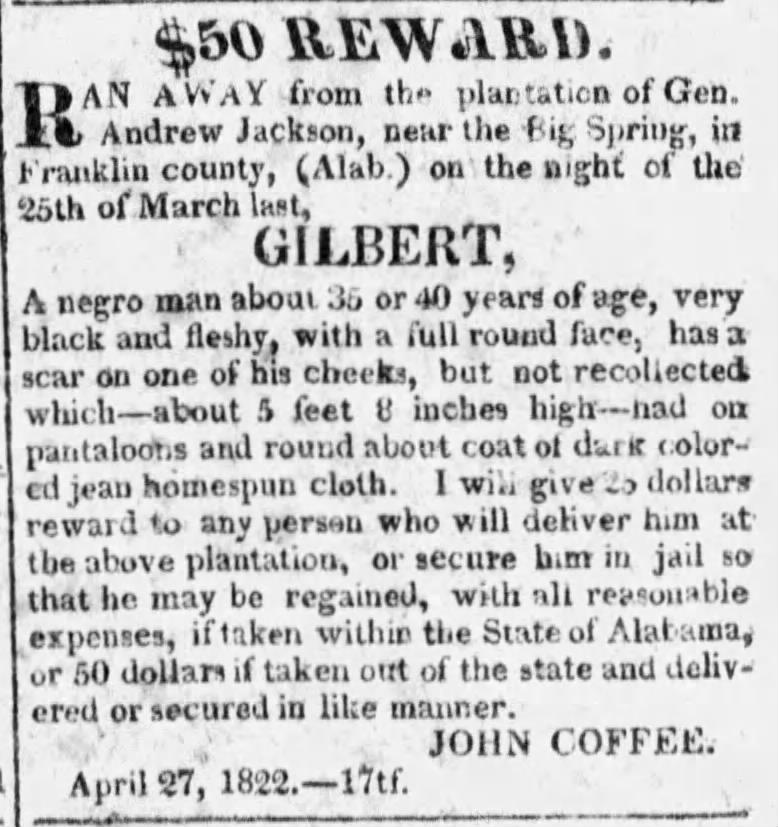
In 1822, John Coffee offered a $50 reward for the return of Gilbert, who had run away from Jackson's plantation near present-day Tuscumbia, Alabama); Gilbert was killed by an overseer in 1827, which became a campaign issue in the 1828 presidential election

Andrew Jackson, the seventh U.S. president, was a slave owner and slave trader. Unlike previous slaveowning presidents Thomas Jefferson and George Washington, Jackson "never questioned the morality of slavery." Existing records show that Jackson and his immediate heirs owned 325 slaves between 1788 through 1865. Jackson personally owned 95 people when he was first sworn in as the U.S. president and 150 at the time of his death in 1845. Only 0.1% of southern slaveowner families owned 100 or more slaves at the time of the American Civil War.

== Slave trade ==
Jackson was active in the interregional slave trade, transporting people by boat from the Cumberland River district of Tennessee to the Natchez District of Mississippi. In 1811 a Choctaw Indian agent, Silas Dinsmore, theoretically tried to enforce a prohibition on trafficking slaves through Choctaw territory. According to his political opponents, Jackson declared his intention to disregard this law, ranting, "I am no kidnapper. I am no slave. I want no passport. I am a freeman, and if I cannot pass freely with my property, my rifle and my pistols wilt pass me; they have never yet failed me; and while I have strength of arm to use them, they never will?"

== Plantations ==
Jackson owned at least seven plantations over his lifetime, three in the Nashville area, three in Alabama, and another owned jointly with his son in Mississippi. The most famous of these is the Hermitage, which had 150 slaves at the time of Jackson's death. When General Lafayette made his tour of the United States in 1824–25, he visited the Hermitage and his secretary recorded in his diary, "General Jackson successively showed us his garden and farm, which appeared to be well cultivated. We everywhere remarked the greatest order, and most perfect neatness; and we might have believed ourselves on the property of one of the richest and most skilfull of German farmers, if, at every step, our eyes had not been afflicted by the sad spectacle of slavery."

During his presidency, the Hermitage all but fell to ruin, and Jackson's slaves suffered the consequences. According to a history of agriculture in early Tennessee, "Jackson had, beginning in 1795, an overseer; and all his race horses were fed and trained and cared for by other men. He managed very well—as long as Rachel lived to manage for him. The frantic, yet always hopeful letters to his adopted son during his second term as President, though coming long past this period, demonstrate too well the problem of the absentee owner on the Cumberland, trying to keep a plantation going almost entirely on money from the crop...The letters tell a tale of mismanagement and bad judgement...Neighbors wrote Jackson of Negroes sick and several dead, one suspects from brutality and ill treatment in general from the overseer, for there was no Rachel around to oversee the overseer...There is something infinitely pathetic about Jackson, honest, patient—a strange role for Jackson—old, watching the ruin of everything he had worked for all his life."

Jackson and his son Andrew Jackson Jr. bought a plantation in Coahoma County, Mississippi called Halcyon. Halcyon was managed by overseer J. M. Parker.

Jackson also owned 640 acres of former Creek lands in Alabama "south of the Tennessee on the Military road between the river and big spring."

According to historian Mark Cheathem, between 1804 and 1827, "at least ten male slaves ran away from plantations owned by or under Jackson's control."

=== Slave quarters ===
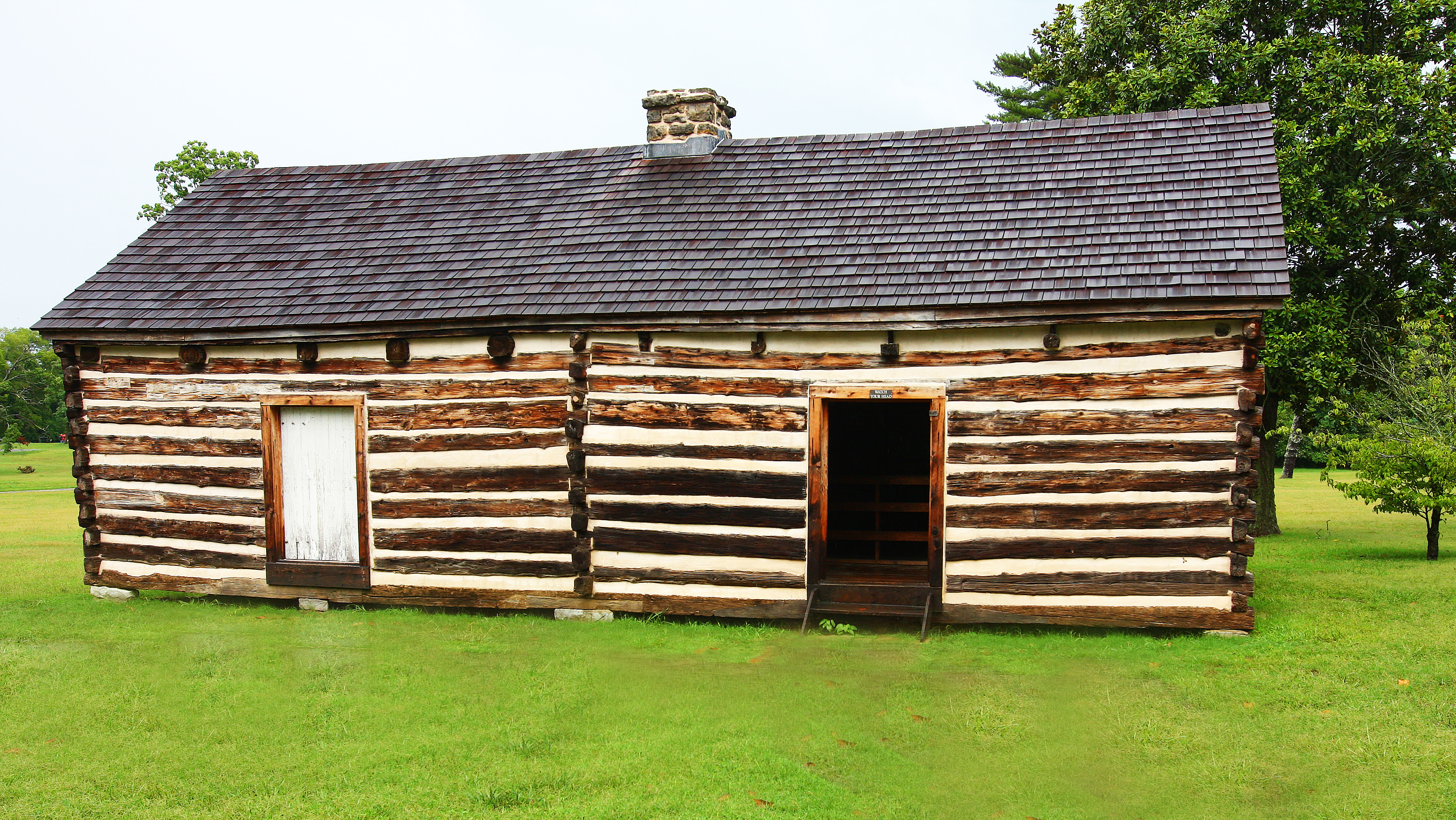
The former slave quarter and freedman's cabin of Alfred Jackson at the Hermitage.

A visitor to the Hermitage described the slave quarters there: "Each family had a one-story frame house that was painted either white or red, and with it about an acre of ground, all fenced in with palings or board fence and whitewashed; and around each of these houses were a lot of fruit trees and shrubbery." Archaeologists have identified three separate "slave quarters" at the Hermitage: "the work yard just north of the mansion" was primarily inhabited by the house slaves, while cabins near "the First Hermitage and Field Quarter areas" were inhabited by a combination of skilled mechanics and agricultural laborers.

=== Hermitage slave cemetery ===
The Hermitage's long-lost slave cemetery was rediscovered in 2024 after decades of investigation. Ground-penetrating radar identified 29 graves (although that is not necessarily equivalent to the number of burials). The cemetery is located about 1,000 feet (300 m) northwest of the mansion.

== Fugitives ==
Andrew Jackson is known to have placed at least three runaway slave ads, one for "a mulatto Man Slave" in 1804, and one for Gilbert in 1822. Researcher Bill Carey reported that of 1200 runaway slave ads he reviewed for his 2018 history of slavery in Tennessee, Jackson's 1804 ad—which offered "ten dollars extra, for every hundred lashes any person will give him, to the amount of three hundred"—was the only one where a slaveholder offered a financial incentive for the beating of a slave. A third ad appeared in the Nashville Review in December 1809, seeking the return of Oston, who was described as literate, and a skilled coachman, seamster, and gardener. Oston had already escaped Jackson once, at which time he "made it all the way to the Ohio River."

The year before the 1828 U.S. presidential election, pioneering American abolitionist Benjamin Lundy republished news items suggesting that Andrew Jackson had been a slave trader in his younger days, commenting, "I shall be slow to believe that General Jackson would at this day be guilty of carrying on the 'lawful business' of men-dealing, although it is strongly commended by high authority in Maryland. It may be, that the following circumstance gave rise to the suspicion entertained by the Kentuckian. Some years since, a gentleman, residing near the mouth of the Ohio river, informed me that a slave belonging to General Jackson having absconded, was taken up and committed to jail (if I mistake not) in Alabama. The General got word of it, and went for him. After identifying him, he took him out of the jail, tied him to a joist, in a blacksmith-shop, and gave him a very severe flogging. He then took him home. This case has often been related in Kentucky, and possibly magnified so as to give rise to the statement relative to the General's connection with the slave trade." The Jackson papers show that he expended time and effort on the problem of Tom Wid, George, and Osten, all three of whom, at one time or another made an effort to no longer be enslaved under the purview of Andrew Jackson. Historian Mark Cheathem believes George (b. c. 1770) was likely an estate slave inherited by Rachel Jackson from her father and who was once bitten by a snake; despite Andrew Jackson chasing him around for a while he ultimately made it to New Orleans from whence he disappeared.

== Violence ==
According to Anita Goodstein's study of frontier-era Nashville black history, Jackson was "furious when his wife's maid [laundered] clothes for people outside the family. He ordered that she be taken to the public whipping post and given fifty lashes should she try to do it again." Jackson was apparently strongly opposed to the possibility that his slaves might hire themselves out and earn money independent of his control. In 1822, while Jackson was in Alabama, four slaves escaped from his possession in Tennessee. These people were recaptured, and subsequently Jackson wrote his ward/nephew/political protégé Andrew Jackson Donelson, "although I hate chains, was compelled to place two of them in irons, for safe-keeping untill an opportunity offers to sell or exchange them-so soon as I have leisure I shall give you my ideas on the subject submitted to you for your opinion."

On the question of "irons" Jackson had been given a platform for sharing his perspective on the discipline and punishment of subordinates when the U.S. Army issued a statement about the prevalence of desertion and what might be done to ameliorate the problem, including improving conditions for the soldiery. Jackson, as Major General of the Division of the South, issued a statement on July 21, 1821, saying that issue was command weakness and the solution was more whipping and less chaining, writing (spelling and orthography is as written by Jackson):

The government must annex an adequate & certain punishmt <for> to the crime of desertion, and, experience compels me to say it, although at varience with the more refined & sensative feelings of the day must restore corporeal punishment in the regulations for the government of the army, as it formerly existed, and as it now exists in the navy, or desertion & insubordination will still increase. But it is said to be dishonorable; why should it be more so in the army, than in the Navy? Is it more dishonorable to receive twentyfive stripes and be or dered to immediate duty, than to be manacled with Chains for months & years, an object of disgust to every freeman who sees him, more properly an appendage of ancient despotism, than any thing belong ing to republican institutions? Let the deserter in time of peace, for the first offence receive thirty nine stripes, for the second double that number, and for the third let him feel the highest penalty of the law. I will venture to say that a few examples will put an end to that extraordinary frequency of desertion which at present prevails, and the cause of which, has been so unjustly imputed "to an undue severity, or to the absence of system in the conduct of officers towards their men["]

The number of "39 stripes" (meaning 39 strikes with the whip or the cat o' nine tails or the paddle) comes from the Bible, Deuteronomy 25:3, "He may be flogged with forty lashes, but no more." This number was codified into black codes and other statues throughout the United States.

== Key slaves ==
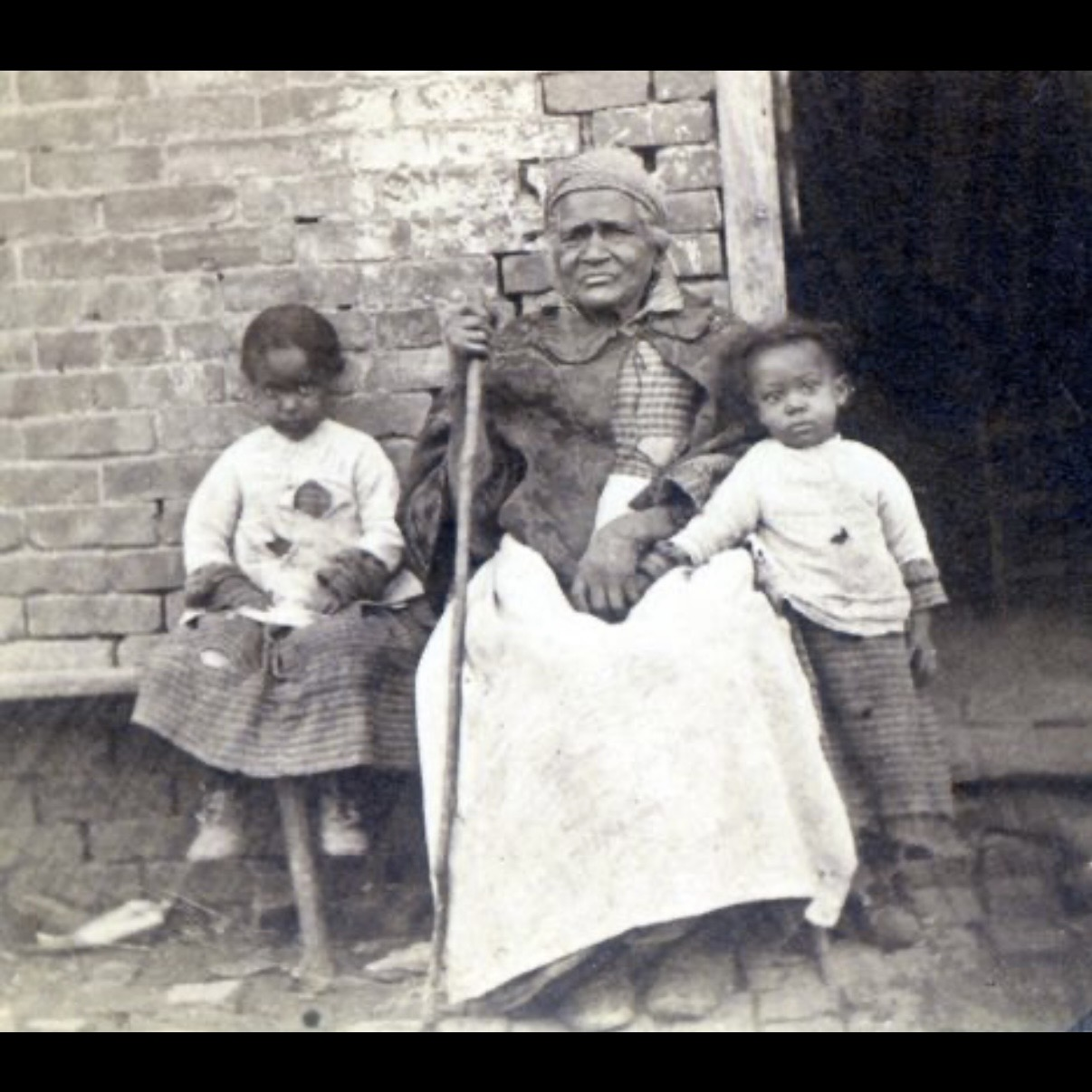
Photographer Carl Giers took this photograph of a formerly enslaved woman (believed to be Betty Jackson) and two children, possibly her great-grandchildren, at the Hermitage in 1867; 27-year-old Andrew Jackson bought 24-year-old Hannah and her "child called Bet" from Charles Carter on July 8, 1794, for "the consideration of eighty pounds Virginia currency," when Betty was about a year old (Hermitage Historic Collection, University of Tennessee Libraries)

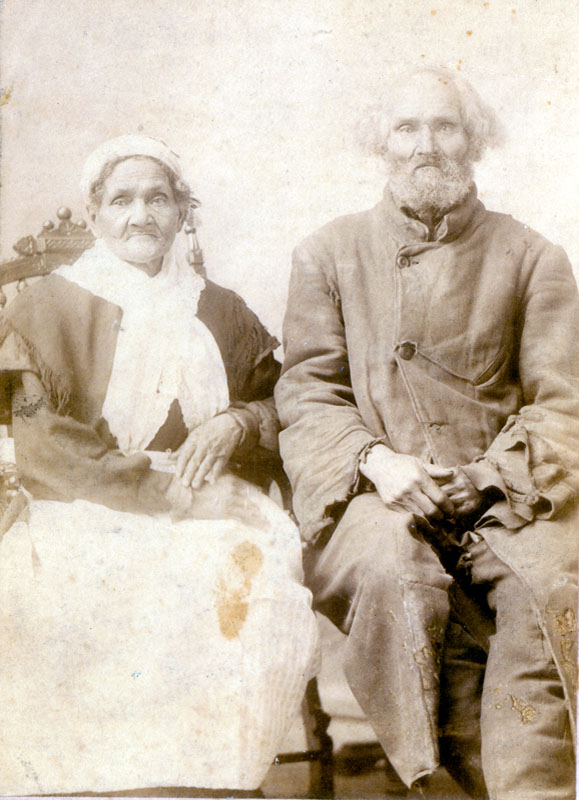
Hannah and Aaron Jackson, both formerly enslaved at the Hermitage. Photograph taken in 1865.

- Nancy was the first Andrew Jackson slave for whom written records exist; he bought her from Micajah Crews in November 1788 in Washington County, North Carolina, he was 21, her age was estimated to be about 18 or 20. No one knows what happened to Nancy; she could have been sold (the weeks after Christmas were high season for slave sales to plantation owners, especially before the coming of steamboats). She could have been killed, run away, died of illness. It would have been unusual for a frontier gambler and lawyer to buy a female slave for use as a personal body servant.
- Dinwiddie, known as Dunwoody, born c. 1773, purchased 1806, worked as a trainer in Jackson's stables until Jackson's death. Dinwiddie and a famous horse named Truxton were both available for lease from the Jacksons.
- John Fulton played violin and was sent to out to other plantations to provide music for parties. Another Hermitage slave played banjo. Fulton was employed at Vanderbilt after emancipation.
- Hannah Jackson, born 1792 or 1801, purchased around 1808, initially served as a companion for Rachel Jackson, then later as the head of the enslaved domestic household at the Hermitage. This woman is known as "House Hannah," not to be confused with Betty Jackson's mom "Old Hannah" (1770–1846) or "Ingen Hannah".
- Aaron Jackson, born c. 1785, was a blacksmith at the Hermitage and husband of Hannah Jackson. The couple had ten children together. Andrew Jackson bought six-year-old "Aron" in 1791 in Sumner County as a lone child without parents.
- Nancy, born c. 1790, was purchased alongside three of her daughters, her son, and her granddaughter, during Jackson's presidency after her daughter Nellie, a free black chef working in the White House, asked him to do so to prevent her family from being split up.
- Jackson bought "a certain negro man slave Dick" from Henry Buckler on August 1, 1803. The sale receipt was annotated "in an unidentified hand: Diningroom servant at the Hermitage." Jackson paid $450 for 22-year-old Dick.
- Charles helped Dunwoody with the horses and was with Jackson in New Orleans in 1814 and aided General Jackson in his duties for the U.S. Army from 1817 to 1819. Charles probably worked at the White House at least part time during Jackson's presidency.
- Jame (also known as Jim and James) was Jackson's "military servant" from 1815 to 1817. He was married to "Ingen Hannah."
- In 1838, George, Alfred, Frank, and Squire were charged with murder in the death of Frank, who was owned by Stockley Donelson. Jackson spent an estimated $1,500 on good defense attorneys for the four men. The jury rendered a verdict of not guilty.

== Taxable slaves (1825) ==
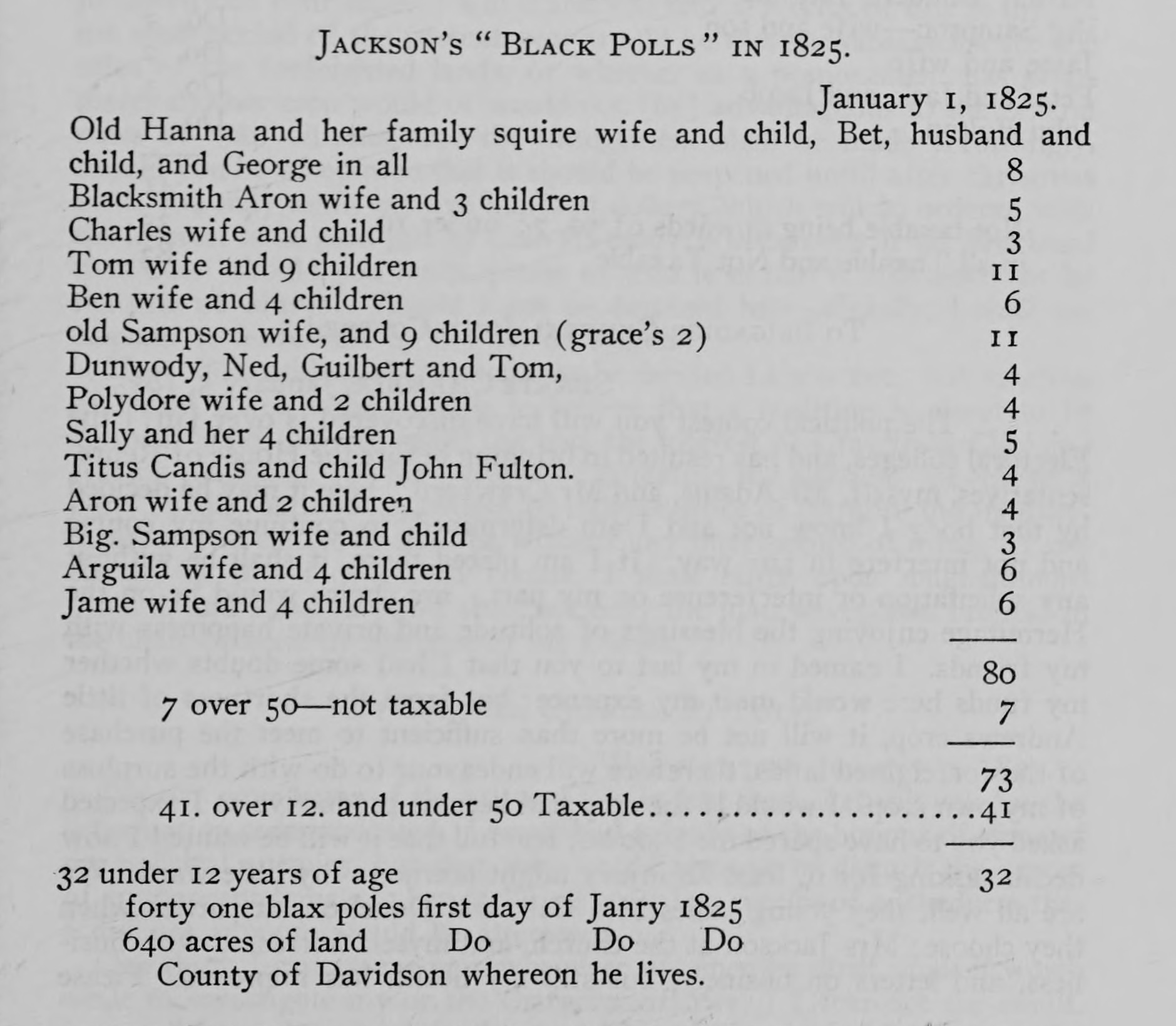
Version one, 1825 lists of taxable slaves from John Spencer Bassett's Correspondence, volume III

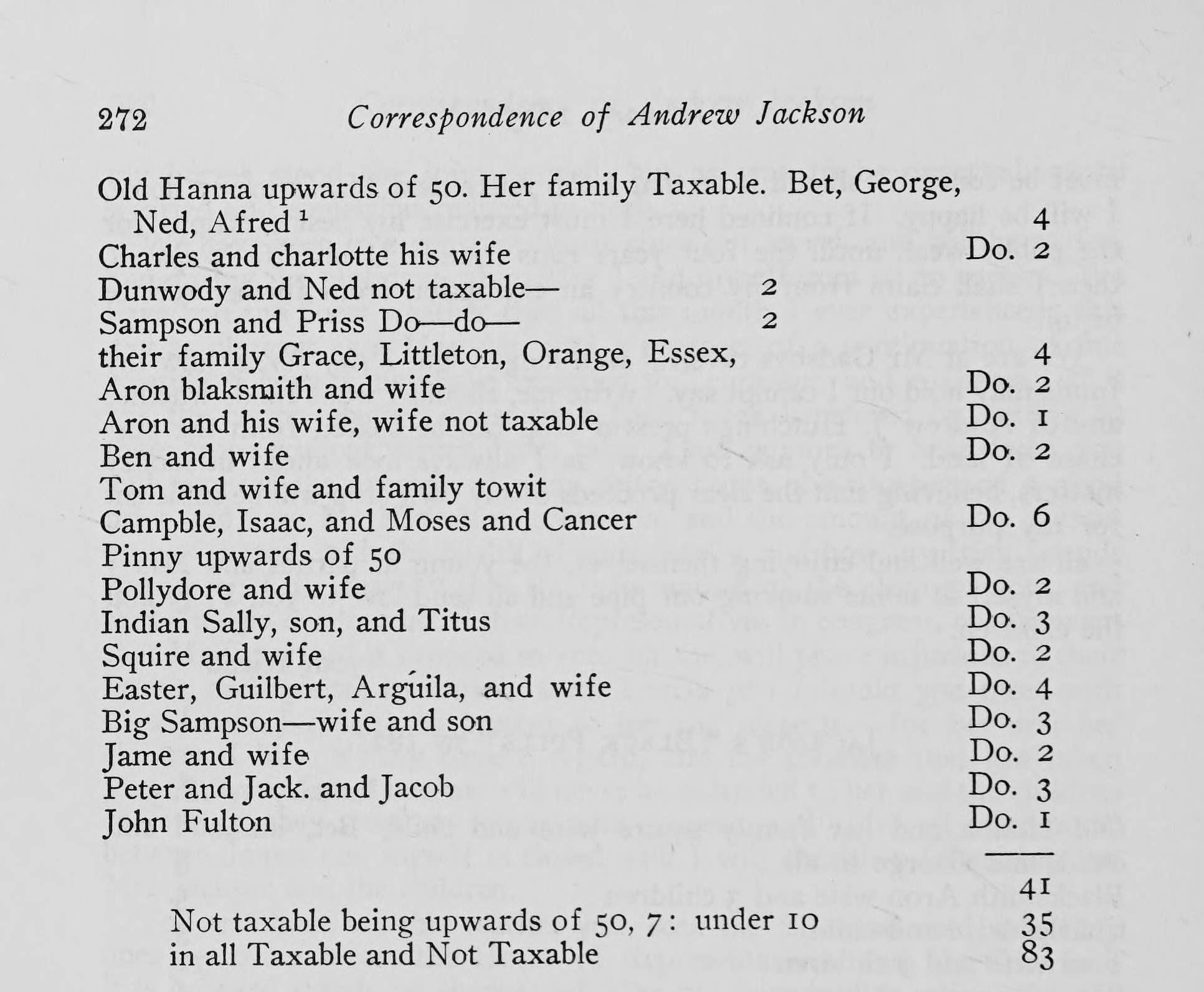
Version two

Jackson wrote up a list and a revised list of taxable enslaved property held at the Hermitage during the 1824 tax year. There are other lists of Hermitage slaves but the 1825 list is the only one written in Jackson's handwriting. In 1824 Jackson legally owned 80 people. Volume six of The Papers of Andrew Jackson, edited at the University of Tennessee at Knoxville and published 2002, substantially annotates these lists, identifying the children, providing capsule biographies, and listing vital dates.

- Old Hanna & her family squire wife & child, Bet, husband & child, & George in all 8
- Blacksmith Aron, wife & 3 children
- Charles wife & child
- Tom wife & 9 children
- Ben wife & 4 children
- old Sampson wife, & 9 children (grace's 2)
- Dunwody, Ned, Guilbert & Tom
- Polydore wife & 2 children
- Sally & her 4 children
- Titus Candis & child John Fulton
- Aron wife & 2 children
- Big Sampson wife & child
- Arguila wife & 4 children
- Jame wife & 4 children

== Other slave transactions ==
The preserved papers of Jackson include many slave sale documents. In 1791 Jackson bought 27-year-old Tom ("formerly Peter") from Turner Williams for £60. In 1793 he bought Peg, "about Twenty Six years old," from William Bowen, and he bought Roele from Thomas Simpson for $150. In July 1794 he paid Charles Carter £80 for Hannah and child Bet. (Note: Not be confused with Bett, child Hannah, and 14-year-old Tom, purchased in September 1794, or Betty and Hannah sold in Natchez in 1800.) He bought Mary from Robert Craig for $233 in September 1794. In June 1797 he paid Ezekiel Douglas $290 for Suck, "about fourteen or fifteen years old," and sold him for the same price to Isaac Bateman in July. Later the same month, on behalf of Jackson, John Hutchings sold Phan, "About the Age of fourteen or fifteen" to Berry Nolin for $300. In February 1805, he made a $215.84 partial payment for Orange and Priss to John M. Garrard Jr. (a nephew of Kentucky governor James Garrard who was involved in horse racing at the Clover Bottom track). In October 1806, Jackson & Hutchings bought Steven from James Stewart. In June 1810 he bought Sucke and her daughter Silvay from future Attorney General of the United States Felix Grundy in separate transactions totaling $600. In December 1810 he bought Elijah from Robert Butler for $525. Also, on December 15, 1810, Jackson bought three slaves for $850 (equivalent to $17,497 in 2025) from fellow lawyer and future U.S. Senator from Tennessee John Williams. The people exchanged in this transaction were Peter, about 30, Rachael, about 26, and "Rachael's male child about the age of one year", all of whom were warranted by the seller to be "sound healthy and sensible." On November 26, 1811, Jackson paid $450 (equivalent to $8,708 in 2025) for a 14-year-old boy named David. The seller was 63-year-old Charles M. Hall who lived near the Clover Bottom. The bill of sale was witnessed by John Coffee.

== War of 1812 ==
According to James Robinson, after Jackson used slaves to fight and win the Battle of New Orleans, he made a speech recanting promises to free the slaves who fought in his command and added, "Before a slave of mine should go free, I would put him in a barn and burn him alive." Some 50 years later, amid the public debate about the formation of African-American military units during the American Civil War, an Ohio newspaper editorialized, "Out, we say, upon that squeamish Democracy that would shield the negro from the privations and dangers of the war! Gen. Jackson, whose Democracy no Democrat, at least, will question, had no scruples about negroes going into the army. They fought like veterans at the battle of New Orleans—(an event that Democrats even now delight to commemorate)—and publicly commended them for their bravery. If it was right that negroes should fight then, what makes it wrong now?"

== Presidency ==
By the 1830s, abolitionism in the United States had become a major reform movement, one often targeted by pro-slavery violence. Federal troops were used to crush Nat Turner's Rebellion in 1831, though Jackson ordered them withdrawn immediately afterwards despite the petition of local citizens for them to remain for protection. Jackson considered the issue of slavery divisive to the nation and to the delicate alliances of the Democratic Party.

Jackson's view was challenged when the American Anti-Slavery Society agitated for abolition by sending anti-slavery tracts through the postal system into the South in 1835. Jackson condemned the abolitionists as "monsters" and said they should die, arguing that their antislavery activism would encourage sectionalism and destroy the Union. The tracts provoked riots in Charleston, and pro-slavery Southerners demanded that the postal service ban distribution of the materials. Jackson responded by directing that antislavery tracts should be sent only to subscribers, whose names could be made publicly known, exposing them to reprise. That December, Jackson called on Congress to prohibit the circulation through the South of "incendiary publications intended to instigate the slaves to insurrection".

== See also ==
- Andrew Jackson and land speculation
- List of presidents of the United States who owned slaves
- List of violent incidents involving Andrew Jackson
- Runaway slaves in Spanish Florida
- Black refugee (War of 1812)

== Sources ==
- Aptheker, Herbert (1974) [1943]. "The Turner Cataclysm and Some Repercussions". American Negro Slave Revolts. International Publishers. pp. 293–394. ISBN 9780717800032. OCLC 1028031914.
- Brands, H. W. (2005). Andrew Jackson: His Life and Times. New York, NY: Knopf Doubleday Publishing Group. ISBN 978-1-4000-3072-9. OCLC 1285478081.
- Breen, Patrick H. (2015). The Land Shall be Deluged in Blood : A New History of the Nat Turner Revolt. Oxford University Press. ISBN 9780199828005. OCLC 929856251.
- Carey, Bill (2018). Runaways, Coffles and Fancy Girls: A History of Slavery in Tennessee. Nashville, Tennessee: Clearbrook Press. ISBN 978-0-9725680-4-3. LCCN 2018903570. OCLC 1045068878.
- Cheathem, Mark R. (October 2012). The Evolution of the Enslaved Community at Andrew Jackson's Plantations, 1790s–1840s (PDF). 2012 BrANCH (Association of British American Nineteenth Century Historians). jacksonianamerica.com. Archived from the original (PDF) on September 12, 2024.
- Cheathem, Mark R. (2014). Andrew Jackson, Southerner. Baton Rouge, Louisiana: Louisiana State University Press. ISBN 978-0-8071-5099-3. LCCN 2012049695. OCLC 858995561. Project MUSE book 26506.
- Dickey, J. D. (2022). The Republic of Violence: The Tormented Rise of Abolition in Andrew Jackson's America. Pegasus Books. ISBN 978-1643139289.
- Goodstein, Anita S. (1979). "Black History on the Nashville Frontier, 1780–1810". Tennessee Historical Quarterly. 38 (4): 401–420. ISSN 0040-3261. JSTOR 42626015.
- Henig, Gerald S. (1969). "The Jacksonian attitude toward Abolitionism". Tennessee Historical Quarterly. 28 (1): 42–56. JSTOR 1901307.
- Jackson, Andrew (1980). Smith, Sam; Owsley, Harriet (eds.). The Papers of Andrew Jackson: Volume I, 1770–1803. University of Tennessee Press. doi:10.7290/utp7943. ISBN 978-0-87049-219-8.
- Jackson, Andrew (1984). Moser, Harold; Macpherson, Sharon (eds.). The Papers of Andrew Jackson, Volume II, 1804–1813. University of Tennessee Press. doi:10.7290/utp3038. ISBN 978-0-87049-441-3.
- Latner, Richard B. (2002). "Andrew Jackson". In Graff, Henry (ed.). The Presidents: A Reference History (3 ed.). New York, NY: Charles Scribner's Sons. pp. 106–127. ISBN 978-0-684-31226-2. OCLC 49029341.
- Maiden, Leota Driver (1958). "Colonel John Williams". East Tennessee Historical Society's Publications. 30. Tennessee Historical Commission, University of Tennessee. Knoxville, Tennessee: East Tennessee Historical Society: 7–46. ISSN 0361-6193. OCLC 1137265. FHL 1345572.
- McFaul, John M. (1975). "Expediency vs. morality: Jacksonian politics and slavery". The Journal of American History. 82 (1): 24–39. doi:10.2307/1901307. JSTOR 1901307.
- Pessen, Edward (1984). The Log Cabin Myth: The Social Backgrounds of the Presidents. New Haven, Connecticut: Yale University Press. ISBN 978-0-300-03166-9. LCCN 83021887. OCLC 10100822. OL 3179305M.
- Remini, Robert V. (1984). Andrew Jackson and the Course of American Democracy, 1833–1845. New York, NY: Harper & Row Publishers, Inc. ISBN 978-0-8018-5913-7. OCLC 1285459723.
