= Plantations of Andrew Jackson =

Andrew Jackson (lifespan, 1767–1845; U.S. presidency, 1829–1837) owned seven plantations over the course of his lifetime. All are believed to have been worked by an enslaved Black labor force, predominantly growing cotton and subsistence crops. Jackson owned three plantations in the vicinity of Nashville, Tennessee, including the landmark Hermitage, and a series of three in the Muscle Shoals section of the Tennessee River in northern Alabama. He backed his son's investment in a steamboat-fuel woodlot and cotton plantation in northwestern Mississippi, facing Arkansas on the shore of the Mississippi River.

== Poplar Grove (1792–1797) ==
Poplar Grove, sometimes called Poplar Flat, was a farm near Nashville where Jackson used "slave labor to cultivate cotton." He bought this land near the Jones Bend of the Cumberland River on February 23, 1792. He sold it on October 18, 1797.

== Hunter's Hill (1796–1804, 1833–1840) ==
Hunter's Hill was a plantation near Nashville where Jackson used "slave labor to cultivate cotton." Jackson paid John Shannon of Logan County, Kentucky $700 for the 640-acre property in March 1796. He sold Hunter's Hill for $10,000, plus livestock, to Edward Ward on July 6, 1804. Jackson repurchased Hunter's Hill in 1833 but sold it in 1840 to help pay debts owed by his son Andrew Jackson Jr.

== The Hermitage (1804–1845) ==
Hermitage spring house, built 1822; the water source, known at one time as Gravelly Spring, remains active; the building is made from blue limestone, which underlies much of the Nashville Basin

Jackson paid Nathaniel Hays $4,500 for the 450-acre Hermitage property on August 23, 1804. The property was ultimately expanded to 2,000-acre holding. The family originally lived in log cabins but eventually built the mansion, the first version of which burned on October 13, 1834, during Jackson's second term as president and six years after Rachel Jackson's death. In 1835, Jackson's nephew Andrew Jackson Donelson built Tulip Grove across the road, originally called the Lebanon Pike, now U.S. Route 70N.

== Melton's Bluff plantation (1816–1827) ==
Melton's Bluff was located on the south bank of the Tennessee River, opposite its confluence with Elk River, in what is today Lawrence County, Alabama. Jackson and his nephew and business partner John Hutchings bought Melton's Bluff, a well-developed cotton plantation, and two slaves, from the bicultural-Cherokee Melton family on November 22, 1816. Hutchings died of illness in 1817. Jackson seemingly moved on to other holdings shortly thereafter, and sold off what remained of his Melton's Bluff holding in 1827.

== Evans Spring plantation (1818–1821) ==
Evans Spring was located on the north side of the Tennessee River, near Florence, Alabama in Lauderdale County. Jackson bought it in March 1818, and sold it to Richard C. Cross for US$7,500 (equivalent to $181,406 in 2025) on September 20, 1821.

== Big Spring plantation (1818–1822) ==
Big Spring was located further west in the Tennessee River valley, in the vicinity of what is now Tuscumbia, Alabama. Jackson bought the Big Spring land in 1818 and 1821. He moved his stock (slaves and animals) there in November 1821. He sold it to Anthony Winston Jr. on November 22, 1822; Winston reported in 1828 that he had paid US$6,976 (equivalent to $187,480 in 2025) for Big Spring.

== Halcyon plantation (1838–1845) ==
Jackson backed the business enterprises of his son Andrew Jackson Jr. including Junior's 1838 purchase of 1,200 acres of riverfront land in Coahoma County, Mississippi. The Halcyon plantation was a debt-soaked and river-flooded disaster that Junior sold four years after his father's death in 1849.

== See also ==
- List of residences of presidents of the United States
- Andrew Jackson and slavery
- Andrew Jackson and the slave trade
- Andrew Jackson and land speculation
- Early career of Andrew Jackson
- Bibliography of Andrew Jackson

== Sources ==
- Cheathem, Mark R. (2013). Andrew Jackson, Southerner. Baton Rouge, Louisiana: Louisiana State University Press. ISBN 978-0-8071-5099-3. LCCN 2012049695. OCLC 858995561. Project MUSE book 26506.
- Jackson, Andrew (1980). Smith, Sam; Owsley, Harriet (eds.). The Papers of Andrew Jackson: Volume I, 1770–1803. University of Tennessee Press. doi:10.7290/utp7943. ISBN 978-0-87049-219-8.
- ——— (1984). Moser, Harold; Macpherson, Sharon (eds.). The Papers of Andrew Jackson, Volume II, 1804–1813. University of Tennessee Press. doi:10.7290/utp3038. ISBN 978-0-87049-441-3.
- ——— (1994). Moser, Harold; Hoth, David; Hoemann, George (eds.). The Papers of Andrew Jackson: Volume IV, 1816–1820. University of Tennessee Press. doi:10.7290/utp8684. ISBN 978-0-87049-778-0.
- ——— (1996). Moser, Harold; Hoth, David; Hoemann, George (eds.). The Papers of Andrew Jackson: Volume V, 1821–1824. University of Tennessee Press. doi:10.7290/utp7345. ISBN 978-0-87049-897-8.
- Lawrence, Stephen S. (1967). "Tulip Grove: Neighbor to the Hermitage". Tennessee Historical Quarterly. 26 (1). Tennessee Historical Society: 3–22. ISSN 0040-3261.
- Marks, Henry (April 1973). "Andrew Jackson's Activities in the Tennessee Valley". Huntsville Historical Review. 3 (2) 4: 27–36 – via M. Louis Salmon Library, University of Alabama at Huntsville.
- McDonald, William Lindsey (1995). "Melton's Bluff: Andrew Jackson's Cotton Plantation at the Muscle Shoals". Essays on the History of the Shoals from Pioneer Days to World War II. The Journal of Muscle Shoals History. 14. Sheffield, Alabama: Tennessee Valley Historical Society: 3–18. ISSN 0094-8039. OCLC 1795446.
