= Hannah Jackson =

Slave of US president Jackson and his wife Rachel

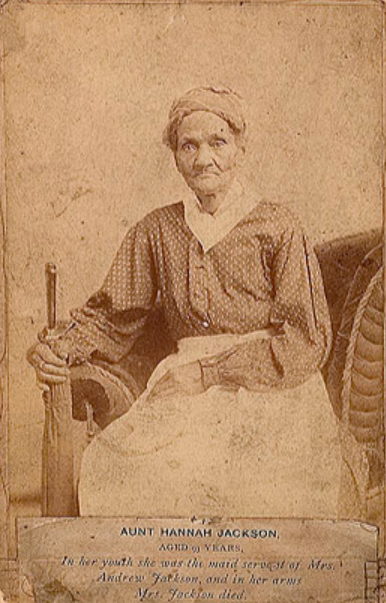
- Jackson c. 1880
- Born: 1792 or 1801
- Died: 1895 (aged 93–94 or 102–103); Nashville, Tennessee, U.S.
- Spouse: Aaron Jackson (m. 1817; d. 1880)
- Children: 10

Hannah Jackson (1792 or 1801 – 1895) was an African American woman who worked as a house slave for the seventh U.S. president Andrew Jackson and his wife Rachel. She was present at both their deaths. She was interviewed twice late in her life for her stories about Jackson and is thought to be the source of some of the stories told about his life.

== Life ==
The year of Hannah's birth is uncertain. It has been given as either 1792 or 1801. She became Jackson's slave around 1808. According to an 1894 interview with Hannah by the Nashville newspaper Daily American, she stated Jackson received her as payment from a client for legal services. In her interviews, Hannah recounts many positive actions by Jackson, saying that he was very kind to her and the other enslaved African Americans. He would occasionally buy her gifts, including a red dress. She also stated that Jackson did not want to split up slave families and would try to keep them together. The Daily American also implies that Hannah may be a source for the story that Jackson was slashed by a British officer when he was a child.

In 1817, she married Aaron, an enslaved blacksmith. They had ten children together, all of whom lived to adulthood. They were married in the Jackson's dining room in the Hermitage. By mid-1820 Hannah had become the head household servant, known as "House Hannah", as there were at least three other slaves called Hannah on the plantation. She became personal servant to Rachel Jackson and was present when Rachel was struck ill. According to Hannah, she was alone with Rachel when she died, holding Rachel's head on her shoulder. It is thought that Hannah is one of the servants who served Jackson in the White House, as the presence of a slave named Hannah was mentioned by Jackson's friend William B. Lewis.

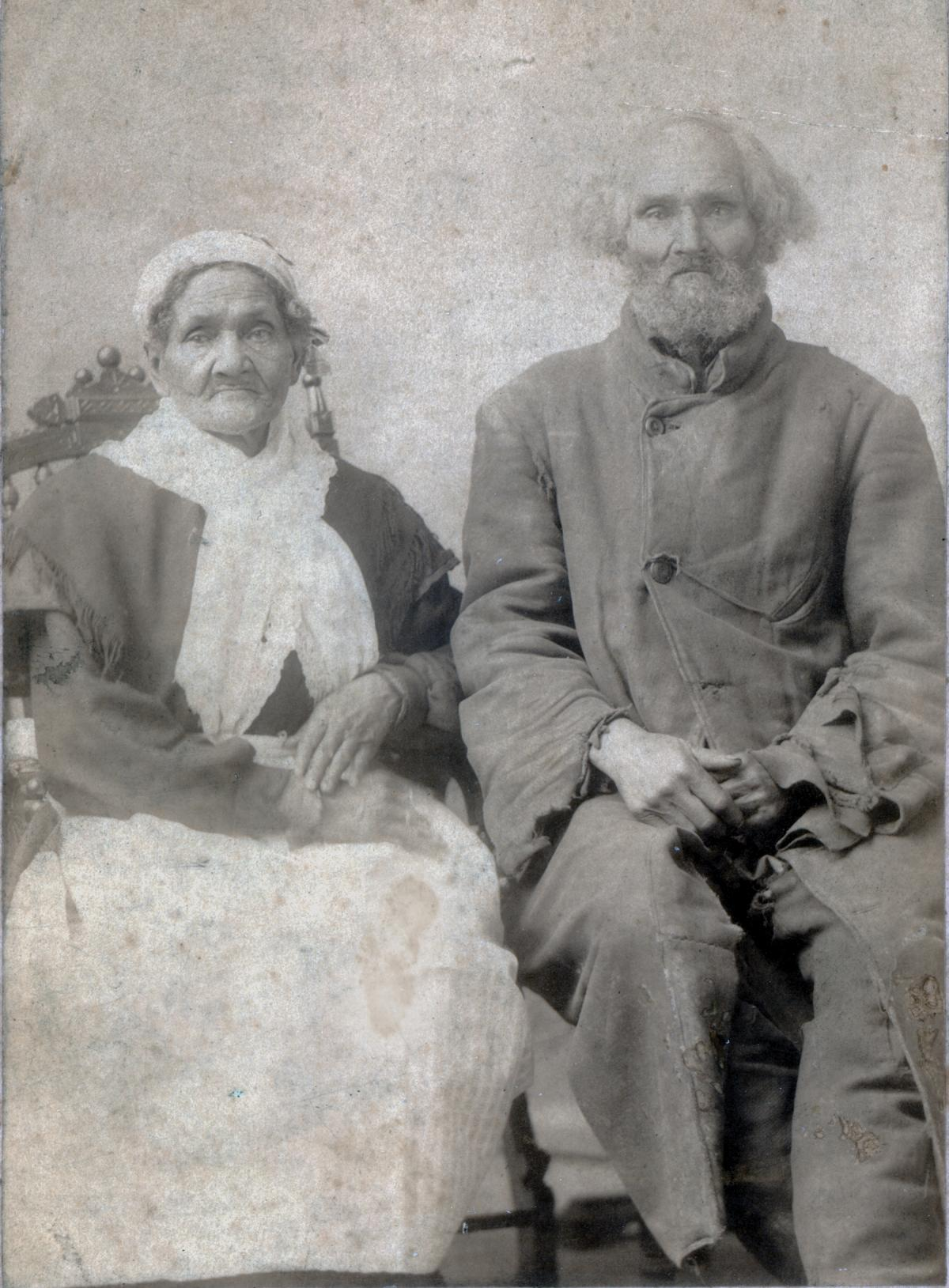
Photograph of Hannah (left) and her spouse Aaron Jackson by Theodore Schleier, (1865, The Hermitage, Tennessee)

When Jackson was dying, Hannah was one of the people beside his death bed to hear his final words. According to James Parton, who was one of Jackson's first biographers and interviewed Hannah about Jackson's death, he said, "Be good children, and we will all meet in heaven". According to the Daily American interview, Hannah quotes him as saying, “I hope to meet you all in Heaven, both black and white". In his will, Jackson bequeathed Hannah and her two daughters, Charlotte and Mary, to Sarah Yorke Jackson, the wife of Jackson's adopted son, Andrew Jackson Jr. Little is known of Hannah's life until 1863, when Hannah escaped to Union forces after Sarah complained about her becoming insolent. Later, one of Jackson's grandchildren complained that Hannah had abandoned the Hermitage, and now was earning $20 a month. After emancipation, she took the surname "Jackson". When she was interviewed by W. G. Terrell for the Cincinnati newspaper, Commercial Gazette in 1880, she was living with three of her children in Nashville, where she died in 1895.

== In popular culture ==
In 2007, Dorothy Price-Haskins wrote a historical fiction novel called Unholiest Patrimony: "The Truth is Great and It Must Prevail. The work is presented as a "novel based on fact" that portrays Andrew Jackson as having a sexual relationship with Hannah, resulting in a daughter, Charlotte. According to Price-Haskins, the novel is based on a journal by Charlotte that remains in private hands. Jackson was not accused of having sex with his slaves during his lifetime and there is no DNA evidence that Jackson had children with slaves; but the novel highlights that exploitation was always a possibility in a slave-owning household. For example, Hannah told a story about one visitor who would use an enslaved woman for sexual pleasure while staying at the Hermitage; although Rachel was enraged, Jackson would plead obliviousness.

== See also ==
- Alfred Jackson (Tennessee)
- Gilbert (Tennessee)
