= Gilbert (Tennessee) =

African-American man enslaved by U.S. president Andrew Jackson, (c.1785–1827)

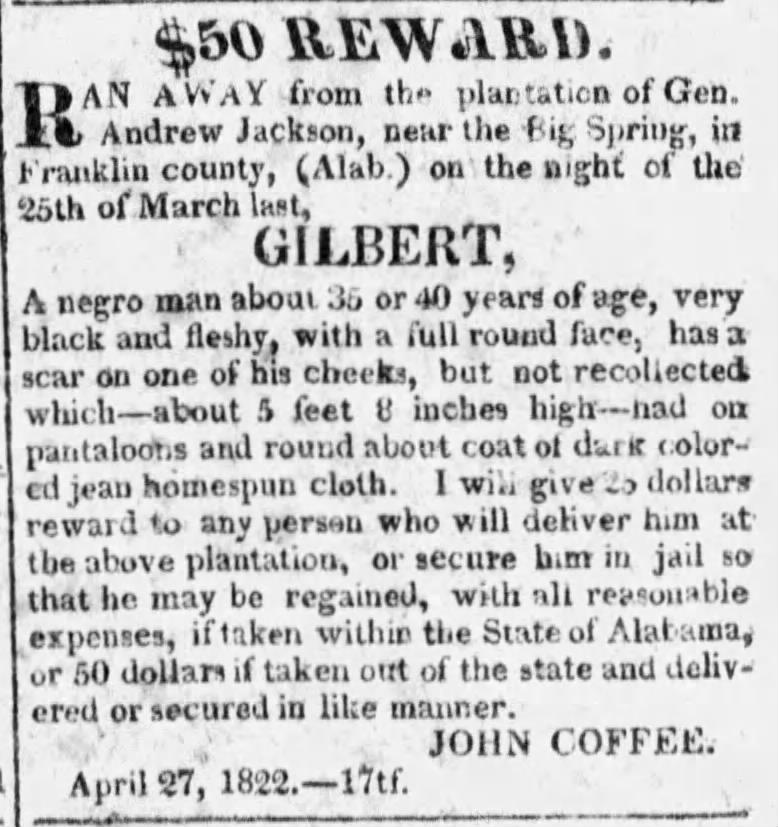
Gilbert escaped from an Andrew Jackson's Big Spring plantation in Alabama in 1822

Gilbert (c. 1785 – August 28, 1827) was an American man enslaved by Andrew Jackson, the 7th President of the United States. One of the affiants in the case of his death described him as a man of "strong sense and determined character." The man who killed him described him as "a very strong, stout man, possessed of a most violent and ungovernable temper and disposition, among many other faults."

Gilbert escaped from Jackson's plantations at least four times. In 1804, John Coffee placed a runaway slave ad seeking his return in the newspaper:

"50 DOLLARS REWARD RAN AWAY from the plantation of Gen. Andrew Jackson...in Franklin County (Ala.)...Gilbert, a negro man, about 35 or 40 years of age, very black and fleshy, with a full round face, has a scar on one of his cheeks, but not recollected which...JOHN COFFEE".

In 1827, after Gilbert escaped once again, he was recaptured. He was to be whipped publicly as a result but was killed while resisting.

"In the course of being brought before the other slaves, Gilbert slipped the ropes that bound his hands. He tried to smash the overseer's head with a piece of wood, but, during the struggle, [overseer Ira] Walton succeeded in stabbing Gilbert with a knife several times, eventually cutting his throat. The wound to the throat was not immediately lethal, but he died shortly after the fight."

Jackson fired Walton after Gilbert's death, and attempted to have him prosecuted. However, two Tennessee grand juries declined to indict Walton for either murder or manslaughter.

Gilbert's death was a political issue in the 1828 United States presidential election; Jackson's political opponents cited it as evidence of his cruelty.

== See also ==
- Hannah Jackson
- Alfred Jackson (Tennessee)
- Andrew Jackson and the slave trade in the United States
