= Charles Hunt (artist) =

19th C. English painter

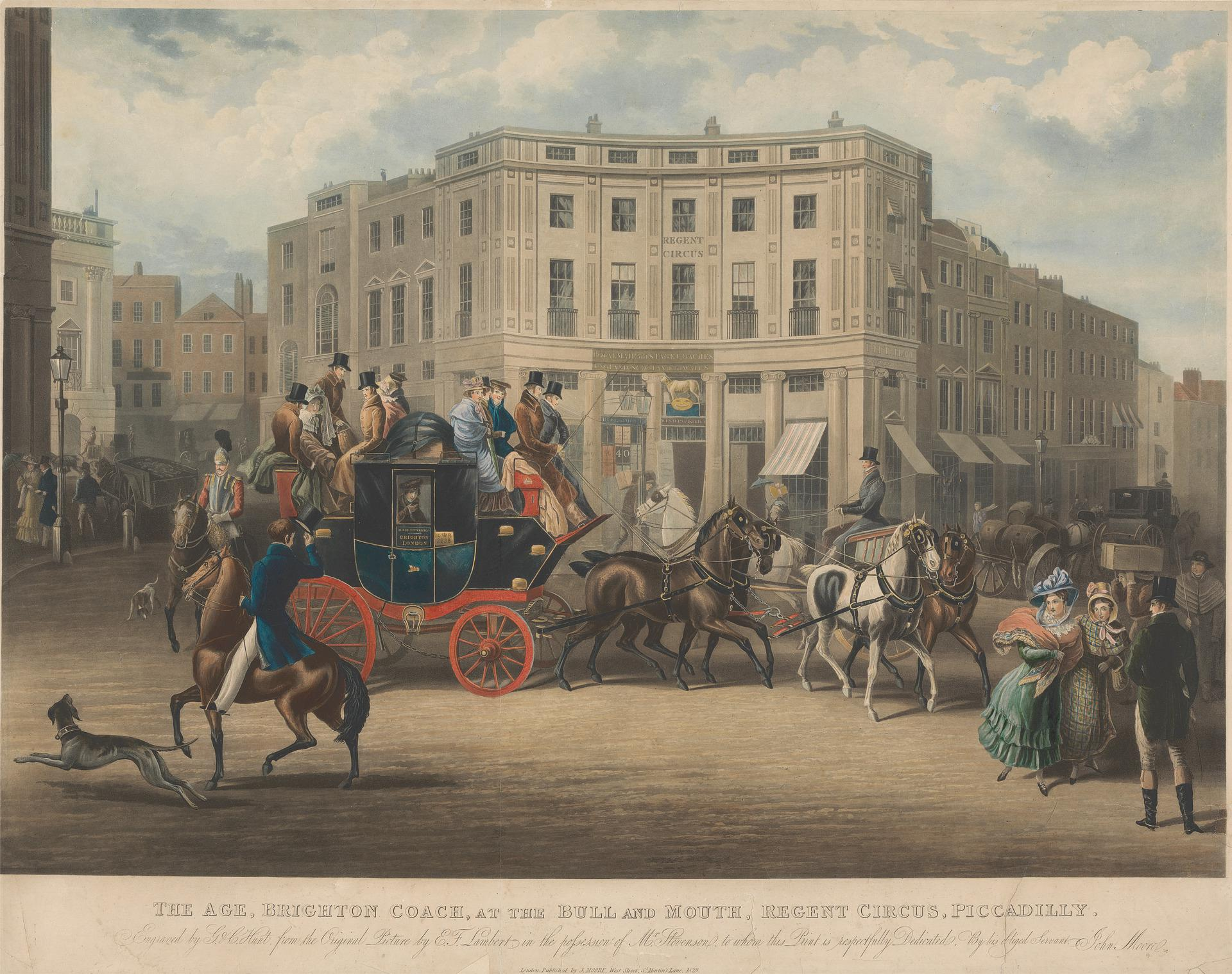
Hunt's 1829 engraving titled The Age, Brighton Coach, at the Bull and Mouth Regent Circus

Charles Hunt (1803 – 15 November 1877) was an English painter. He is known for having painted both historical subjects as well as humorous paintings, especially ones with naughty children.

He was the father of Charles Hunt Jr (1829 to 1900), also a well known painter at the time.
