= Fugitive slave advertisements in the United States =

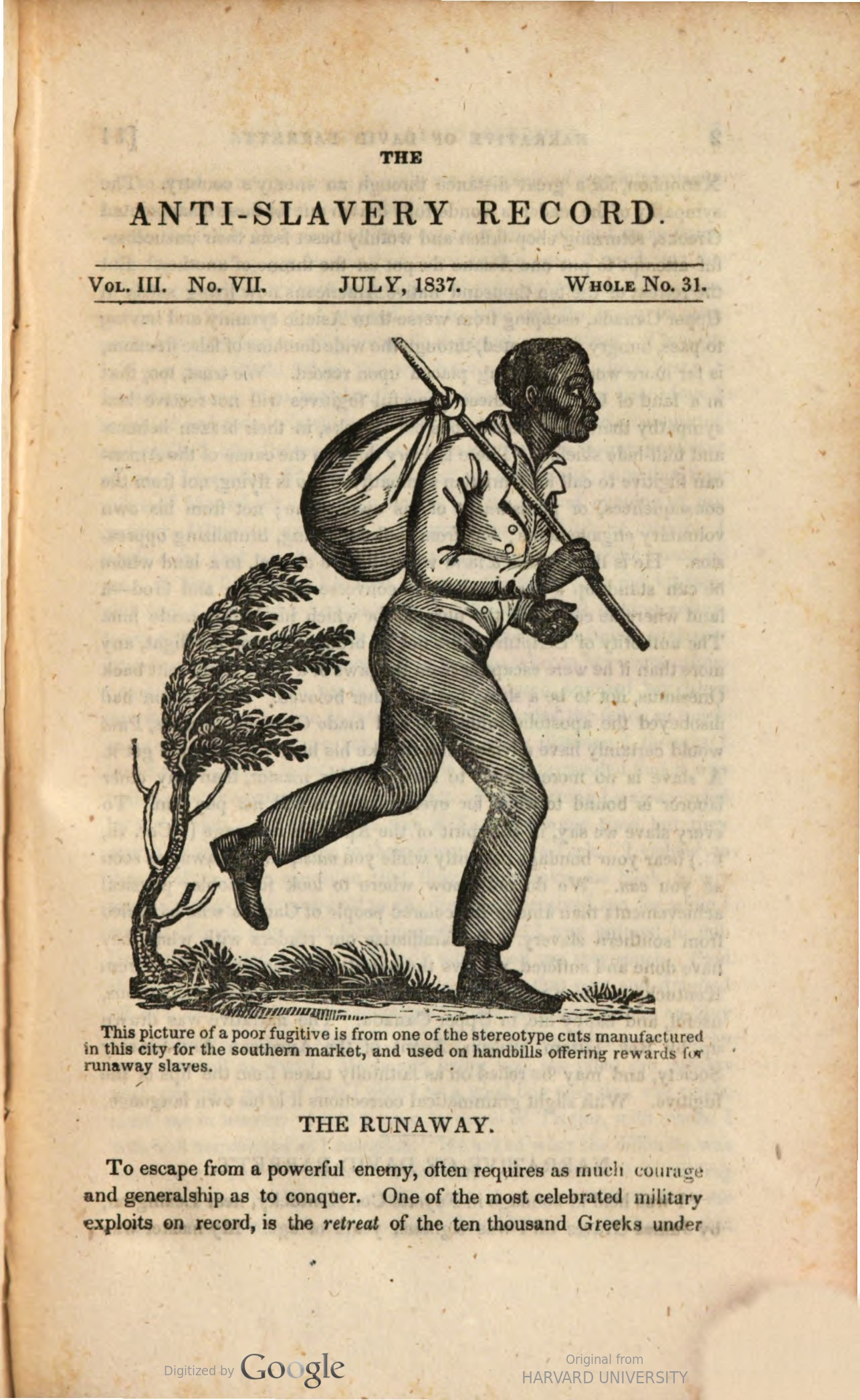
This icon was often placed beside runaway slave ads in 19th-century American newspapers

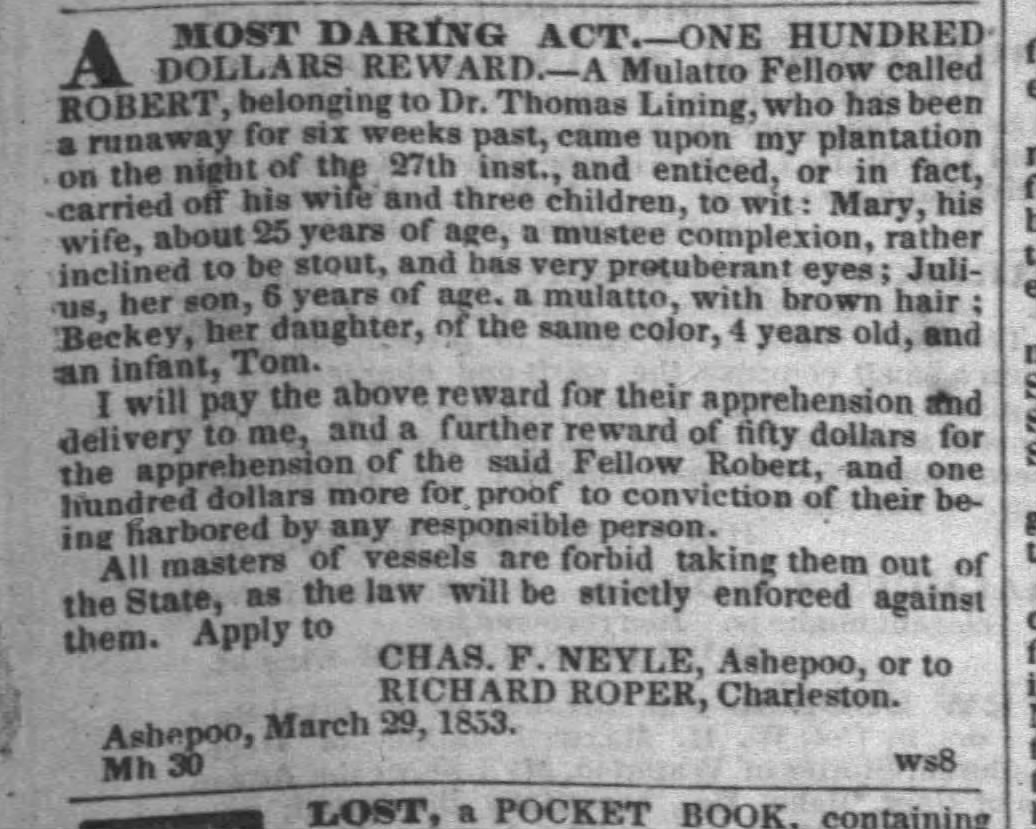
"A MOST DARING ACT" Robert "stole" his own wife, son, daughter and baby from Charles F. Neyle's plantation in South Carolina on the night of March 27, 1853

Fugitive slave advertisements in the United States or runaway slave ads, were paid classified advertisements describing a missing person and usually offering a monetary reward for the recovery of the valuable chattel. Fugitive slave ads were a unique vernacular genre of non-fiction specific to the antebellum United States. These ads often include detailed biographical information about individual enslaved Americans including "physical and distinctive features, literacy level, specialized skills," and "if they might have been headed for another plantation where they had family, or if they took their children with them when they ran."

Runaway slave ads sometimes mentioned local slave traders who had sold the slave to their owner, and were occasionally placed by slave traders who had suffered a jailbreak. Some ads had implied or explicit threats against "slave stealers," be they altruistic abolitionists like the "nest of infernal Quakers" in Pennsylvania, or criminal kidnappers. A "stock character" that appears in countless runaway slave ads is the "unscrupulous white man" who has "no doubt decoyed away" the missing slave; this trope grows out of widespread white southern beliefs about the "essential passivity of blacks."

Harriet Beecher Stowe devoted a chapter of A Key to Uncle Tom's Cabin to examining fugitive slave ads, writing "Every one of these slaves has a history, a history of woe and crime, degradation, endurance, and wrong." She noted that such ads typically include descriptions of color and complexion, perceived intelligence of the slave, and scars or a clause to the effect of "no scars recollected." Stowe also observed the irony of these ads appearing in newspapers with mottos like Sic semper tyrannis and "Resistance to tyrants is obedience to god."

American Baptist, Dec. 20, 1852: TWENTY DOLLARS REWARD FOR A PREACHER. The following paragraph, headed "Twenty Dollars Reward," appeared in a recent number of the New Orleans Picayune: "Runaway from the plantation of the undersigned the negro man Shedrick, a preacher, 5 feet 9 inches high, about 40 years old, but looking not over 23, stumped N. E. on the breast, and having both small toes cut of. He is of a very dark complexion, with eyes small but bright, and a look quite insolent. He dresses good, and was arrested as a runaway at Donaldsonville, some three years ago. The above reward will be paid for his arrest, by addressing Messrs. Armant Brothers, St. James parish, or A. Miltenberger & Co., 30 Carondelet street." Here is a preacher who is branded on the breast and has both toes cut off—and will look insolent yet! There's depravity for you!

— Harriet Beecher Stowe, 1853

Ads describing self-emancipated slaves are a valuable primary source on the history of slavery in the United States and have been used to study the material life, multilinguality, and demographics of enslaved people. Books by 19th-century abolitionist Theodore Weld had a "polemical effect" that was "achieved by his documentary style: a deceptively straightforward litany of fugitive slave advertisements, many of them gruesome in the details of physical abuse and mutilation." Freedom on the Move is a crowdsourced archive of runaway slave ads published in the United States. The North Carolina Runaway Slave Notices Project at the University of North Carolina Greensboro is a database of all known runaway slave ads published in North Carolina between 1750 and 1865.

== Fugitives from the faces on American money ==
Three U.S. Presidents, George Washington, Thomas Jefferson, and Andrew Jackson are known to have placed runaway slave ads, seeking to recapture fugitives "Sandy", Oney Judge, and in the case of Jackson, both "a mulatto Man Slave" in 1804, and Gilbert in 1822.

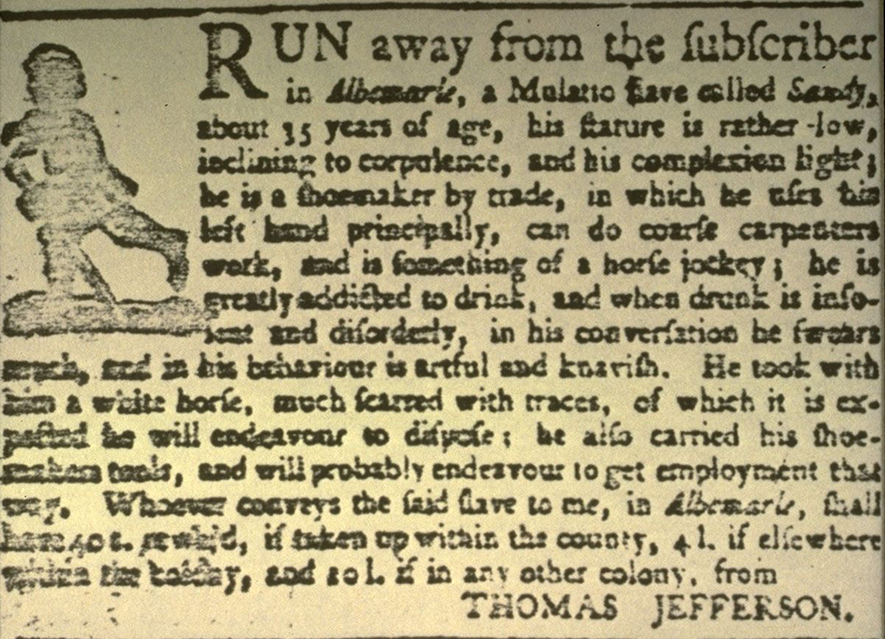
Thomas Jefferson and slavery: "Run away from the subscriber..." (Virginia Gazette, 1769)

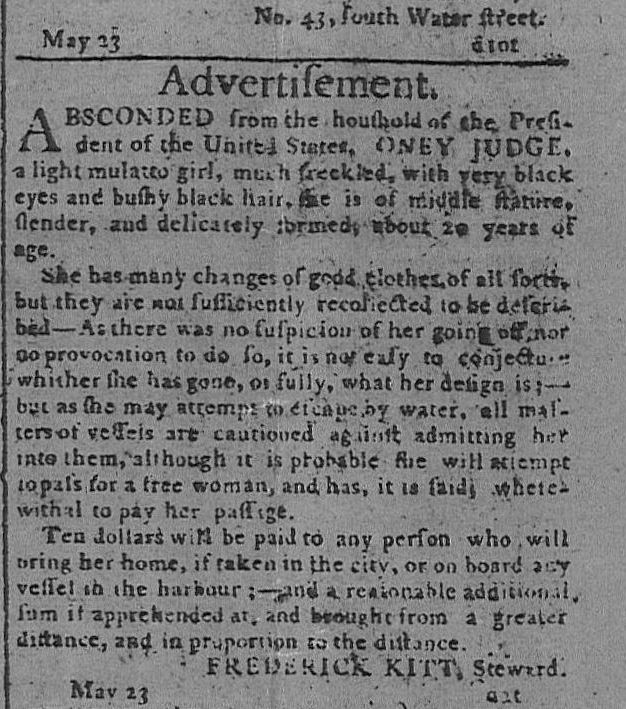
George Washington and slavery: Oney Judge "absconded from the household of the President of the United States..." (Pennsylvania Gazette, May 24, 1796)

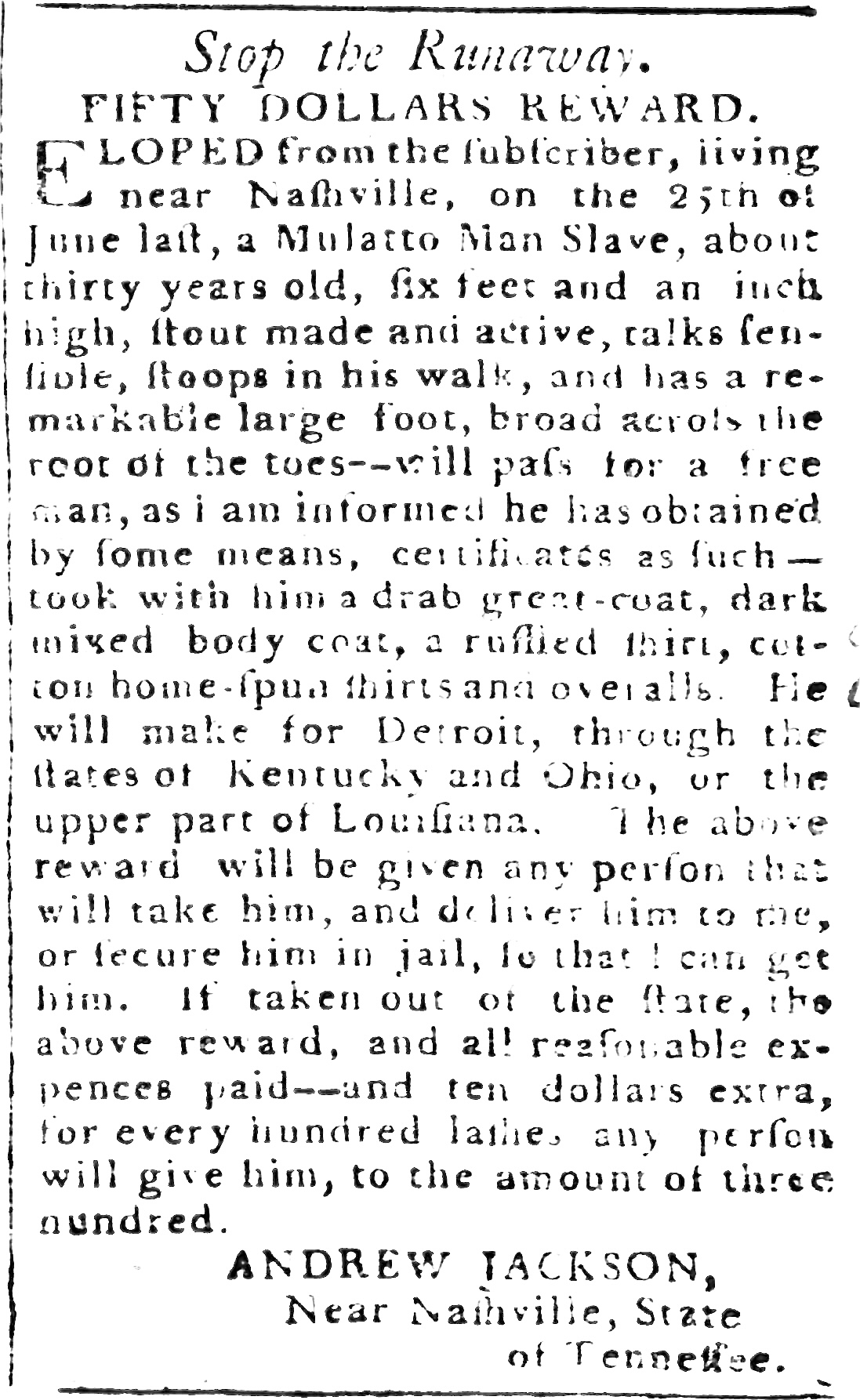
"Stop the Runaway. Fifty Dollars Reward." Andrew Jackson offered to pay extra for more violence (The Tennessee Gazette, October 3, 1804)

== See also ==
- Fugitive slave laws in the United States
- Kidnapping into slavery in the United States
