= The Hermitage (Nashville, Tennessee) =

Historic house in Tennessee, United States

- U.S. National Register of Historic Places
- U.S. National Historic Landmark
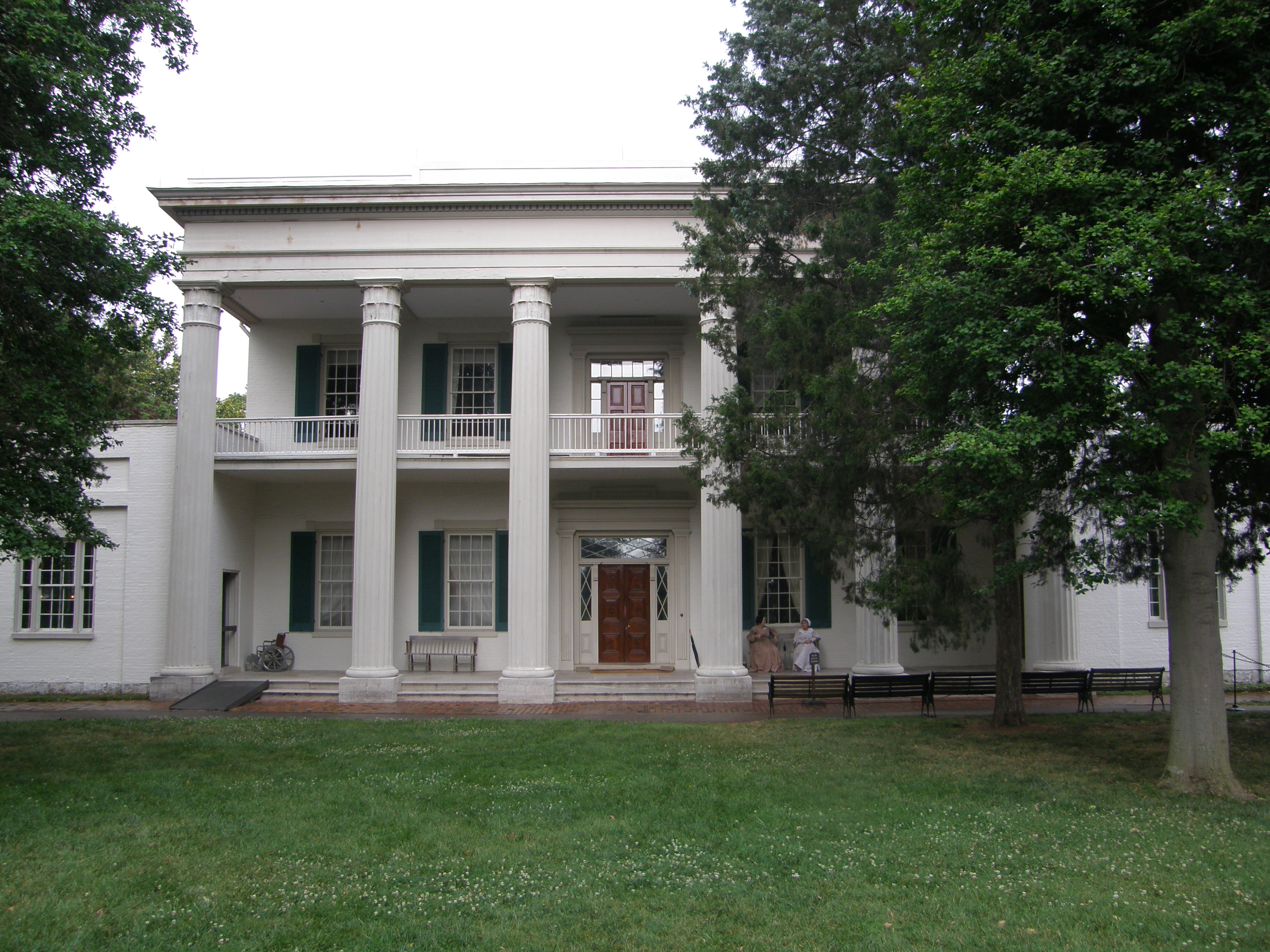
- Front of the mansion in 2007
- Interactive map showing Hermitage's location
- Location: 4580 Rachel's Ln; Hermitage, TN 37076
- Coordinates: 36°12′53.9″N 86°36′46.7″W
- Area: 1,120 acres (450 ha)
- Built: 1837 (current form)
- Architects: Joseph Reiff and William C. Hume
- Architectural style: Greek Revival
- Restored by: Andrew Jackson Foundation
- Website: www.thehermitage.com
- NRHP reference No.: 66000722

Significant dates
- Added to NRHP: October 15, 1966
- Designated NHL: December 19, 1960

The Hermitage is a National Historic Landmark and museum located in Davidson County, Tennessee, United States, 10 miles (16 km) east of downtown Nashville in the neighborhood of Hermitage. The 1,120-acre (450 ha)+ site was owned by President Andrew Jackson, the seventh president of the United States, from 1804 until his death there in 1845. It also serves as his final resting place. Jackson lived at the property intermittently until he retired from public life in 1837.

Andrew Jackson enslaved men, women, and children at the Hermitage, numbering nine at the plantation's purchase in 1804 and 110 at Jackson's death. They were principally involved in growing cotton, the plantation's major cash crop.

== Mansion and grounds ==
=== Architecture ===
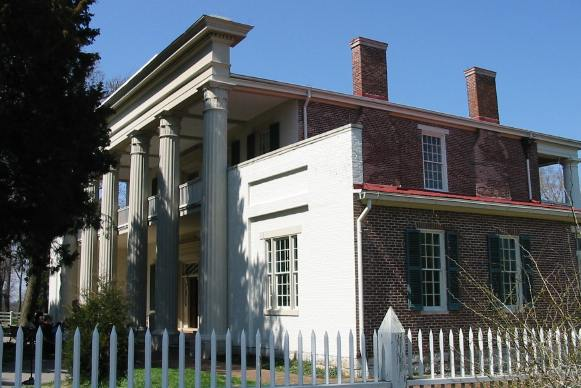
Side view of the house

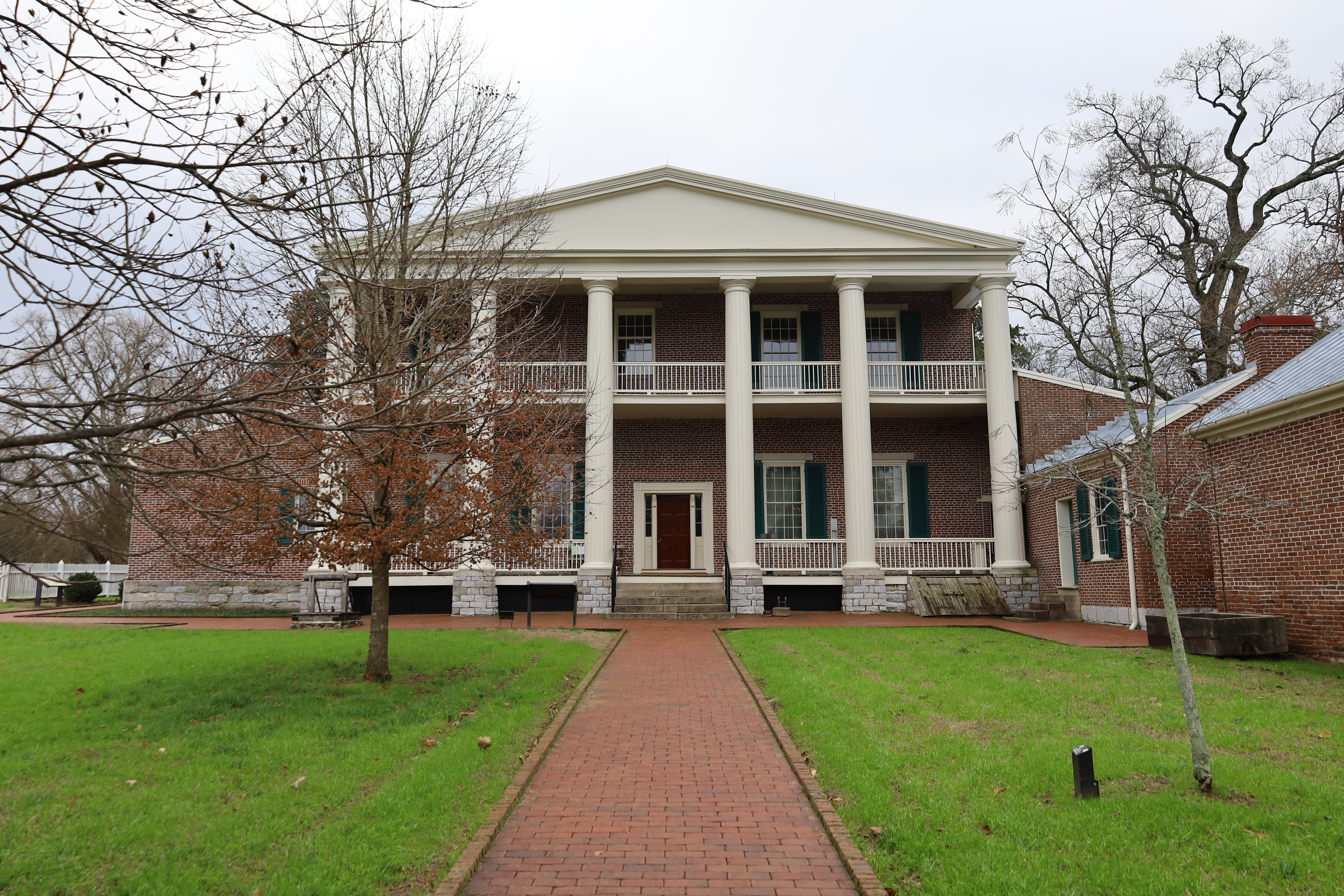
Rear of the mansion in 2022

The Hermitage is built in a secluded meadow that was chosen as a house site by Jackson's wife, Rachel. From 1804 to 1821 the couple lived there in a log cabin. Together the home and the West, East, and Southeast cabins formed the First Hermitage.

Jackson commissioned construction of a more refined home, and the original plantation house was a two-story, Federal-style mansion built with bricks manufactured onsite. Built between 1819 and 1821, the house had four rooms on both floors, each with a fireplace and chimney. The large central hallways opened in warm weather from front to back to form a breezeway. A simple portico was added later. In 1831, while Jackson was residing in the White House, he had the building remodeled in Classical style under the direction of architect David Morrison. The result included flanking one-story wings, a one-story entrance portico with 10 columns, and a small rear portico.

In 1834, a chimney fire seriously damaged the house, with the exception of the dining room wing. This led to Jackson having a architects Joseph Reiff and William C. Hume design a 13-room, Greek Revival structure, which was built upon the foundation of the former home. It was completed three years later. Reiff and Hume also built Tulip Grove across the road.

The mansion has a rectangular layout, about 104 feet (32 m) from east to west and 54 feet (16 m) from north to south. The south front is the location of the main entrance and includes a central block with a five-bay, two-story structure with a portico supported by six modified Corinthian style, wooden columns with a simple entablature resting on the capitals. Within the portico is a second-story balcony with simple square balusters. One-story wings with single windows flank the mansion and extend beyond it to the front of the portico, enclosing it on three sides. While the southern façade gives the appearance of a flat roof, the three other elevations show that the tin-covered roof is pitched. The front façade was painted a light tan, and a sand coating was added to the columns and trim to simulate the appearance of stone. A near replica of the front portico is found on the north end of the house, although it features Doric-style columns and is capped with a pediment.

=== Interior ===
The layout of the main block of the house consists of four large rooms separated by a center hall. The entry hall with plank flooring painted dark is decorated with block-printed wallpaper by Joseph Dufour et Cie of Paris, depicting scenes from Telemachus' visit to the island of Calypso. (Note: Examples of this wallpaper are more often found in New England; the Hermitage paper must have been imported through New Orleans and shipped up the Mississippi River.) At the far end of the hall is the elliptical cantilevered staircase with mahogany handrail that leads to the second level. To the left of the hall are the front and back parlors, featuring crystal chandeliers and Italian marble mantels. Leading from the front parlor is the dining room in the east wing.

Decorated with a high-gloss paint to reflect as much light as possible, the dining room fireplace features a rustic mantelpiece called the "Eighth of January". It was said to have been carved by a veteran of the Battle of New Orleans, who worked on the mantelpiece on each anniversary of the battle until he finished on January 8, 1839. Tradition holds that Jackson installed the piece on the next anniversary, however, this story is likely apocryphal. Adjacent to the dining room is a pantry and storage room that leads to an open passageway to the kitchen. This was built separate from the house to reduce the risk of fire to the main house as well as eliminate the noise, heat, and odors of cooking. To the right of the entrance hall, accessible via a side hall, are two bedrooms that were occupied by President Jackson and his son, Andrew Jackson Jr. A spacious library and office used by Jackson and others to manage the site are located in the west wing.

On the second level are four bedrooms used by family members and guests, including Sam Houston, and Presidents James K. Polk and Martin Van Buren.

=== Grounds ===
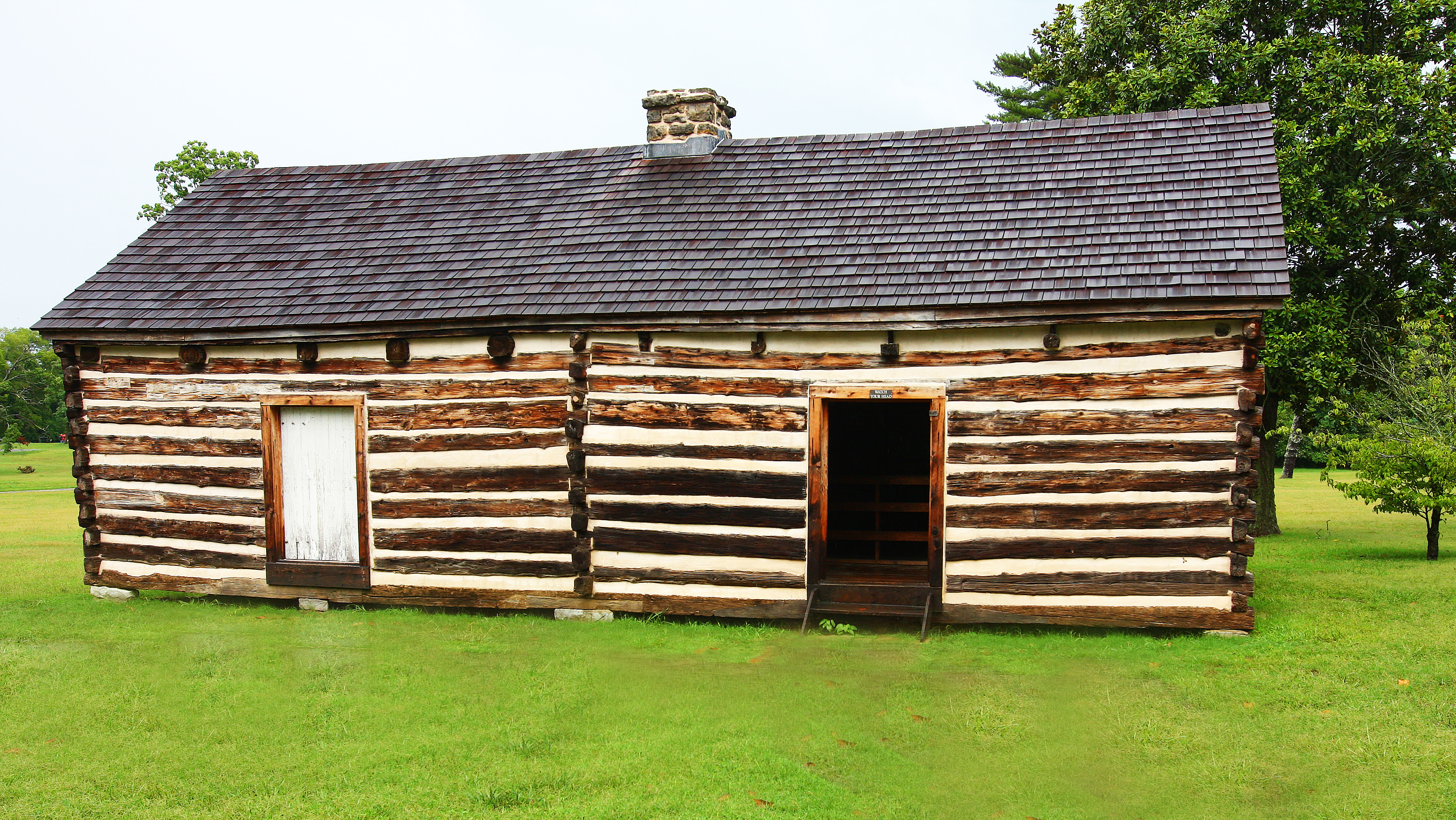
Alfred's Cabin

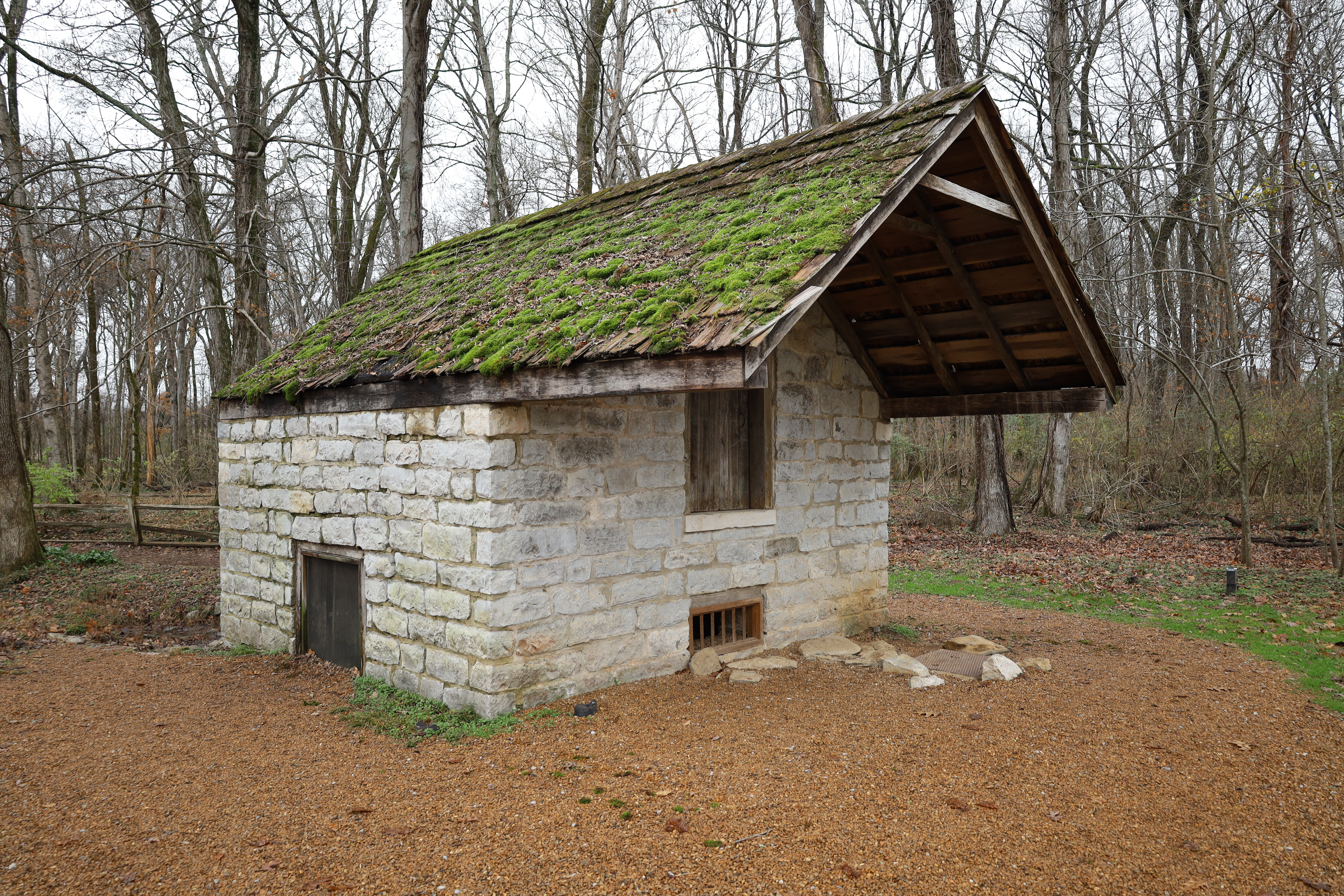
Spring House

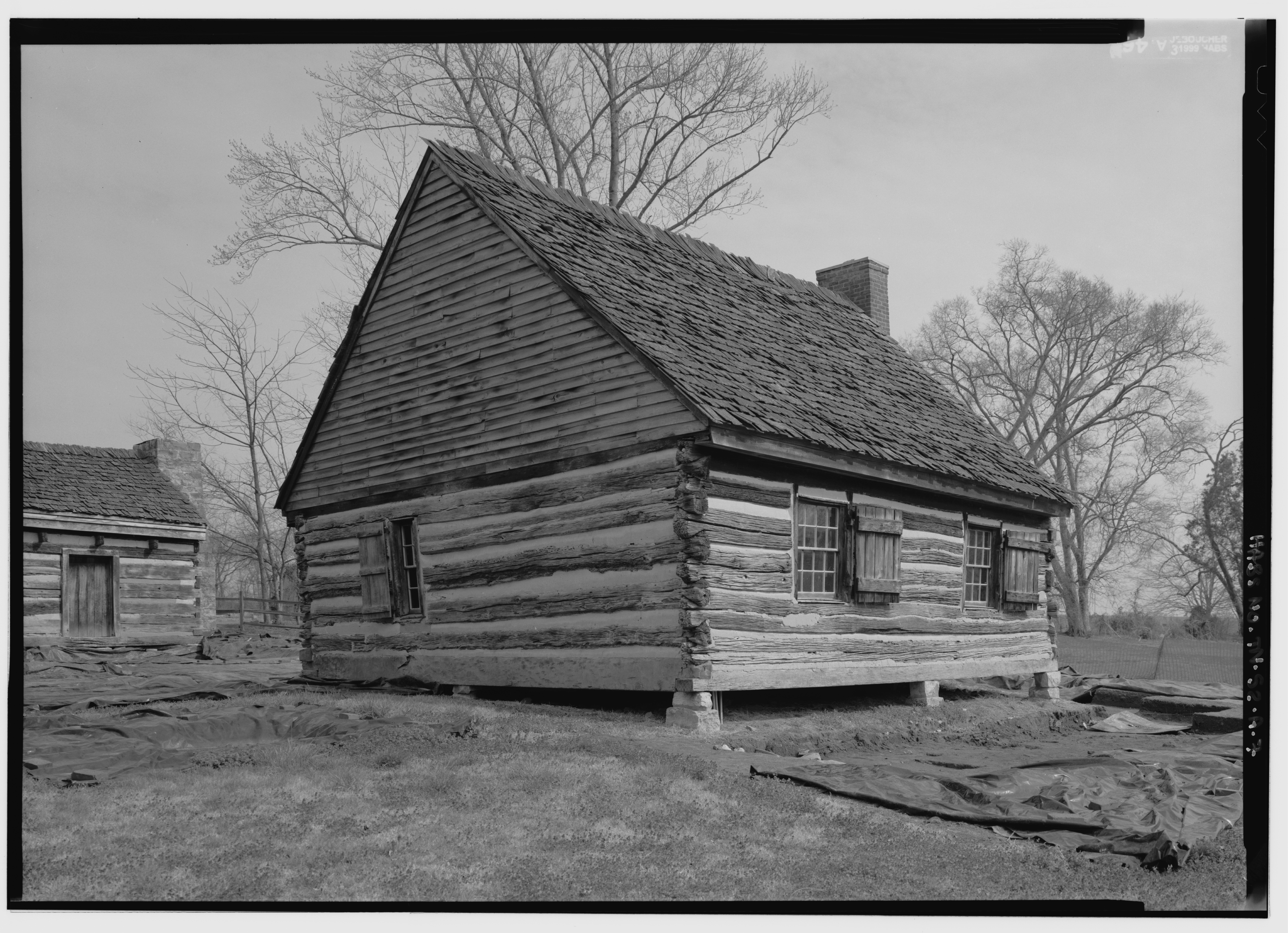
The West Cabin

The site today covers 1,120 acres (450 ha), which includes the original 1,050-acre (420 ha) tract of Jackson's land. It is overseen and managed by The Andrew Jackson Foundation, formerly called the Ladies' Hermitage Association. The mansion is approached by a cedar-lined, 10-foot (3.0 m) wide, guitar-shaped carriage drive designed by Ralph E. W. Earl. The design made it easier to maneuver carriages in the narrow space. To the east of the house was a 1-acre (0.40 ha) formal garden designed by Philadelphia-based gardener William Frost in 1819. Laid out in the English four-square kitchen garden style, it consists of four quadrants and a circular center bedroom contained by unusually long, beveled bricks and pebbled pathways. Originally, the garden was primarily used to produce food for the mansion and, secondarily, as an ornamental pleasure garden. It is surrounded by a white picket fence. On the north perimeter stands a brick privy that served as a status symbol as well as a garden feature.

After Rachel Jackson died in 1828, Jackson had her buried in the garden she loved. When he had the house remodeled in 1831, Jackson also had a Classicizing "temple & monument" constructed for Rachel's grave. Craftsmen completed the domed limestone tomb with a copper roof in 1832.

Behind the mansion, the property includes a smokehouse that dates to the early 19th century. The large brick smokehouse at the rear of the kitchen was built in 1831 and cured 20,000 pounds (9,100 kg) of pork per year. Nearby is a log cabin known as Alfred's Cabin. Alfred Jackson was born enslaved to Andrew Jackson at the Hermitage around 1812 and worked there in various positions. After the Civil War, he stayed as a tenant farmer and later worked as caretaker and guide following the purchase of the estate in 1889 by the Ladies' Hermitage Association. Jackson died in 1901 and was buried near the tomb of the President and Mrs. Jackson.

Two other cabins were built from materials of the First Hermitage. After Jackson built the main house, the two-story log structure he had lived in for 15 years was disassembled, and the materials were used to build two one-story buildings used as workers' quarters.

From 1988 to 2005, teams conducted extensive archaeological investigations at the site. Their work revealed the location of an ice house behind the smokehouse and hundreds of thousands of artifacts. A brick triplex of cabins that was likely used by workers and artisans was discovered near the mansion yard. Archaeologists have identified 13 dwellings used by workers. Remains of three foundation pits suggest there were at least two log houses and four brick duplexes. The cotton gin and cotton press (used for baling) were located in one of the cotton fields just beyond the First Hermitage.

== History ==
The site that Jackson named Hermitage was located 2 miles (3.2 km) from the Cumberland and Stones Rivers after settlers of European descent ethnically cleansed the region of Native Americans. The land was originally settled in 1780 by Robert Hays, who was the grand uncle of Texas Ranger John Coffee Hays and Confederate General Harry Thompson Hays. Hays sold the 420-acre (170 ha) farm to Jackson in 1804. (Note: Additional purchases of adjoining tracts increased the plantation to 640 acres (260 ha).)

=== Cotton plantation ===
Enslaved population of The Hermitage plantation
Year	Enslaved population	Characteristics	Data recorded in
1804	9		(Time of purchase of the land)
1820	44		1820 U.S. Census
1825	80		Davidson County tax list
1829	95	17 women, 19 men, 59 children (age 19 and under)	Hermitage Farm Journal; The Papers of Andrew Jackson: 1829
1830	94		1830 U.S. Census
1840	105		1840 U.S. Census
1845	110		Andrew Jackson probate inventory
1850	137	29 women, 19 men, 51 children (age 19 and under)	1850 U.S. Census
Sources: 1804. 1829. 1820, 1825, 1829, 1830, 1840, 1845, 1850.

Jackson and his wife moved into the existing two-story log blockhouse, built to resist Indian attacks. A lean-to was added on the back of the cabin and to the rear, a group of log outbuildings were erected, including slave cabins, store rooms, and a smokehouse. This complex is known historically as the First Hermitage. Jackson started operations on his cotton farm with nine African slaves, but he continued to buy more laborers and owned 44 slaves by 1820. This scale of operation ranked him as a major planter and slaveholder in middle Tennessee, where most farmers owned zero or fewer than 10 slaves and 20 slaves marked a major planter. Some slave cabins for domestic servants and artisans were located near the main house. The majority, occupied by laborers, were located closer to the fields in an area known as the Field Quarter.

In 1818–1819, prior to his appointment as provisional Governor of the Florida Territory, Jackson built a brick house to replace the log structure he had lived in after purchasing the land. He also added six brick structures, containing a total of 13 20-by-20-foot (6 by 6 m) dwelling units for enslaved workers. These included a three-unit building known as the Triplex, built behind the mansion. A two-unit duplex known as the South Cabin was built at the First Hermitage. Four brick duplexes were built at the Field Quarter and were known as Cabins 1, 2, 3, and 4. At least one Field Cabin was still standing as late as the 1920s.

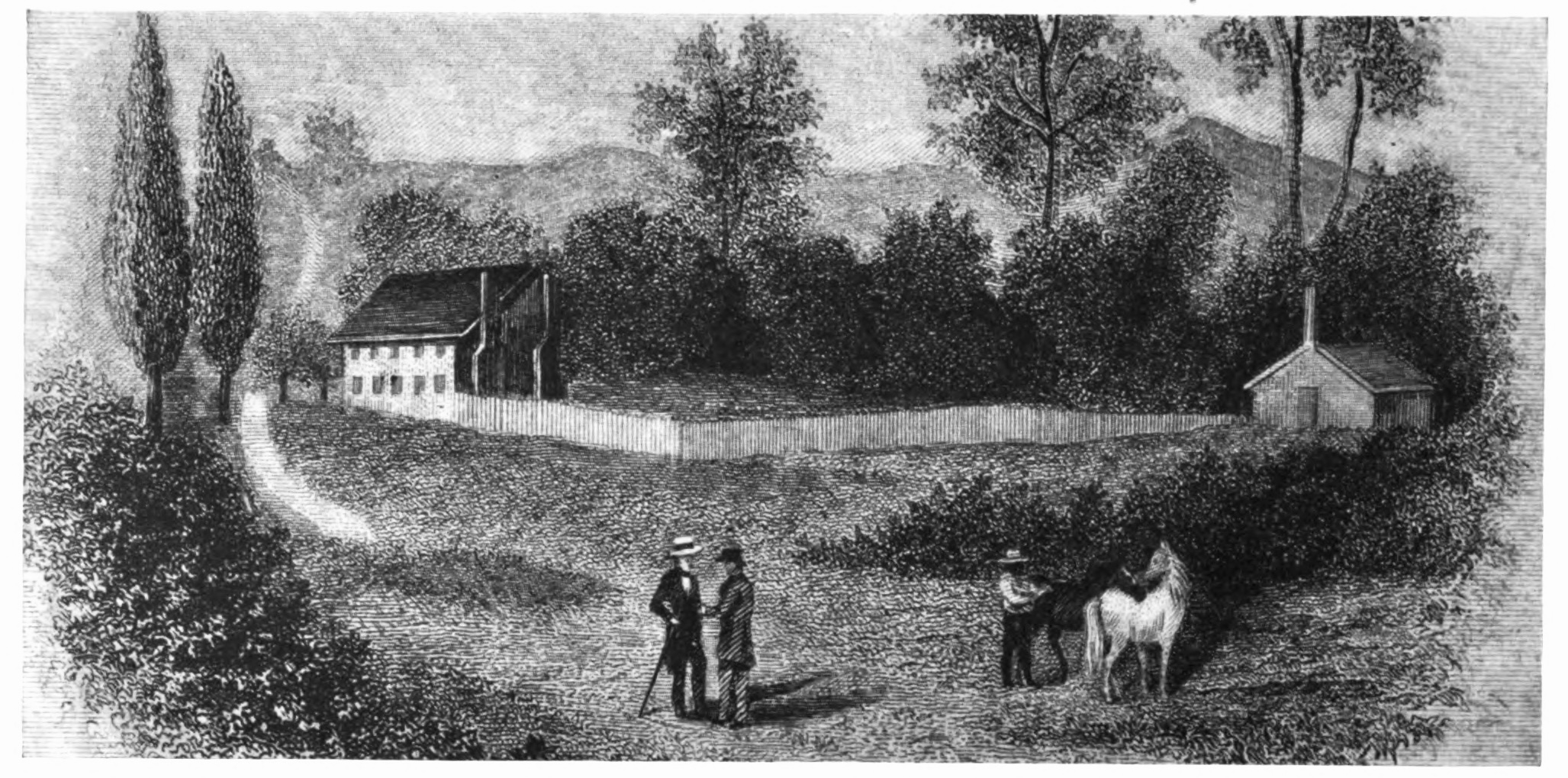
The Hermitage "as it appeared from the time it was built in 1819 until the wings were added in 1831," showing an enslaved man working with two of Jackson's horses; Jackson is on the left in the white hat

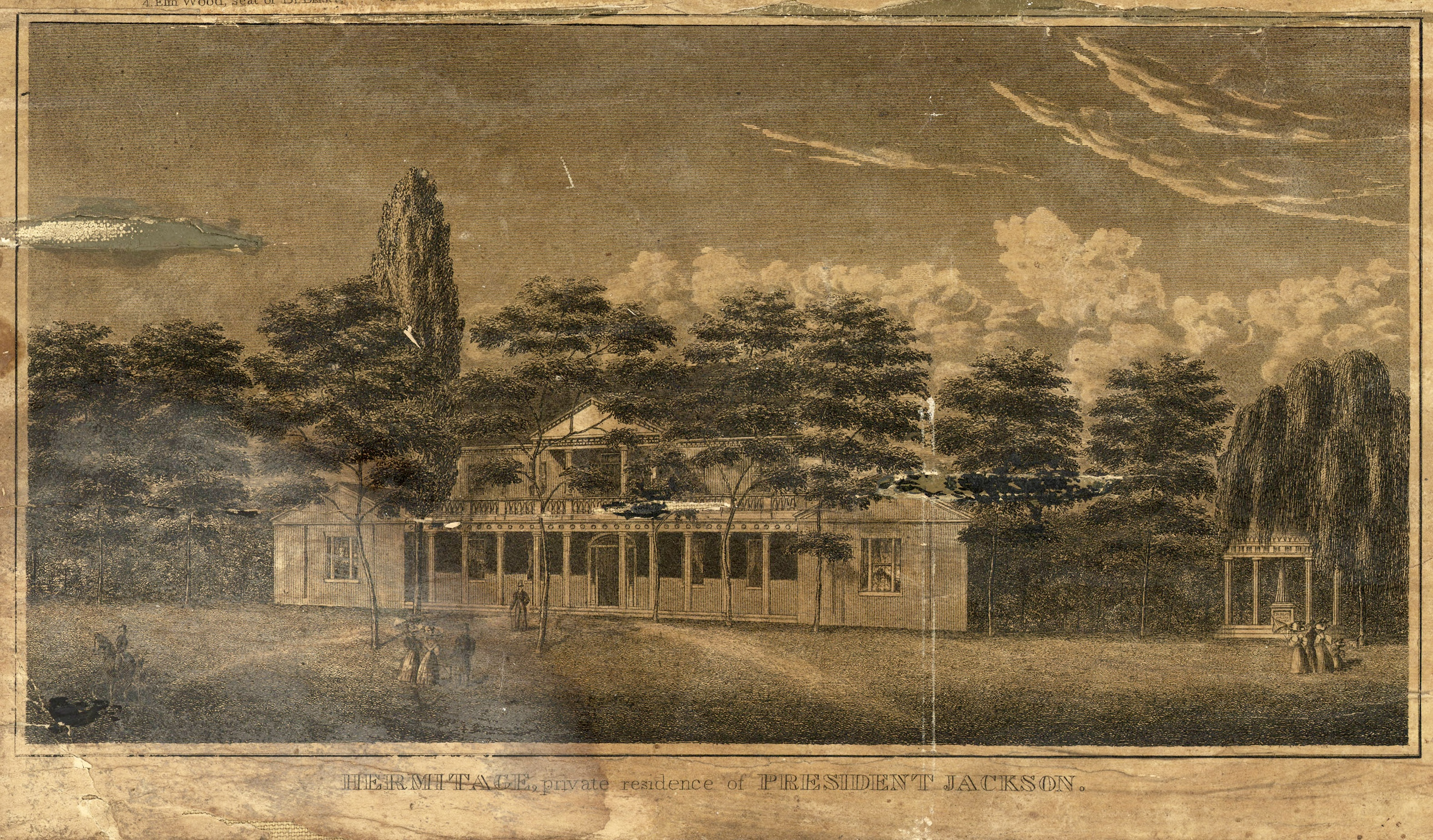
The Hermitage around 1831, as it looked prior to the 1834 fire

Elected President in 1828, Jackson enlarged the Hermitage during his first term. After an 1834 fire destroyed much of the interior of the house, he rebuilt and refurnished it. At the end of his second term in 1837, Jackson retired to the Hermitage, where he died in 1845. Andrew Jackson was buried in the garden next to his wife.

Throughout his life, Jackson expanded the site to an operation of 1,000 acres (400 ha), with 200 acres (81 ha) used for cotton, the commodity crop, and the remainder for food production and breeding and training racehorses. By 1840, more than 100 enslaved men, women, and children lived on the estate. This made the estate among the largest in the region; only 24 Tennessee estates in the 1850 census included more than 100 slaves. At the peak of operations, Jackson held 161 slaves in total: 110 at the Hermitage and 51 at Halcyon plantation in Coahoma County, Mississippi.

Jackson's adopted son, Andrew Jackson Jr., inherited the estate, and Jackson's will also gave his son all slaves, except two boys (given to his grandchildren) and four women (given to Andrew Jr.'s wife, Sarah). Due to debt and bad investments, Jackson Jr. began selling off portions of the estate. In 1856, he sold the remaining 500 acres (200 ha), the mansion, and the outbuildings to the State of Tennessee, with a provision that the Jackson family could remain in residence as caretakers of the estate. The state intended to turn over the property to the federal government for use as a southern branch of the United States Military Academy, but the outbreak of the American Civil War in 1861 disrupted this plan.

=== Civil War and afterwards ===
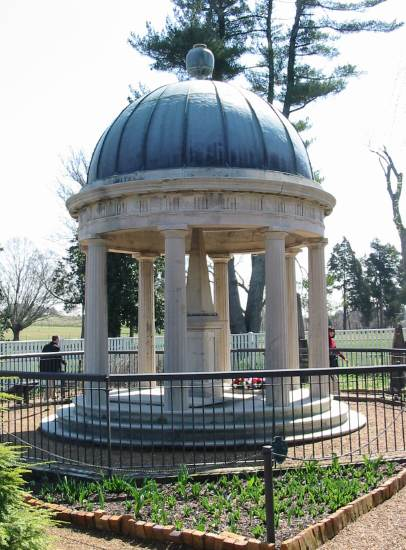
The tomb of Andrew and Rachel Jackson is located in the Hermitage garden.

On May 5, 1863, units of the Union Army from Indiana approached the Hermitage. Pvt. Joseph C. Taylor wrote an account in his diary:

At 2 this morning Co.'s according to previous agreement, saddled up and started for a big scout. About daylight we arrived at Stone River. Colonel McCook was with us. We used great caution while crossing the river. We formed a line of battle and crossed a Company at a time, forming a line on the opposite side. We all crossed in safety, and proceeded to the Hermitage of General A. Jackson, where we halted for a while. Thin by orders of the Colonel went to see the hermitage also the tomb of General A. Jackson. I will describe the place as well as I can. There is a nise gravel road from the Main road to the house. On each side of this mall there is a nise row of large cedar trees, which almost darken the passage as the branches meet overhead. When in 20 steps of the front door, this road forks and directly in front is a space in the shape of a heart. Around this the road runs, which enables the carriage to come up to the door. This heart is enclosed by a similar row of cedars. The inside of this heart, and also on each side of the carriage way is thickly set with pines, cedars and other shrubbery of long standing, which almost excludes the sun shining on the ground. There is nise gravel walks leading to every place that a person want to go. From appearances those walks are but little used, as the grass is growing in the walks to some extent. We then went in the garden which is situated on the East of the house. Which is between the house and the Lebanon Pike, and is full of shrubbery and flowers of all kinds. Also walks running in all directions which beautifies the place and also give it a cold look to me, as I never saw a garden arrainged in this fashion. In the South East corner of this garden stands the monument of General Andrew Jackson. General Jackson lies on the South side of the tomb. His head in the direction of West, his feet to the East. His wife lies on the North and 2 infant children lie on the South of the tomb. It is all together a dark and secluded spot and looks to me as though it was very old fassion.

— Pvt. Joseph C. Taylor, Co. I, 2nd Indiana Cavalry

=== Museum ===
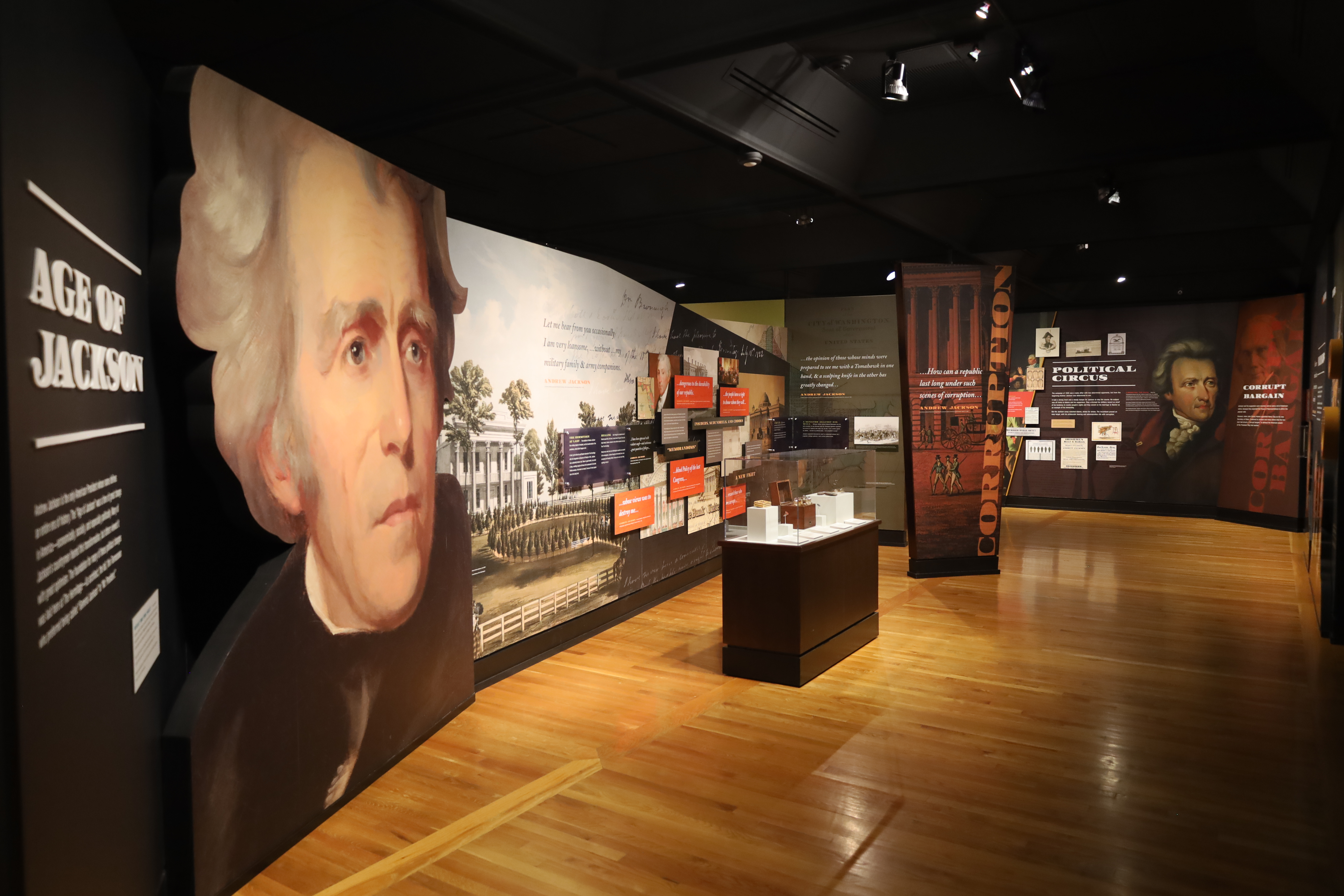
Museum displays in 2022

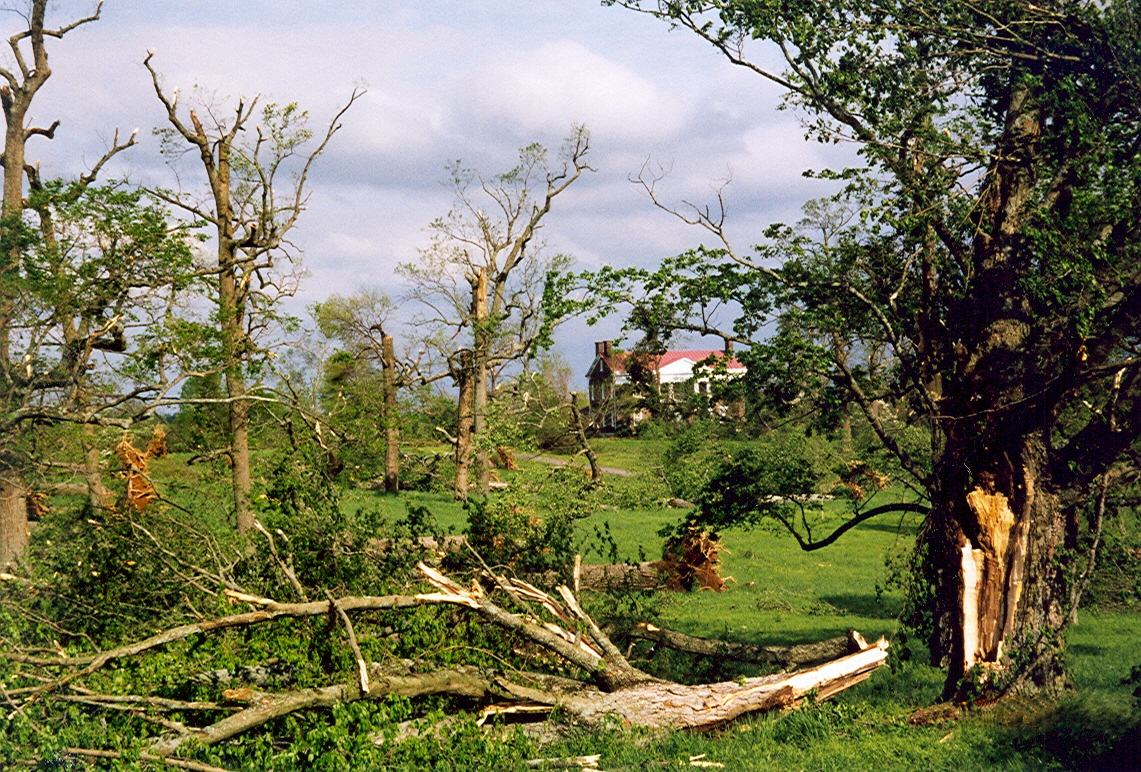
The Hermitage, 1998 tornado damage

Andrew Jackson's grandson, Andrew Jackson III, and his family were the last to occupy the Hermitage. The family moved out in 1893, and it ceased being a family residence. The Hermitage was opened to the public by the Ladies' Hermitage Association, who had been deeded the property by the state of Tennessee for use as a museum of both Jackson's life and the antebellum South in general. The Association restored the mansion to its 1837 appearance. Over time, the organization bought back all the land that had been sold, taking ownership of the last parcel that restored the site boundaries in 2003.

The Hermitage escaped disaster during the 1998 Nashville tornado outbreak. An F-3 tornado crossed the property at about 4 p.m. on April 16, 1998, missing the house and grave site but toppling 1,000 trees on the estate, many that were reportedly planted by Jackson himself nearly 200 years earlier. The trees once hid the house from passers-by on U.S. Route 70, but their loss left the mansion in plain sight.

Using wood from the fallen trees, Gibson Guitar Corporation produced 200 limited-edition "Old Hickory" guitars. The first guitar produced was presented to the Smithsonian, although as of 2018, it was not on display.

The mansion is the most accurately preserved early presidential home in the country. Each year, the home receives more than a quarter million visitors, making it the fourth-most-visited presidential residence in the country (after the White House, Mount Vernon, and Monticello). The property was declared a National Historic Landmark in 1960.

Based on archaeological excavations and other research, the Hermitage mounted an exhibition on slave life at the plantation in 2005. It is installed in the Visitor Center and provides much more focus on the lives of enslaved African American families at the plantation, ranging from the domestic staff to field laborers.

=== Enslaved Memorial ===
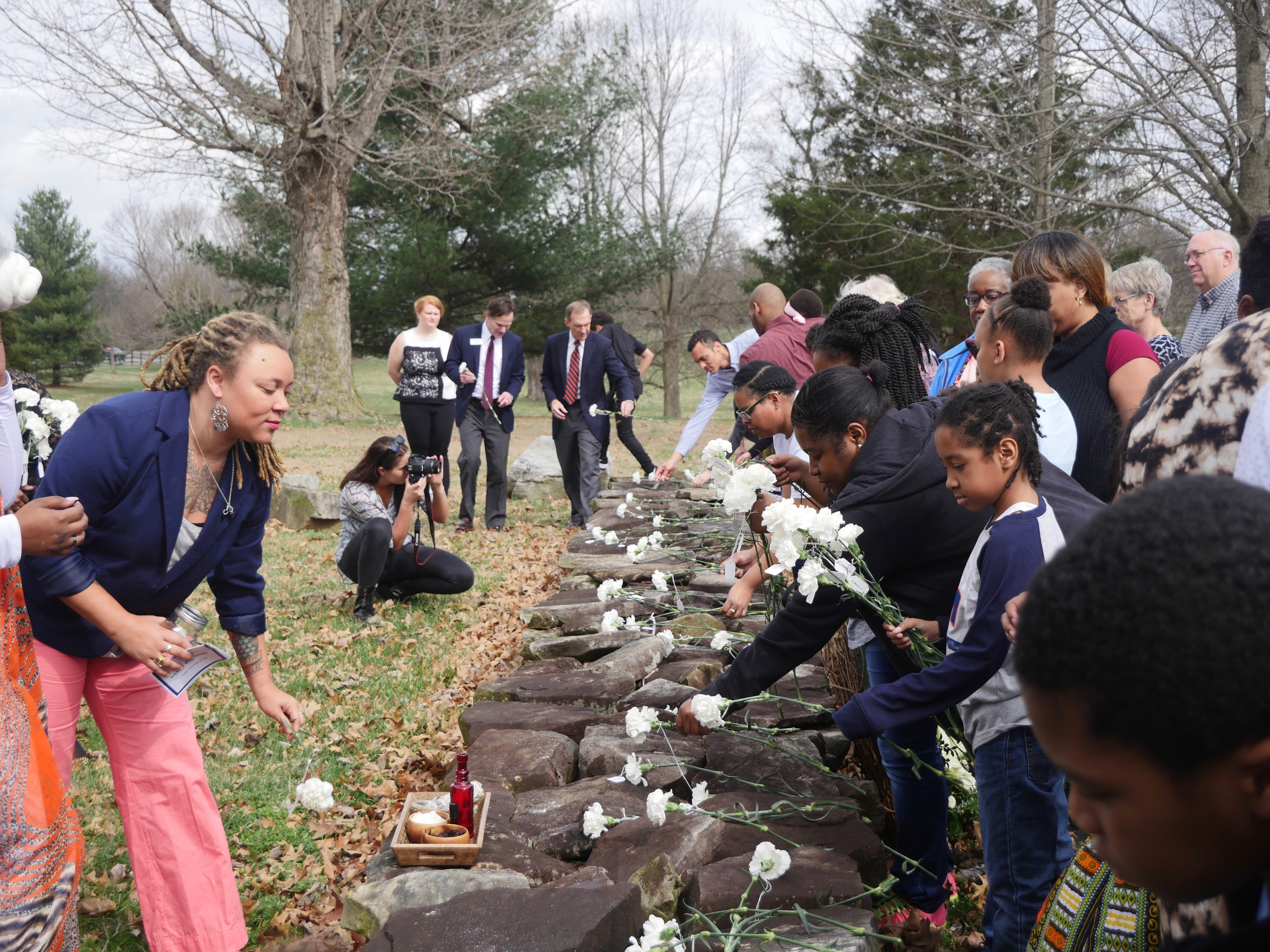
Participants in a memorial ceremony to the people enslaved at the Hermitage lay flowers in remembrance of each upon the stones of the Monument to the Enslaved

In 2006, the remains of 61 enslaved people who had been the legal property of Rachel Jackson's nephews were discovered near the Hermitage. Their burials were unmarked, but they were arranged in family groups and were estimated to range in age from 1 to 45. The Ladies Hermitage Association took charge of their burials in a new common grave on the Hermitage site. Atop their reburial, a memorial was built in 2009 in remembrance of the enslaved people of the area. The site design, "Our Peace: Follow the Drinking Gourd—A Monument to the Enslaved," proposed by Aaron Lee Benson, includes an unmarked stone wall over the burial site and seven trees arranged in the shape of the Little Dipper. Both the constellation and "follow the drinking gourd" refer to the practice of navigating by the North Star to escape from slavery.

=== Hermitage slave cemetery ===
In 2024, researchers found a burial ground believed to hold the graves of 28 enslaved people. Researchers had been looking for the slave burial ground for well over 20 years. Some historians have speculated that Lyncoya Jackson may have been buried in the slave cemetery.

=== Confederate Soldiers Home Cemetery ===
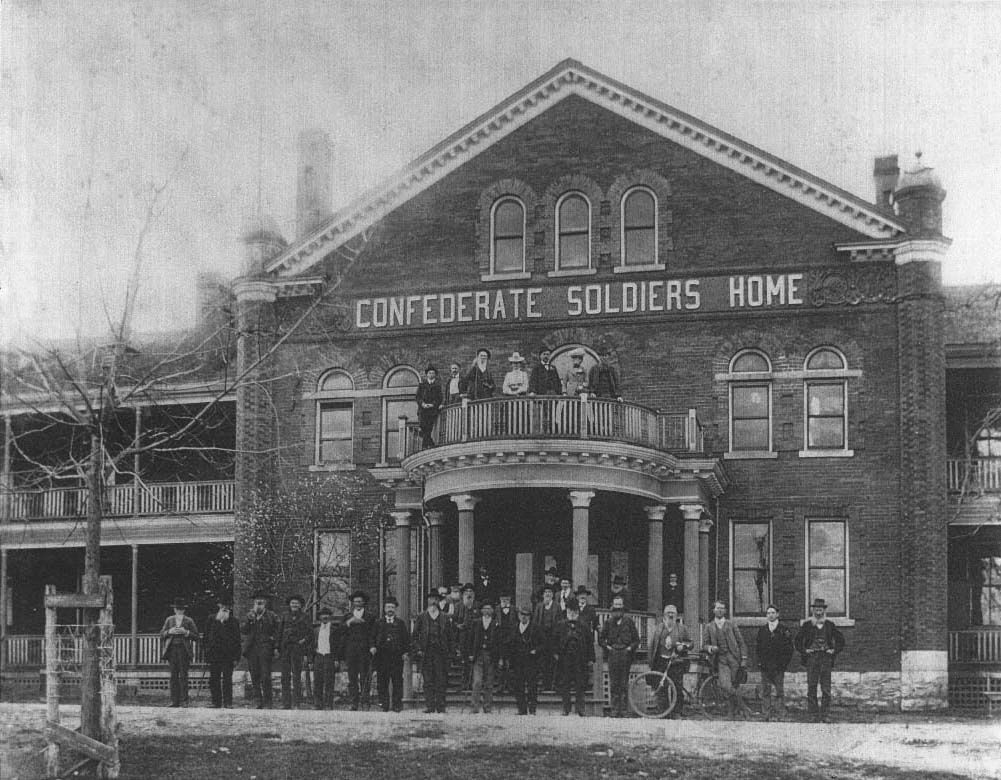
Veterans at the Confederate Soldiers Home, circa 1908

Part of the Hermitage estate that passed in to public hands became the site of the state-funded Confederate Soldiers Home, a residential facility that housed poor and disabled Confederate veterans beginning in 1892. More than 480 veterans who died there were buried in an onsite cemetery, each marked with a white, military-style gravestone and arrayed in circles around a monumental stone.

== Legacy ==
The city in Davidson County where the Hermitage is located is known as Hermitage, Tennessee. A hotel named the Hermitage Hotel, located in downtown Nashville, opened in 1910 and is still operating. Many celebrities and U.S. presidents have spent time there.

== In popular culture ==
- The Hermitage is prominently featured in one of the opening scenes of F. Scott Fitzgerald's unfinished novel The Last Tycoon (1941), when the narrator, Celia, visits it with two other characters.
- The Hermitage was one of the filming locations and settings for the 1955 Disney film Davy Crockett, King of the Wild Frontier.
- Dolly Parton filmed performances for songs like "The Battle of New Orleans," "Dixie," and "Battle Hymn of the Republic" at the Hermitage for her variety show, Dolly, in 1976.
U.S. Postage stamps depicting the Hermitage

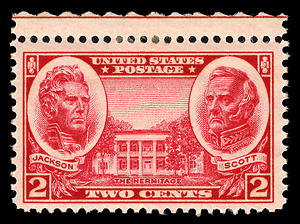
2-cent, 1937 issue

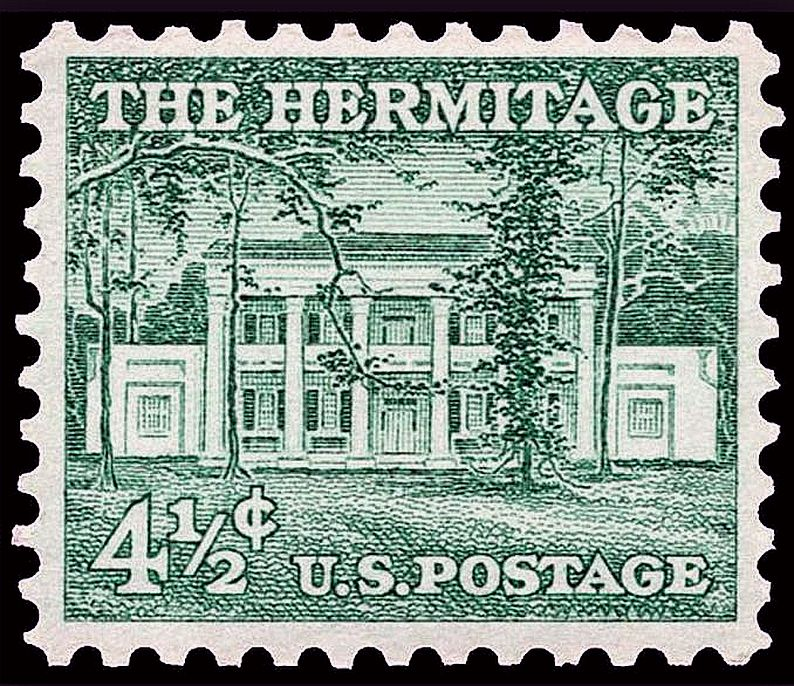
4 1/2-cent, 1959 issue

== See also ==
- List of residences of presidents of the United States
- List of burial places of presidents and vice presidents of the United States
- National Register of Historic Places listings in Davidson County, Tennessee
- List of National Historic Landmarks in Tennessee
- Presidential memorials in the United States
- Plantations of Andrew Jackson
- Andrew Jackson's plantations in northern Alabama
