= Alfred Jackson (Tennessee) =

Formerly enslaved man and tour guide at the Hermitage (1812–1901)

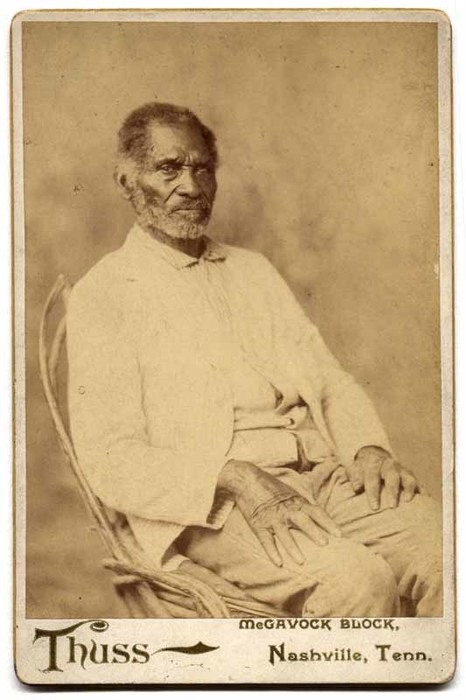
Alfred Jackson photographed late 19th century

Alfred Jackson (c. 1812 – September 4, 1901) was an African American man enslaved by Andrew Jackson who worked as his wagoner, carriage driver, and stableman. After emancipation, he became a tenant farmer, building caretaker, and tour guide at the Hermitage, Andrew Jackson's plantation in Tennessee, United States. Alfred was born into enslavement on the Hermitage around 1812. He lived at the Hermitage longer than any other person, and was a valued living history resource in later life, especially after the Ladies' Hermitage Association took over the property in 1889. He is buried next to Andrew Jackson in the Hermitage cemetery.

== See also ==
- Hannah Jackson
- List of presidents of the United States who owned slaves
