= Halcyon plantation =

Andrew Jackson investment in Mississippi

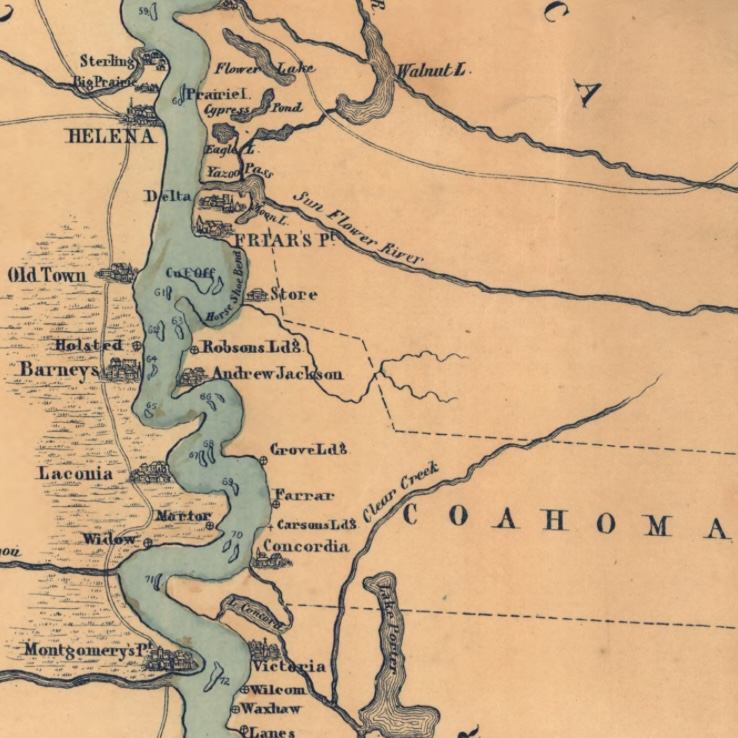
Landmark called "Andrew Jackson" along the Mississippi River in Coahoma County, Mississippi in 1863 was the location of Halcyon plantation

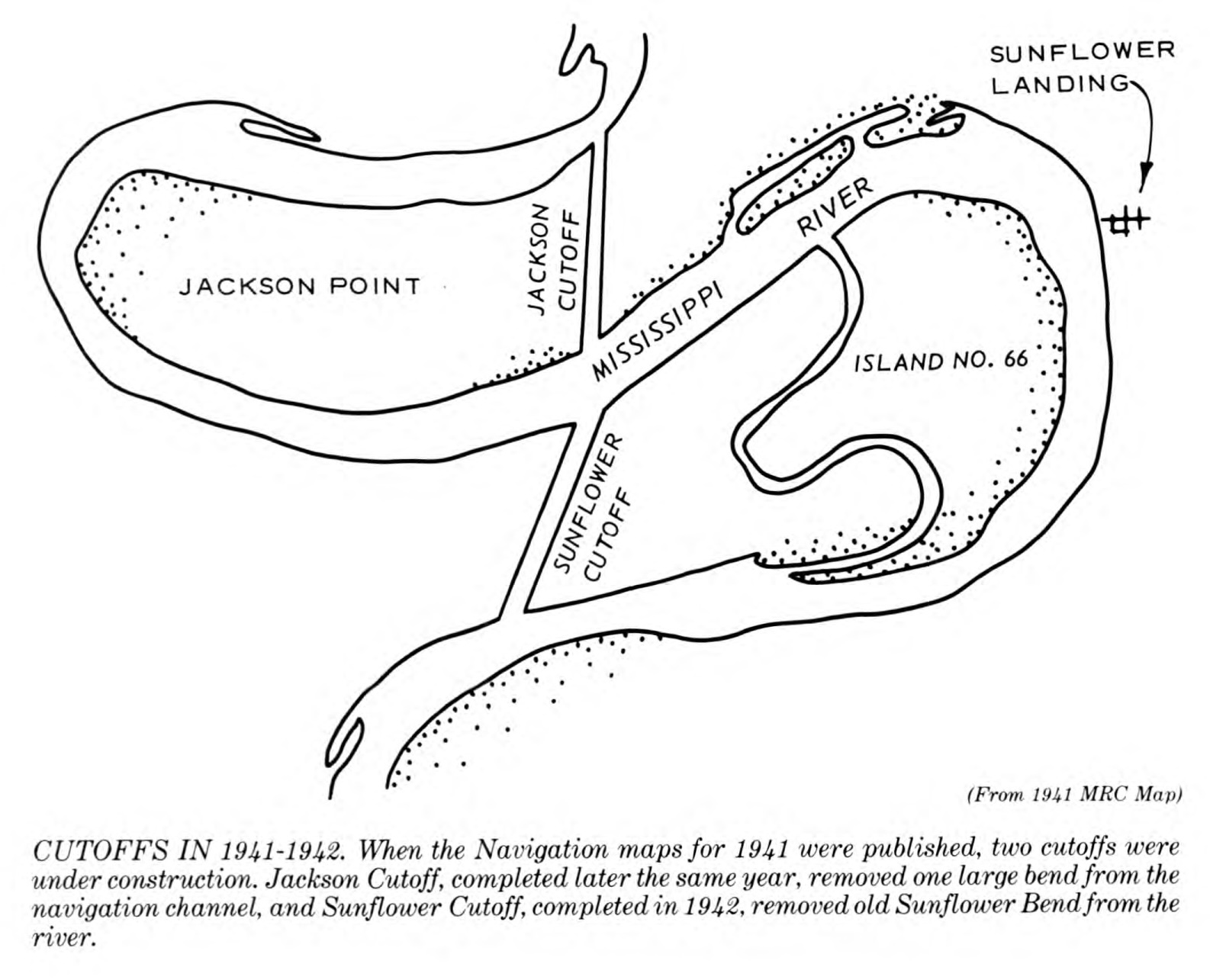
Jackson Point and the old Sunflower Landing mapped 1977

Halcyon plantation was a property in Coahoma County, Mississippi, United States that was purchased in 1838 by former U.S. President Andrew Jackson as an investment property for his son Andrew Jackson Jr. The property was nominally Junior's but Jackson "was the real purchaser and owner".

The 1,100-acre (450 ha) property was acquired for US$23,700 (equivalent to $716,555 in 2025), to be paid in four equal installments, the first due in 1839. Halycon was plagued by an array of problems including inadequate management, neglect of the enslaved workforce, and a series of natural disasters including an 1843 Mississippi River flood that destroyed 60,000 lb (27,000 kg) of cotton. Jackson Jr. bought another 480 acres in Coahoma for $4,000 in 1844. The same year the property was swamped in up to six feet of flood water; the overseer wrote that "he had been over the entire plantation in a canoe. Fences were all down. He had built a raft for the hogs, but it was loosed from its moorings, so all the hogs were lost. The horses and mules were at the point of death, while the cattle had escaped into the canebrakes where they too were dying."

The former president died in 1845 heavily in debt but his political ally Francis P. Blair and his partner John C. Rives made several payments on the property such that their names appeared on deeds for the property. Jackson Jr. ultimately sold 1,700 acres (690 ha) in Coahoma County for US$25,500 (equivalent to $948,894 in 2025) in 1858. After Junior relinquished the property, it quickly reverted from farmland to woodland.

As a result of the Jackson Cutoff and Sunflower Cutoff in 1941 and 1942, the course of the Mississippi River shifted and the land is now on the west side of the river adjacent to the U.S. state of Arkansas. Circa 1955 the property that had once been Halcyon was owned by Grief Brothers Cooperage Corp., Chicago Mills, the Coahoma County Conservation League and Burke Landing Realty Co. According to the Clarksdale Register, "Chicago Mill and Lumber Co. owned the tract for a time and occasionally harvested timber there, but for the most part it has been a haven for hunters." As of 1991 Jackson Point Hunting Club owned what had once been Halcyon.

== See also ==
- Andrew Jackson and land speculation

== Sources ==
- Walker, Arda (1943). "Andrew Jackson; Planter". The East Tennessee Historical Society's Publications. 15: 19–34. ISSN 0361-6193. LCCN 29013045. OCLC 39989616. FHL 1345525.
