= Portraits of Andrew Jackson =

Notable images of 7th U.S. president

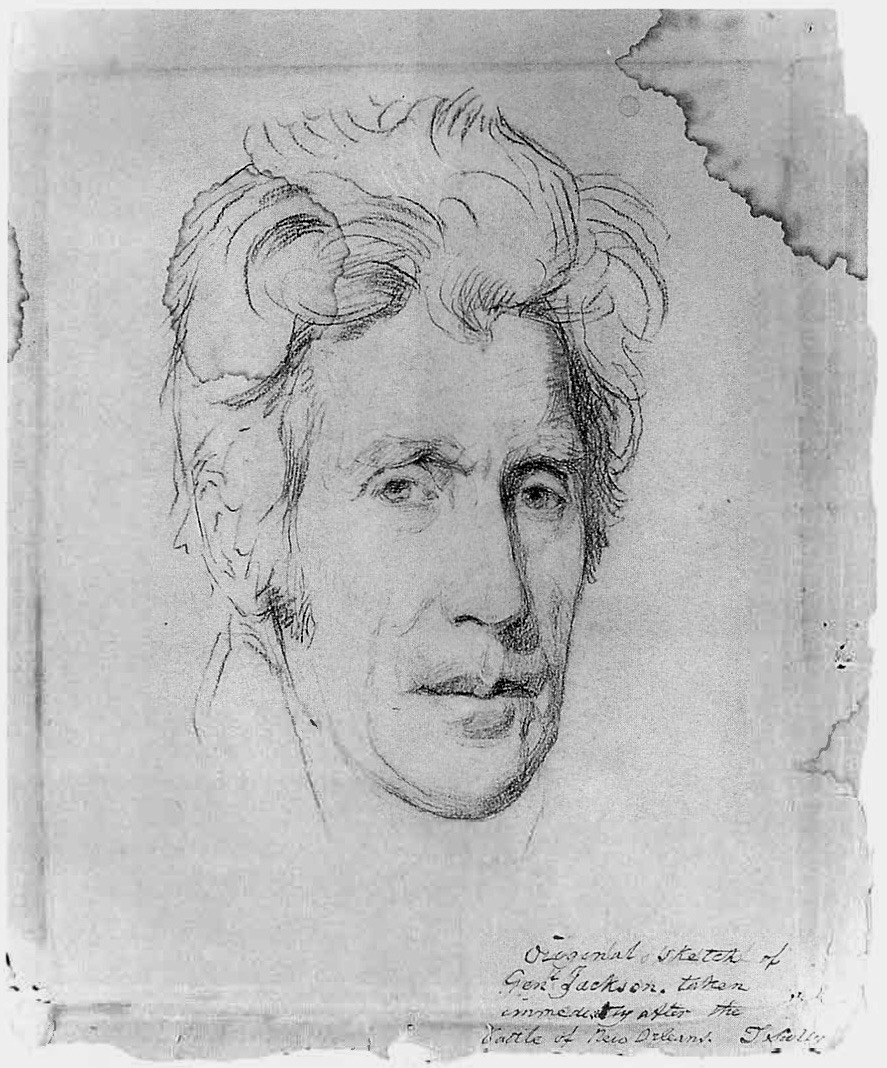
Andrew Jackson, charcoal on paper by Thomas Sully, sketched shortly after the battle of New Orleans (The Detroit Institute of Arts, Gift of Mrs. Walter O. Briggs, Detroit, Michigan)

This is a list of portraits of Andrew Jackson, who served as the seventh president of the United States from 1829 to 1837. Born with hair variously described as reddish or sandy, Jackson was 47 years old, middle-aged and with fully "iron-gray" hair, when he came to national renown. All surviving images of Andrew Jackson were created after the Battle of New Orleans in 1815. Most early portraits have him in military uniform; according to historian Charles G. Sellers, "The full dress uniform that Andrew Jackson took to New Orleans in 1814, a magnificent outfit costing over $500, had been bought for him in Philadelphia by Joel Childress," the father-in-law of future 11th president James K. Polk, who was sometimes called "Young Hickory" to Jackson's "Old Hickory".

Historians believe that Jackson sat for about 35 portraits, and that there are a total of about 200 paintings of Jackson done in oils or watercolor, many created posthumously and/or copied from existing images. His nephew-in-law Ralph Earl was considered the "court painter" of the Andrew Jackson administration, producing "numerous paintings of Jackson, some of distinction, but many repetitious in nature and mediocre in quality, which were political icons rather than art." Earl painted his first Jackson portrait on or around February 22, 1817. John James Audubon, who lived in the lower Mississippi River valley in the early 1820s, saw one Earl portrait of Jackson that had been purchased by the city of New Orleans, about which he wrote in his journal, "Great God forgive Me if my judgment is Erroneous, I Never Saw A Worse painted Sign in the streets of Paris." On the other side of the coin, Jacksonians held "the firm opinion that Earl's canvasses reflect the true likeness and character of the General better than his more celebrated contemporaries. After all, they reason, Earl had the advantage of many years of intimate daily association with his subject."

Jackson also sat for photographers in the 1840s, resulting in four surviving daguerreotypes of him in old age, when he was constantly ill and toothless (physically if not behaviorally). The portrait on the US$20 bill created by the U.S. Treasury department's Bureau of Engraving and Printing in the 1920s is based on Thomas Sully's posthumous paintings of Jackson based on earlier sketches drawn from life, such as the 1845 portrait now housed in the National Gallery of Art. Sully depicted Jackson with somewhat wavy hair, but Jackson's hair was usually described as "stiff and wiry" or "bristling."

Biographer Andrew Burstein divided the portraits of Jackson into three general categories of depiction: gentleman, enigma, and hero, creating a confusion such that "Jackson's elusiveness to the modern mind is well-symbolized" by the variation. Another writer commented: "after viewing this extensive Jacksonian gallery, one is prompted to exclaim: 'Will the real Andrew Jackson please stand up!'"

Color key: Pre- and post-presidential portraits Presidential-era portraits

== Paintings ==
Image	Date	Age	Artist	Institution	Technique	Notes
	1815	48	Nathan Wheeler	?	Oil on canvas	There are no known images of Andrew Jackson before 1815, this was painted from life in 1815 after the battle of New Orleans
	1815	48	Jean François de Vallée	Historic Hudson Valley	Miniature on ivory	
	c. 1817	50	John Wesley Jarvis	White House Collection	Oil on canvas	Improved copy of Jarvis' own original, which he modeled after the 1815 portrait by Nathan Wheeler.
	1817	50	Ralph Eleaser Whiteside Earl	National Portrait Gallery		
	1817	50	Ralph Eleaser Whiteside Earl	The Hermitage, Nashville		
	1817	50	Ralph Eleaser Whiteside Earl	Tennessee State Museum		
	1819	52	Samuel Lovett Waldo	Metropolitan Museum of Art	Oil on canvas	
	1819	52	Samuel Lovett Waldo	Historic New Orleans Collection	Oil on canvas	
	1819	52	Samuel Lovett Waldo	Addison Gallery of American Art, Phillips Andover Academy	Oil on canvas	According to biographer Robert V. Remini, Waldo produced one of the "better likenesses" of Jackson
	1819	52	Charles Willson Peale	The Masonic Library and Museum of Pennsylvania of The Grand Lodge F. & A. M. of Pennsylvania, Philadelphia	Oil on canvas	
	1819	52	Rembrandt Peale	Maryland Center for History and Culture	Oil on canvas	Commissioned by the city of Baltimore. Historian Andrew Burstein notes that father and son Peale painted their portraits of Jackson within a month of each other "yet the two likenesses suggest dramatically different men."
	1819	52	Anna Claypoole Peale	Yale University Art Gallery	Watercolor on ivory	Painted in Washington, D.C. while Jackson was there defending himself in Congress against charges of misconduct in the First Seminole War
	1819	52	John Wesley Jarvis	Metropolitan Museum of Art	Oil on canvas	Commissioned by the city of New York; Remini considered this a "romantic portrait"
	c. 1822	55	Possibly Matthew Harris Jouett	Historic New Orleans Collection	Oil on wood panel	
	1824	57	Thomas Sully			Painted from life, "the original 1824 study was privately owned by Mrs. Breckenridge Long in 1940, but its current location is unknown."
	1824	57	Robert Street	Sedalia Public Library, Sedalia, Missouri		
	1828	57	Asher B. Durand	New York City Hall	Oil	"After John Vanderlyn," collection of New-York Historical Society, New York
	1828	61	James Barton Longacre (attributed)			Original image lost (?)
	1829	62	Thomas Sully		Oil on panel	Sold at auction on May 20, 2010 from the Historical Society of Pennsylvania.
	1830	63	Ralph Eleaser Whiteside Earl	DAR Museum	Oil on canvas	"The Jockey Club Portrait" Jackson is sitting in a chair ordered by James Monroe from Pierre-Antoine Bellange, in the distance is the U.S. Capitol with the "Bullfinch dome," which is distinct from the present dome.
	1830	63	Ralph Eleaser Whiteside Earl	Private collection		"Farmer Jackson" portrait
	1828–1831	61–66	Ralph Eleaser Whiteside Earl	The Hermitage, Nashville		"Tennessee gentleman" portrait
	1832	65	Ralph Eleaser Whiteside Earl	North Carolina Museum of Art		
	1833	66	Ralph Eleaser Whiteside Earl	Brooks Museum of Art, Memphis		
	1833	66	Ralph Eleaser Whiteside Earl	The Hermitage, Nashville		Andrew Jackson Astride Sam Patch
	1832–35	65–68	William James Hubard			
	1835	68	Samuel M. Charles		"Miniature"	Andrew Jackson had lost all of his original teeth by 1828. Per biographer Robert V. Remini, he was "refusing to wear his dentures" when he sat for this portrait.
	1835	68	David Rent Etter	Second Bank of the United States, Independence National Park, Philadelphia		Depicts Jackson, seated at the White House, pointing a copy of the Proclamation to the People of South Carolina
	1835	68	Ralph Eleaser Whiteside Earl	White House Collection	Oil on canvas	
	1835	68	Ralph Eleaser Whiteside Earl	The Hermitage, Nashville		
	1836	69	Ralph Eleaser Whiteside Earl	Columbia Museum of Art, Columbia, South Carolina		
	1836–37	69–70	Ralph Eleaser Whiteside Earl	Smithsonian American Art Museum		"The National Picture," possession transferred to museum from U.S. District Court for the District of Columbia
	1836	69	William Stewart Watson			
	1837	70	Ralph Eleaser Whiteside Earl	The Hermitage, Nashville		
	1840	73	Miner Kilbourne Kellogg	National Portrait Gallery	Oil on canvas	
	January 1840	73	Jacques Amans	Historic New Orleans Collection	Oil on canvas	Jackson is seen on the occasion of his visit to New Orleans on the 25th anniversary of the Battle of New Orleans.
	1840	73	Edward Dalton Marchant	Union League of Philadelphia (?)	Oil on canvas	
	1840	73	James Tooley Jr.			"After Marchant"
	1840	73	Trevor Thomas Fowler	National Portrait Gallery	Oil on canvas	
	1842	75	John Wood Dodge	Tennessee State Museum		Commissioned by Gen. Robert Armstrong
	May 1845	78	George Peter Alexander Healy	The Hermitage, Nashville	Oil on canvas	Painted from life when Jackson was near death, Healy painted a portrait of Sarah Yorke Jackson during the same sittings; three versions exist; "According to Marquis James's biography of Jackson, a dropsical swelling having spread to Jackson's face, only the eyes, the right one blind, the forehead and the hair were painted from life."

== Photographs ==
Image	Date	Age	Photographer	Technique	Notes
	1844				J. E. Moore of New Orleans was "reported in March of 1842 as practicing the daguerrean art at the rooms of Madame Berniaud at the corner of Baronne and Canal streets. Specimens of the daguerreotype on view at his rooms included a likeness of General Andrew Jackson."
	1844–45	77–78	Possibly by Edward Anthony, copy made by Mathew Brady	Half-plate gold-tone daguerreotype	
	1844–45	77–78	Possibly by Edward Anthony, copy made by Mathew Brady	Half-plate gold-tone daguerreotype	
				Copy by Mathew Brady	

== Posthumous ==
Image	Date	Artist	Institution	Technique	Notes	
	1845	Thomas Sully	National Gallery of Art	Oil on canvas	One of the inspirations for Jackson's likeness on the U.S. twenty-dollar bill.	
	1845	Thomas Sully	National Gallery of Art	Oil on canvas		
	1857	Thomas Sully	United States Senate Collection	Oil on canvas mounted on board	Based on a study from life done in 1824	
	mid-19th century	Washington Bogart Cooper	Grand Lodge of Tennessee	Oil on canvas	Washington Cooper was commissioned to paint many of the Grand Masters of Tennessee at this time.	
	1861		George Peter Alexander Healy	National Portrait Gallery	Oil on canvas	Copied from the original work painted from life.

== Notable engravings and lithographs ==
Image	Date	Artist	Notes
	?	James Barton Longacre	"After Sully"
	?	James Barton Longacre	"After J. Wood"
	?	James Barton Longacre	"After Earl, 1826"
	September 28, 1829	James Barton Longacre	"Drawn from life"
	c. 1835		Lithograph
	1845	Currier & Ives	Lithograph, posthumous
		U.S. Bureau of Engraving and Printing	

== Miscellaneous ==
Image	Date	Artist	Institution	Notes
	1828	William James Hubard	Tennessee State Museum	Cut-paper silhouette
	c. 1831	Louisa Catherine Strobel	The Hermitage	After she died, Jackson carried around this miniature of Rachel by Strobel after Ralph E. W. Earl.
	1856	Charles F. Fisher	Historic New Orleans Collection	Jackson in a cloak and a top hat "instead of the cocked hat or chapeau-bras" usually depicted as his headgear at the Battle of New Orleans, said to be "the precise costum [sic] which he wore at the battle of New Orleans;" a similar hat appears in Earl's Tennessee Gentleman portrait and according to biographer Robert V. Remini, "the large beaver hat" was where he kept "notes and memoranda" as he traveled

== See also ==
- List of memorials to Andrew Jackson
- List of presidents of the United States on currency
- Presidents of the United States on U.S. postage stamps
- Confederate States dollar § Complete typeset of CSA banknotes
- Portraits of presidents of the United States

== Sources ==
- "Senate Art" (PDF). govinfo.gov.
- Cheathem, Mark R. (2014). Andrew Jackson, Southerner. Baton Rouge, Louisiana: Louisiana State University Press. ISBN 978-0-8071-5099-3. LCCN 2012049695. OCLC 858995561. Project MUSE book 26506.
- Goff, Reda C. (1969). "A Physical Profile of Andrew Jackson". Tennessee Historical Quarterly. 28 (3): 297–309. ISSN 0040-3261.
- Jackson, Andrew (1994). Moser, Harold; Hoth, David; Hoemann, George (eds.). The Papers of Andrew Jackson: Volume IV, 1816–1820. University of Tennessee Press. doi:10.7290/utp8684. ISBN 978-0-87049-778-0.
- Remini, Robert V. (1977). Andrew Jackson and the Course of American Empire, 1767–1821. New York: Harper & Row. ISBN 978-0-8018-5912-0. LCCN 77003766. OCLC 1145801830.
- Sellers, Charles Grier Jr. (1957). James K. Polk: Jacksonian, 1795–1843. Princeton Legacy Library No. 2226. Princeton, New Jersey: Princeton University Press. doi:10.1515/9781400877881. ISBN 9781400877881. JSTOR j.ctt183pq15. LCCN 57005457. OCLC 979595704.
- Stephens, Rachel (2018). Selling Andrew Jackson: Ralph E. W. Earl and the Politics of Portraiture. Columbia, South Carolina: University of South Carolina Press. ISBN 978-1-6111-7867-8. LCCN 2017041622. OCLC 1023818256. Project MUSE book 59054.
