= Nehemiah Strong =

American astronomer and meteorologist

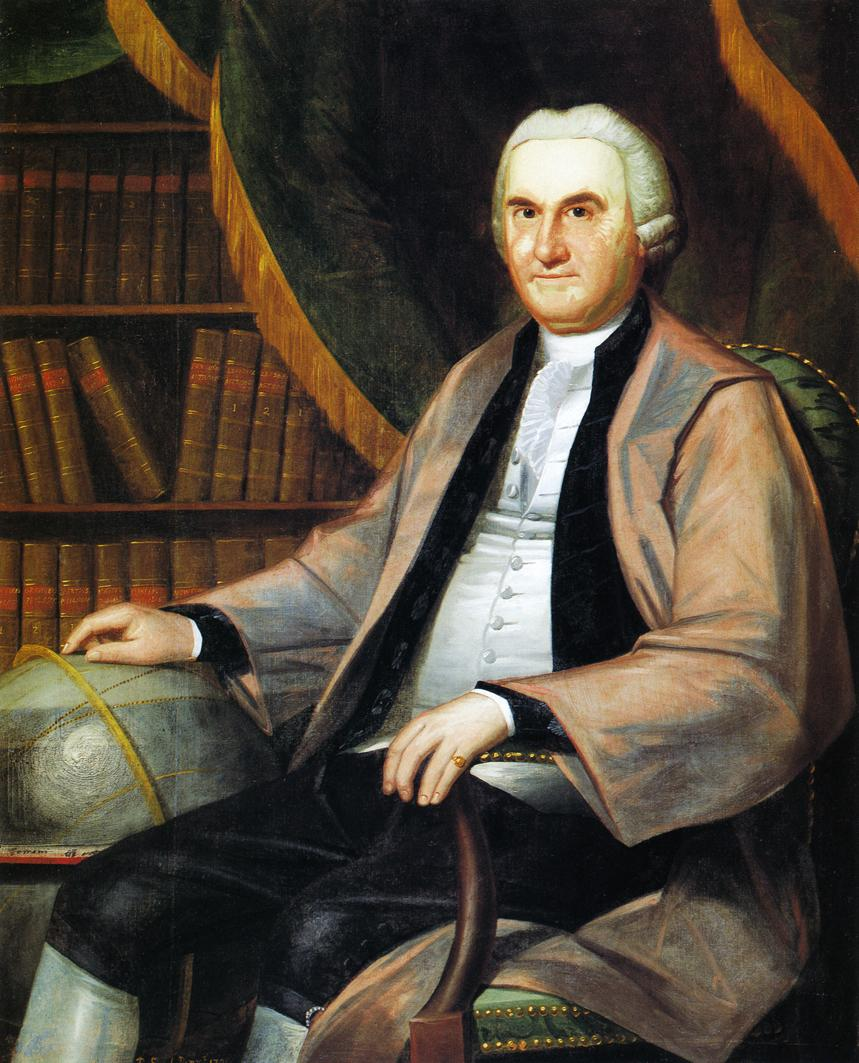
- Rev. Nehemiah Strong, oil on canvas, Ralph Earl, 1790. Yale University Art Gallery
- Born: 24 February 1729; Northampton, Massachusetts
- Died: 13 August 1807 (aged 78)
- Education: Yale College
- Occupations: Astronomer and meteorologist
- Relatives: Simeon Strong (brother)

Rev. Nehemiah Strong (24 February 1729 (N.S.) – 13 August 1807) was an American astronomer and meteorologist who was the first Professor of Mathematics and Natural Philosophy at Yale College from 1770 and produced a series of annual ephemerides, the astronomical element in almanacs, which were printed in Hartford, Connecticut, and in New Haven.

Strong was born in Northampton, Massachusetts, eldest of three children of Nehemiah and Hannah Strong and the grandson of Samuel and Esther (Clapp) Strong, of Northampton, Massachusetts.

Nehemiah Strong graduated from Yale College in 1755. He entered on a tutorship at Yale in November 1757 and was soon licensed to preach and was settled Congregationalist minister at Turkey Hill, now part of East Granby, Connecticut, 1761–67.

His marriage to Lydia Smith proved to be an embarrassment, when after she had been granted a divorce in February 1759 on grounds of abandonment, her husband, Andrew Burr Jr of New Haven, having gone to the West Indies in January 1755, Burr reappeared and her marriage to Nehemiah Strong was necessarily annulled, and as a result of entanglements he was dismissed from his pastorate at Turkey Hill, 23 June 1767. He married Mrs Mary Thomas, the widow of Dr Lemuel Thomas of Newtown, 15 June 1778.

Thereafter he resided in Newtown, in New Milford, where he kept an academy for boys, and, from 1803 in Bridgeport, giving occasional sermons and teaching to the time of his death. He resigned his chair at Yale in 1781, in a dispute over his salary, exacerbated by the sense on the part of the Corporation that he was not a sufficiently ardent Patriot. He represented Newtown in the Connecticut General Assembly, May 1784. His portrait by Ralph Earl, painted in 1789–90, was presented to Yale by the artist and remains in the university's collection.

His treatise on astronomy won him such a wide reputation that anonymous almanacs were attributed to him. His first essay at compiling an almanac was anonymous, for Watson's Register for 1775, printed at Hartford; his second essay was The Connecticut Almanack for 1778, which identified his Yale title only. From 1782 he published almanacs under his own name at Hartford and as "Hosea Stafford" in New Haven (1776–1804). In addition, finding that he was publicly assumed to be the "Isaac Bickerstaff", having disclaimed authorship in a letter to the Connecticut Journal, New Haven, 27 October 1784, he apparently decided to take up the slack and issue almanacs as "Bickerstaff" himself: they appeared at Hartford for several years after 1785.

In a letter of 6 May 1803 to Elisha Babcock, Strong remarks that the calculations for the forthcoming year will be his last:

I am pretty well Tired of the Business. For 29 years past I have Successively furnished one or more Copies for Printer; generally two, sometimes three in a year. And I think I have done my Part. Tis an Elaborate fatiguing Business, and requires the closest care and Attention to do the Business with proper accuracy, and takes a large Portion of my Time.

He recommended his pupil David Sanford of Newtown, Connecticut.
