= Tennessee State Museum =

Museum in Tennessee, US

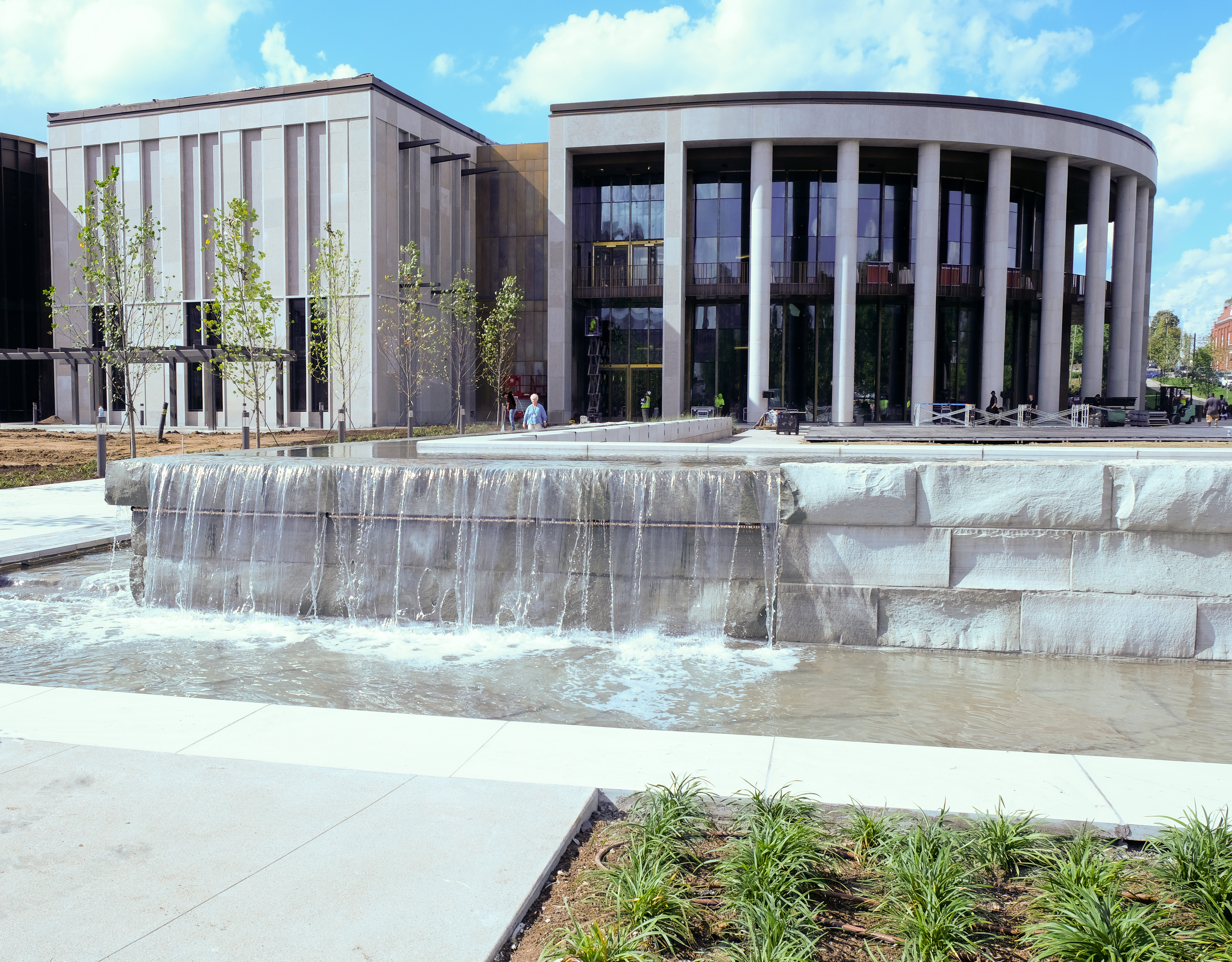
- Entrance to the Tennessee State Museum
- Established: 1937
- Location: 1000 Rosa L. Parks Blvd; Nashville, Tennessee
- Coordinates: 36°10′21″N 86°47′24″W
- Type: Heritage center
- Director: Ashley Howell
- Curator: Richard White
- Website: http://www.tnmuseum.org

The Tennessee State Museum is a large museum in Nashville depicting the history of the U.S. state of Tennessee. The current facility opened on October 4, 2018, at the corner of Rosa Parks Boulevard and Jefferson Street at the foot of Capitol Hill by the Bicentennial Capitol Mall State Park. The 137,000-square-foot building includes a Tennessee Time Tunnel chronicling the state's history by leading visitors though the museum's permanent collection, a hands-on children's gallery, six rotating galleries, a digital learning center, and a two-story Grand Hall. Exhibitions include significant artifacts related to the state's history, along with displays of art, furniture, textiles, and photographs produced by Tennesseans. The museum's Civil War holdings consists of uniforms, battle flags, and weapons. There is no admission charge for visitors.

Museum operations and policies are overseen by the Douglas Henry State Museum Commission, a group of citizens appointed to represent the public interest.

== History ==
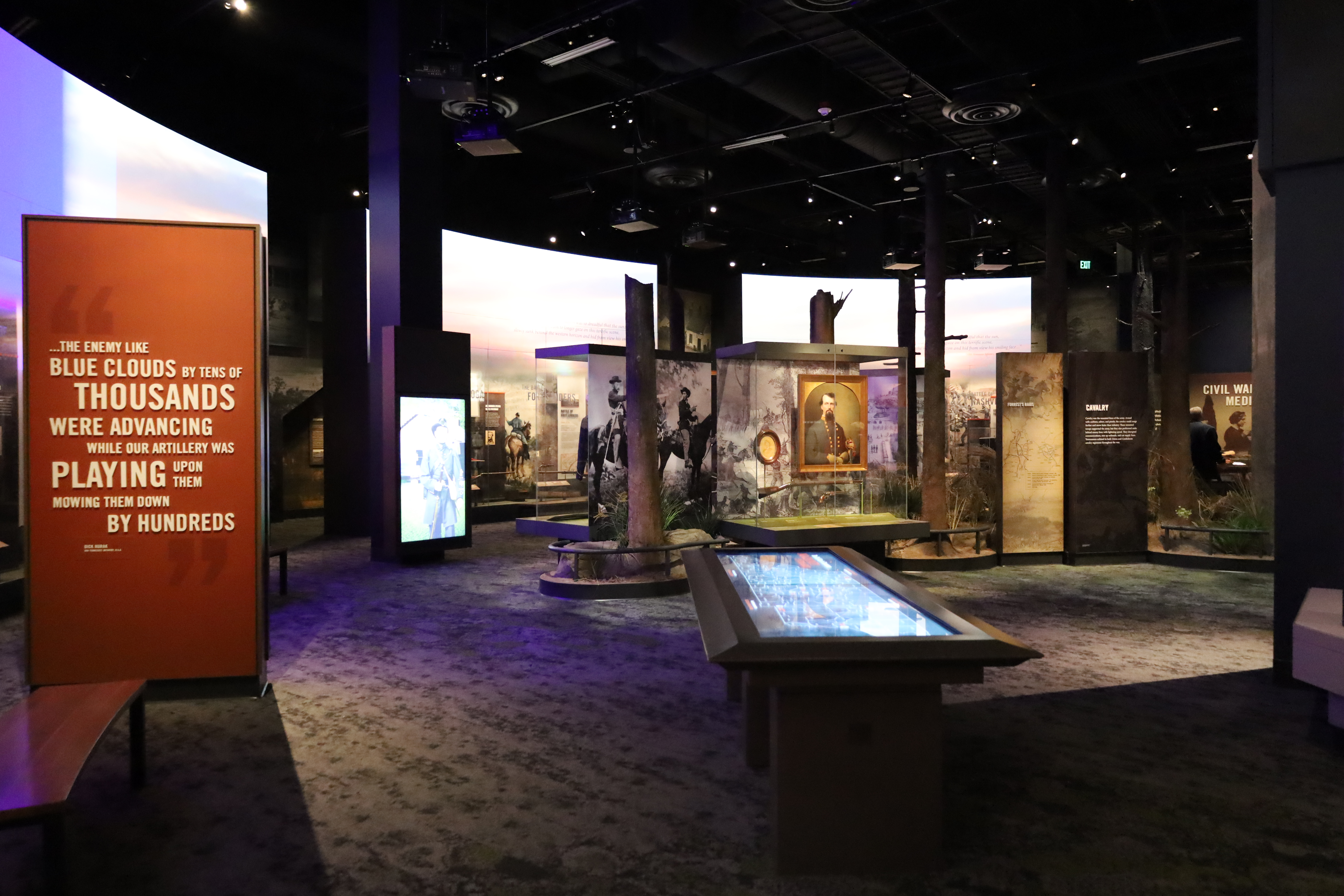
Displays inside the museum in 2022

The earliest known museum in Tennessee dates to 1817 when a portrait artist, Ralph E. W. Earl, opened a museum at the public square of Nashville. The state museum opened in 1937 in the War Memorial Building, after being authorized by the General Assembly. It decided that the state needed a museum to deal with various collections from the state and mementos from World War I. Most of the museum operations moved to the James K. Polk Building in 1981, which it shared with the Tennessee Performing Arts Center through May 2018.

The museum in the Polk Building exhibited a variety of paintings, silver, weapons, and furniture. Larger exhibits included reproductions of a historic print shop, a painting gallery, and a grist mill. The state museum featured a museum store offering handmade crafts, jewelry, and Tennessee memorabilia.

The Military Museum, focused on overseas wars, is still housed in the War Memorial Building across the street. Its exhibits range from Tennessee participation in the early battles of the Spanish–American War to World War II.

The new Tennessee State Museum opened in October 2018 at the corner of Rosa Parks Boulevard and Jefferson Street at the foot of Capitol Hill by the Bicentennial Capitol Mall State Park. 137,000-square-foot facility is one of the largest in the nation.

The museum also owns the Lorraine Motel in Memphis, Tennessee, part of the non-profit, privately owned museum complex of the National Civil Rights Museum. It leases the motel to the Lorraine Motel Civil Rights Museum Foundation on a long-term basis to be operated as part of the museum complex. Under the terms of its 20-year lease made in 2007, the Tennessee State Museum reserves responsibility for major maintenance of the Lorraine Motel. The Foundation owns and operates the other buildings and properties associated with the complex. Certain parts of the motel have been preserved for their historic aspects related to the assassination of Martin Luther King Jr. in 1968.
