= Simeon Strong =

American judge

Associate Justice of the Massachusetts Supreme Judicial Court
- In office 1801–1805

Personal details
- Born: March 6, 1736 Amherst, Province of Massachusetts
- Died: December 14, 1805 (aged 69)
- Spouse: Sarah Wright (m. 1763)
- Relatives: Nehemiah Strong (brother); Henry W. Strong (grandson); Marshall Strong (grandson)
- Education: Yale College

Simeon Strong (1736–1805) was a justice of the Massachusetts Supreme Judicial Court.

== Biography ==
Simeon Strong was the son of Nehemiah Strong and Hannah French. He was born in Amherst, Province of Massachusetts on March 6, 1736, and graduated from Yale College in 1756. He studied Christian theology and preached in various locations in Massachusetts. Strong then studied law and was sworn as an attorney in 1761. Strong became a well-known attorney and practiced in Amherst. He was selected as a representative to the General Court (1767-9), Massachusetts State Senate (1793) and justice of the Supreme Judicial Court of Massachusetts (1800–05). He married Sarah Wright on January 12, 1763 (1739/40-1783). Strong died on December 14, 1805, aged 69.

New York State Senator Henry W. Strong (1810–1848) and President of the Wisconsin Territorial Council Marshall Mason Strong (1813–1864) were his grandsons.

Legal offices
New seat	Associate Justice of the Massachusetts Supreme Judicial Court; 1801-1805	Succeeded by Isaac Parker
