= Ralph Eleaser Whiteside Earl =

American painter

- Born: 1785–1788
- Died: September 16, 1838 (aged 49-53); Nashville, Tennessee
- Occupation: Painter
- Spouse: Jane Caffery
- Parent(s): Ralph Earl; Ann Whiteside

Ralph Eleaser Whiteside Earl (1785–1788 – September 16, 1838), was an American painter known as the "court painter" to President Andrew Jackson. He also painted the portrait of Rachel Jackson.

== Biography ==
Earl was the son of portrait painter Ralph Earl and his second wife Ann Whiteside, and thus a member of the prominent Earle family. He was born c. 1785–1788, probably in New York City, and likely received his early training in portraiture from his father, whose naive style is reflected in the younger Earl's earliest works. He traveled to London in 1809, where he studied for a year with John Trumbull and was advised by Benjamin West to learn perspective, anatomy, and three-dimensional illusion. He remained in England until 1814, living with his maternal grandfather and uncle in Norwich and executing portrait commissions. He then traveled to Paris before returning to the United States in December 1815 to create grand-scale history paintings on the European model.

As preparation for a planned project depicting the Battle of New Orleans, Earl met General Andrew Jackson and visited him at his Tennessee home, The Hermitage, in January 1817. Earl painted portraits of Jackson and his family and married Mrs. Jackson's niece Jane Caffery on May 19, 1819. She died in childbirth in 1820, as did their son.

After his wife's death, Earl became Jackson's close friend and lived with him at The Hermitage. When Jackson became president in 1829, Earl accompanied him to the White House, painting so many portraits of Jackson that he became known as the "Court Painter" and "the King's painter". Earl returned to Tennessee with Jackson after his second term of office and died at The Hermitage on September 16, 1838.

== Tennessee career and cultural contributions ==
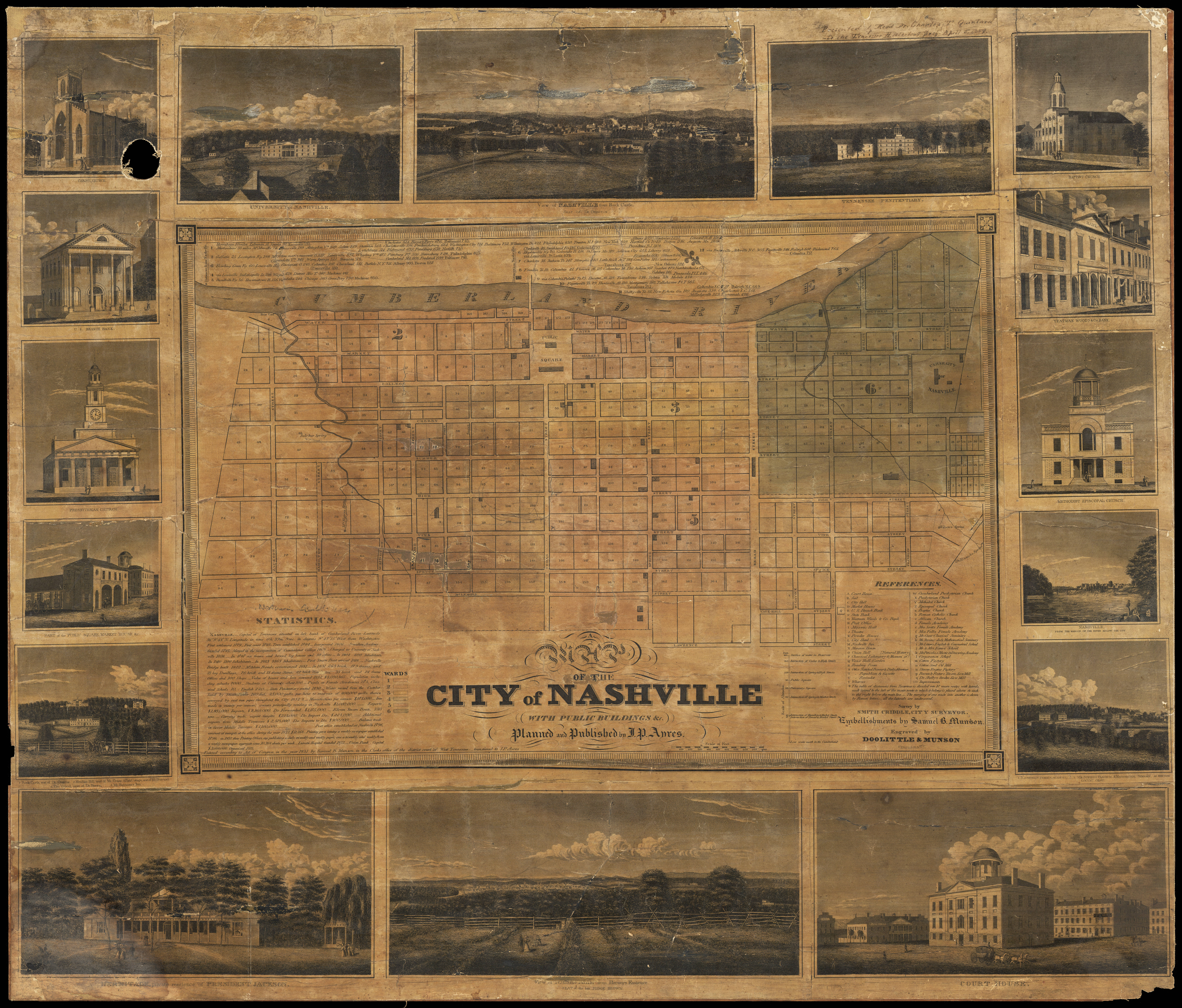
An early, detailed map of Nashville showing the street grid, public buildings referenced in a key, the Cumberland River, and surrounding engravings of prominent city landmarks.

Upon arriving in Tennessee in 1817, Earl established himself as the state's first resident professional artist. His explicit goal was to paint portraits of Andrew Jackson and other regional military heroes like John Coffee and William Carroll, capitalizing on their fame after the War of 1812. Earl quickly found success, securing numerous commissions. His 1817 records show that he had eighty-six portraits commissioned, earning him a significant income of $4,115 and demonstrating a newfound increasing demand for art in Nashville. Unlike other artists in Tennessee, his portraits often focused more on the sitter's attire and individual character than on elaborate backgrounds. This stylistic choice distinguished his regional work.

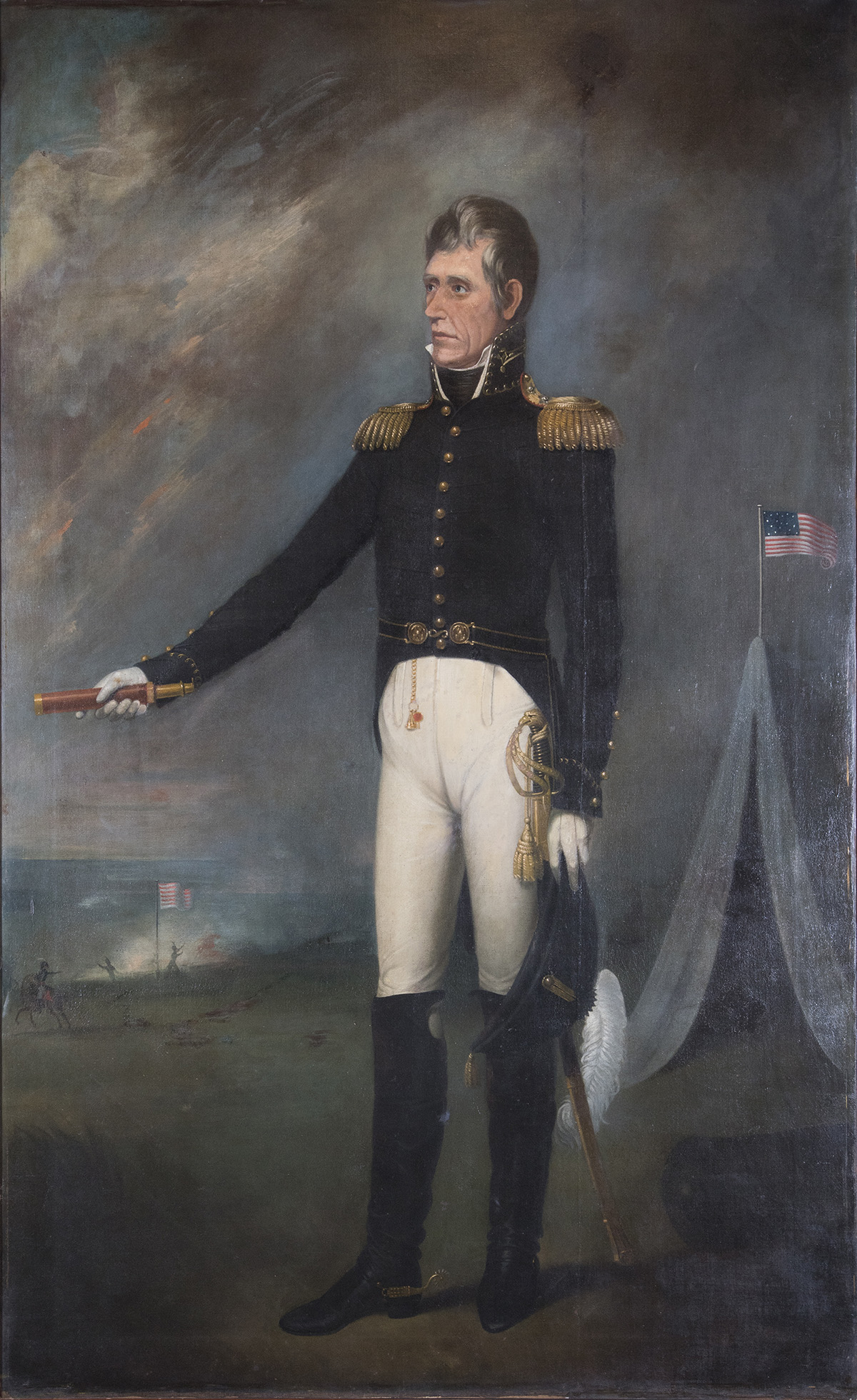
Earl's 1817 portrait of Andrew Jackson highlights his focus on detailed attire and individual character.

Earl's portraiture, especially of Andrew Jackson, carried significant political influence. Many depictions of Jackson were painted specifically to improve his public image and advance his political goals, effectively serving as visual propaganda, particularly during election campaigns. His early works, such as the 1818 Portrait of General Andrew Jackson, emphasized Jackson's military leadership following the War of 1812, depicting him in uniform with symbols of command like a baton and a tented military camp in the background, thereby strengthening his image as a national hero. As Jackson's political career progressed, Earl became his near-constant companion and 'Court Painter,' producing numerous portraits, many large-scale or life-sized for public display, that conveyed presidential authority and dignity, reinforcing Jackson's status and presence on the national stage. These works were instrumental in shaping Jackson's public persona. This use of portraiture extended to Jackson's family. For example, Earl depicted Rachel Jackson in fine clothing and jewelry, presenting her as a respectable and elegant lady to counter political attacks during the 1828 campaign; he considered his 1826 portrait of her the "most correct likeness" and authorized its engraving for wider distribution. Jackson hung Earl's portraits in the White House as reminders of his family and used them to strengthen his national respectability. Additionally, Earl's presence and success were instrumental in forging a sustainable art market in Nashville, creating a foundation for future generations of Tennessee artists.

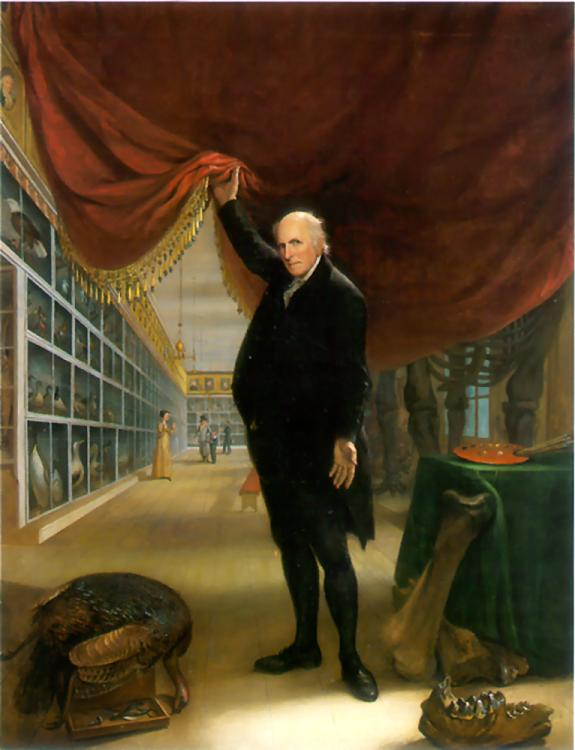
Charles Willson Peale unveils his Philadelphia Museum (1784), featuring art and natural history.This inspired Earl to found his own museum in 1818.

Beyond painting, Earl made significant contributions to Nashville's cultural development through his interest in museum work and natural history, reflecting the ideals of the American Enlightenment. In 1818, inspired by the example of Charles Willson Peale’s Philadelphia Museum, Earl founded the Nashville Museum. This institution, the first of its kind in the region, aimed to educate the public, improve educational opportunities, expand knowledge, and enhance the state’s reputation. Earl envisioned it as a place to “illustrate the works of nature, stimulate inventive genius, inform the imitative, and gratify curiosity.” The museum housed a diverse collection, including natural history specimens, mineral samples, Native American artifacts (some from Earl's own archaeological explorations in Tennessee), and his paintings. Earl actively sought items, undertaking the first archaeological excavations in Tennessee at sites like the Ward Mounds and Bledsoe's Lick, unearthing pottery, tools, and skeletal remains. He also co-founded the Tennessee Antiquarian Society in 1820, serving as its librarian and hosting its meetings at his museum. The society was dedicated to preserving state history and studying the “antiquities of the Western country,” eventually evolving into the Tennessee Historical Society. While intended to be republican and open to the public, the museum saw more attendance from the elite who could afford the admission fee instituted in 1822. Earl resigned from the museum directorship in January 1825, shifting his focus increasingly towards portraiture and his relationship with Jackson. Though the museum itself was short-lived, Earl's initiative marked him as a key cultural broker and entrepreneur in the early American West, contributing significantly to Nashville's burgeoning intellectual and cultural identity and setting precedents for museum development.

== Works ==
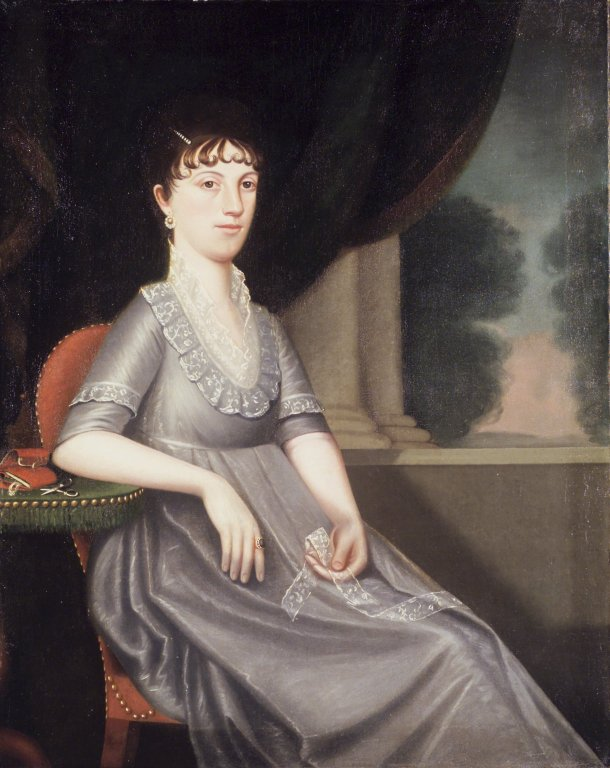
Portrait of Mrs. Ebenezer Porter, c. 1804

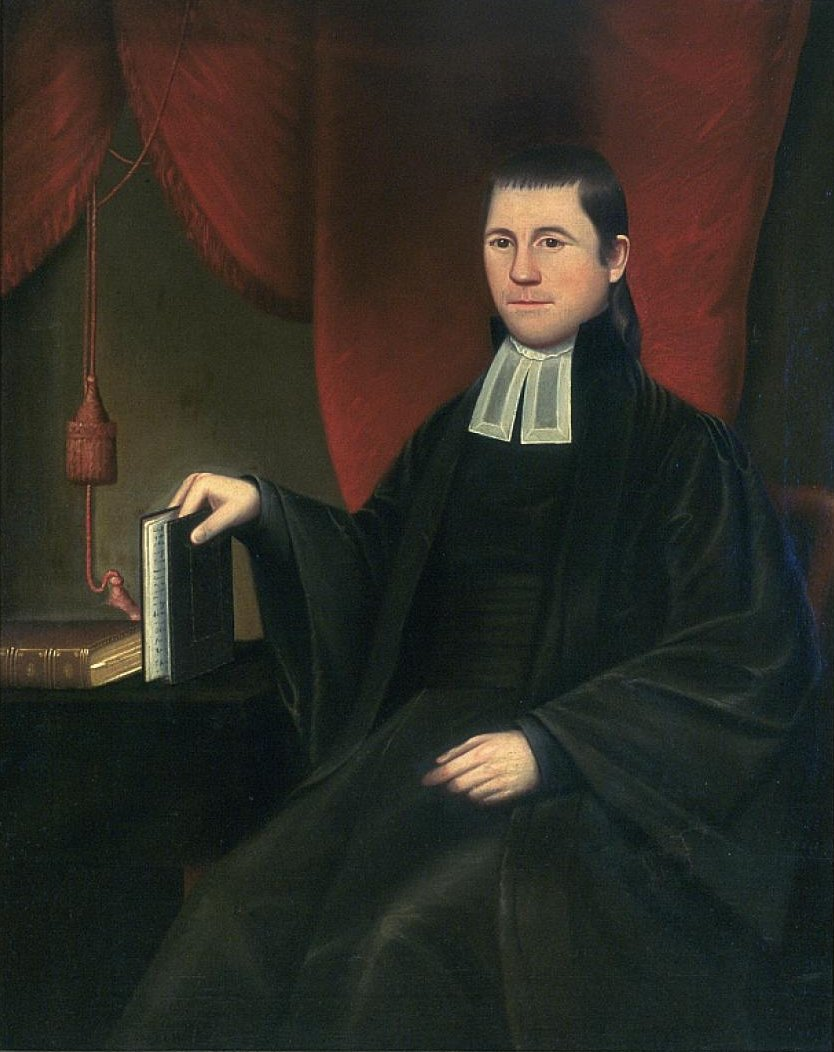
Portrait of Rev. Ebenezer Porter

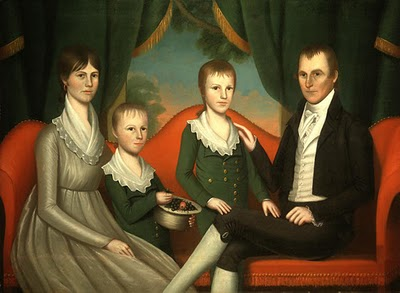
1804 Ralph Eleaser Whiteside Earl family portrait illustrates Earl's early work's stiff postures and naive style.

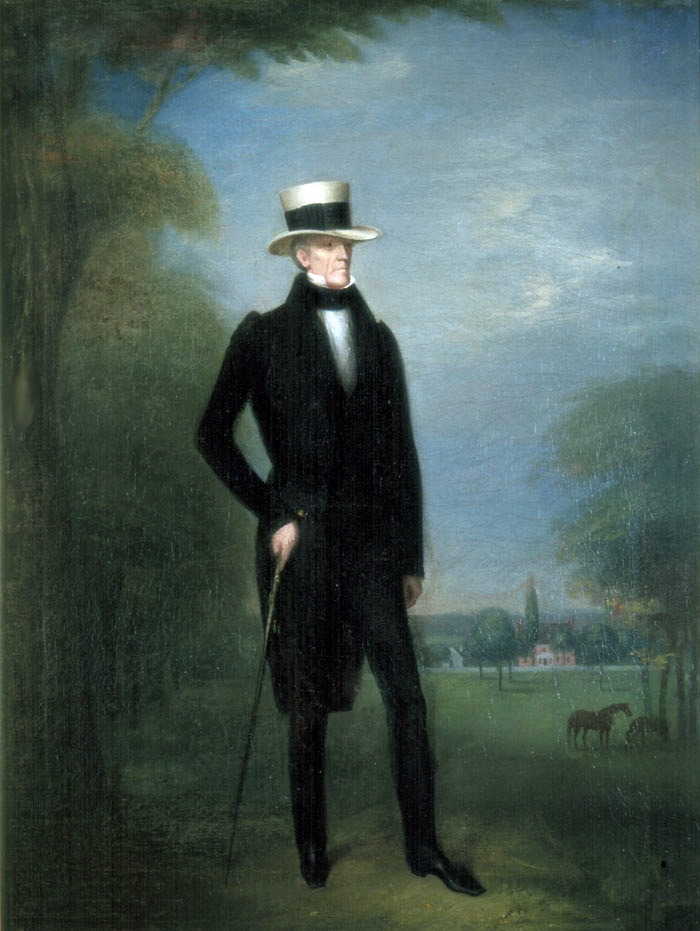
Gentleman portrait of Andrew Jackson, 1828–1831

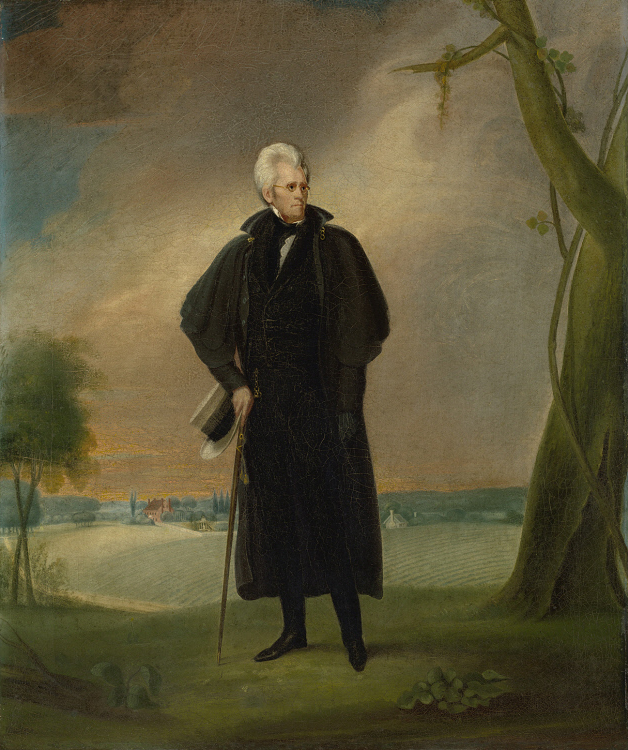
Andrew Jackson, 1830

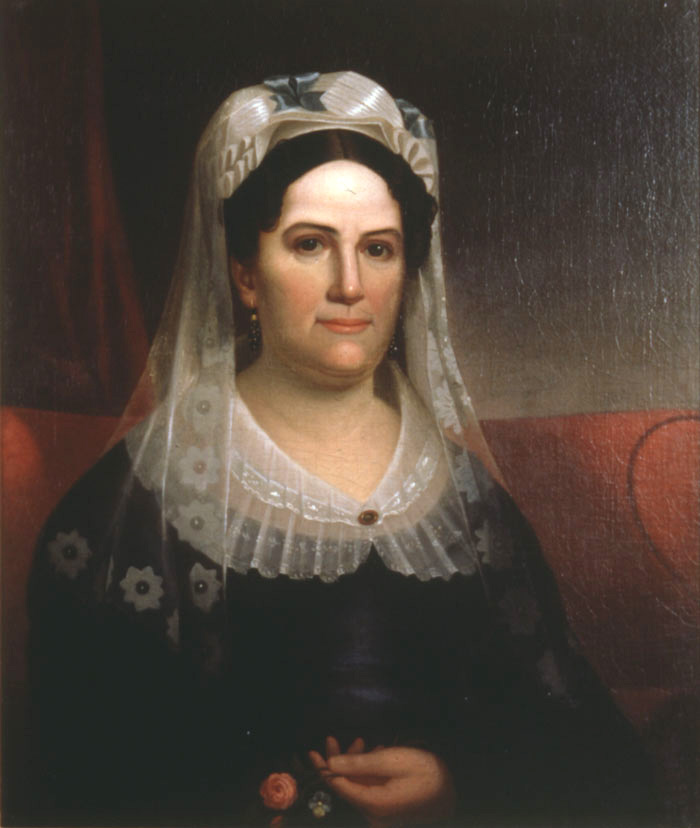
Portrait of Rachel Donelson Jackson (Mrs. Andrew Jackson) in Earl's mature style, c. 1830–1832

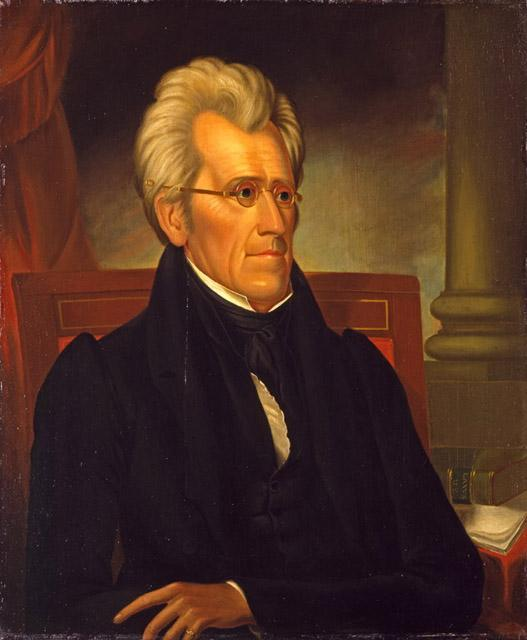
Portrait of President Andrew Jackson, c. 1830–1832

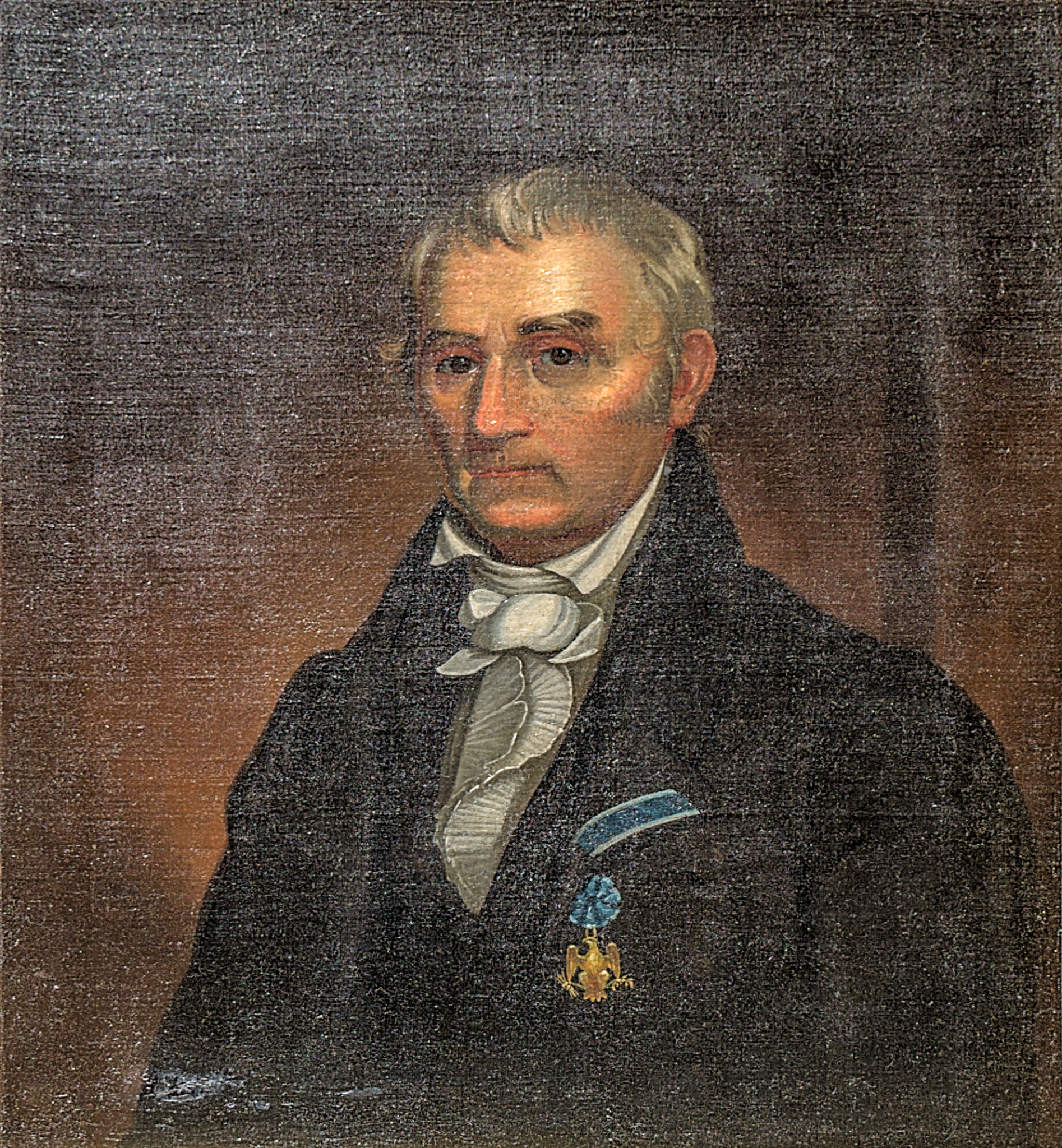
Portrait of Captain Willian Lytle, 1820s

== See also ==
- Portraits of Andrew Jackson
