= Ralph Earl =

American painter (1751–1801)

- Self-Portrait, c. 1784
- Born: May 11, 1751
- Died: August 16, 1801 (aged 50); Bolton, Connecticut
- Children: Ralph E. W. Earl
- Relatives: James Earl (brother)

Ralph Earl (May 11, 1751 – August 16, 1801) was an American artist known for his landscape paintings and numerous portraits.

== Early life ==
Ralph Earl was born on May 11, 1751, in either Shrewsbury or Leicester, Massachusetts, the oldest of four children of Ralph Earle and Phebe Whittemore Earl. By 1774, he was working in New Haven, Connecticut, as a portrait painter. In the autumn of 1774, Earl returned to Leicester, Massachusetts, to marry his cousin, Sarah Gates. A few months later, their daughter Phebe was born in January 1775. Earl left them both with Sarah's parents and returned to New Haven to continue painting portraits. Earl's wife and daughter joined him in New Haven in November 1776, and they lived there until May 1777, when their son, John, was born. Sarah later attested that this six-month period "was all the time we kept house together."

== Career ==
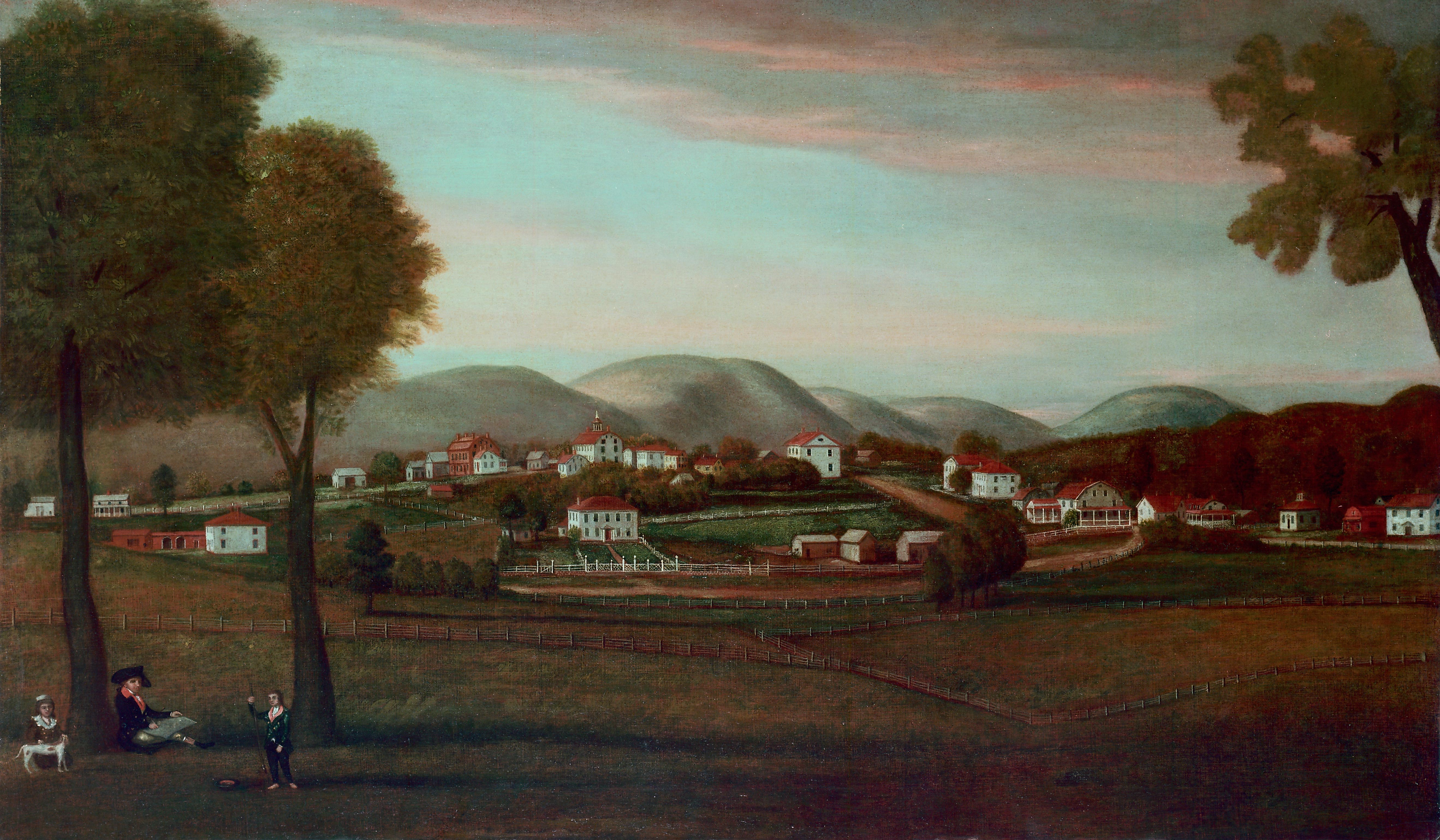
View of Bennington, c. 1798. Earl is seen sitting under a tree.

Like many of the colonial craftsmen, Earl was self-taught, and for many years was an itinerant painter. In 1775, Earl visited Lexington and Concord, which were the sites of recent battles in the American Revolution. Although his father was a colonel in the Revolutionary army, Earl himself was a Loyalist. Working in collaboration with the engraver Amos Doolittle, Earl drew four battle scenes that were made into pro-Revolutionary propaganda prints.

In 1778, he left behind his wife and daughter and escaped to England by disguising himself as the servant of British army captain John Money.

In London, he entered the studio of Benjamin West, and painted the king and many notables. Earl continued painting portraits in the town of Norwich. He later married Ann Whiteside, an English woman, despite the fact that he had never ended his marriage with Sarah Gates. In 1785 or 1786, Earl returned to the United States with his new wife.

=== Return to America ===
After his return to America, he made portraits of Timothy Dwight, Rev Nehemiah Strong, Roger Sherman, and other prominent men. He also painted a large picture of Niagara Falls.

In September 1786, while living in New York City, Earl was imprisoned for failing to pay his personal debts. Even while in jail, he drew portraits of his visitors, friends, and family of the Society for the Relief of Distressed Debtors. He was released in January 1788.

== Personal life ==
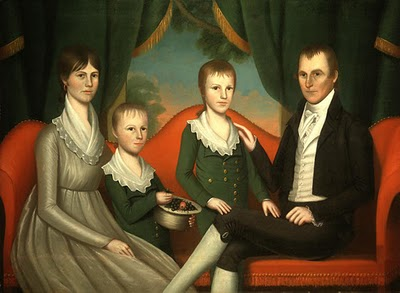
1804 Ralph Eleaser Whiteside Earl family portrait illustrates Earl's early work's stiff postures and naive style.

Earl probably trained his son, painter Ralph Eleaser Whiteside Earl, and was an influence on his nephew Augustus Earle who is reputed to have been the first European artist to have visited all five continents. Ralph's brother James Earl (1761–1796) was also a portrait painter.

He died in Bolton, Connecticut, on August 16, 1801, at age 50. Alcoholism is believed to be the main cause of death, as he struggled with it for many years.

=== Influence ===
Earl was also an influence on John Brewster, Jr.

== Gallery ==
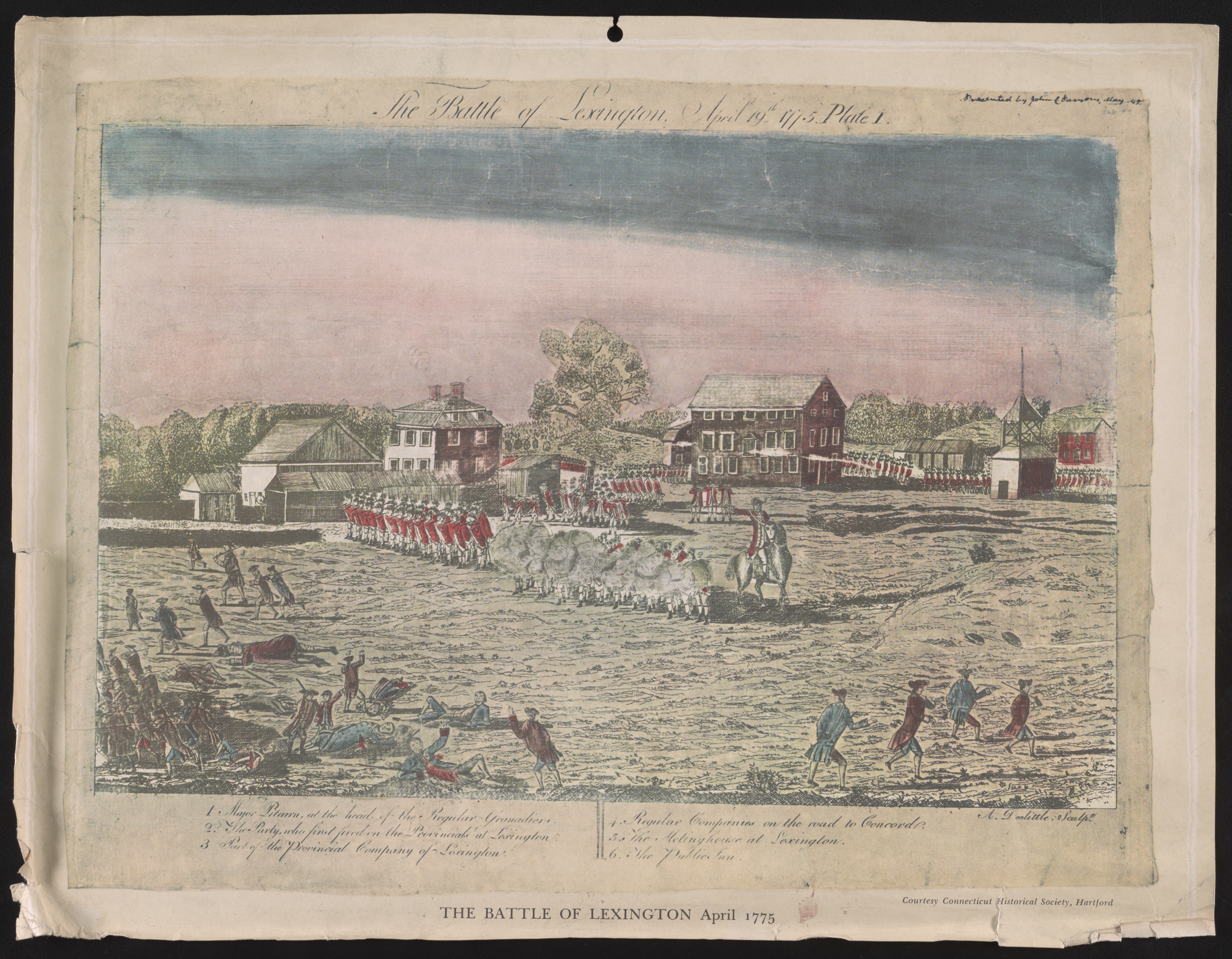
"The Battle of Lexington" plate 1 (1775)

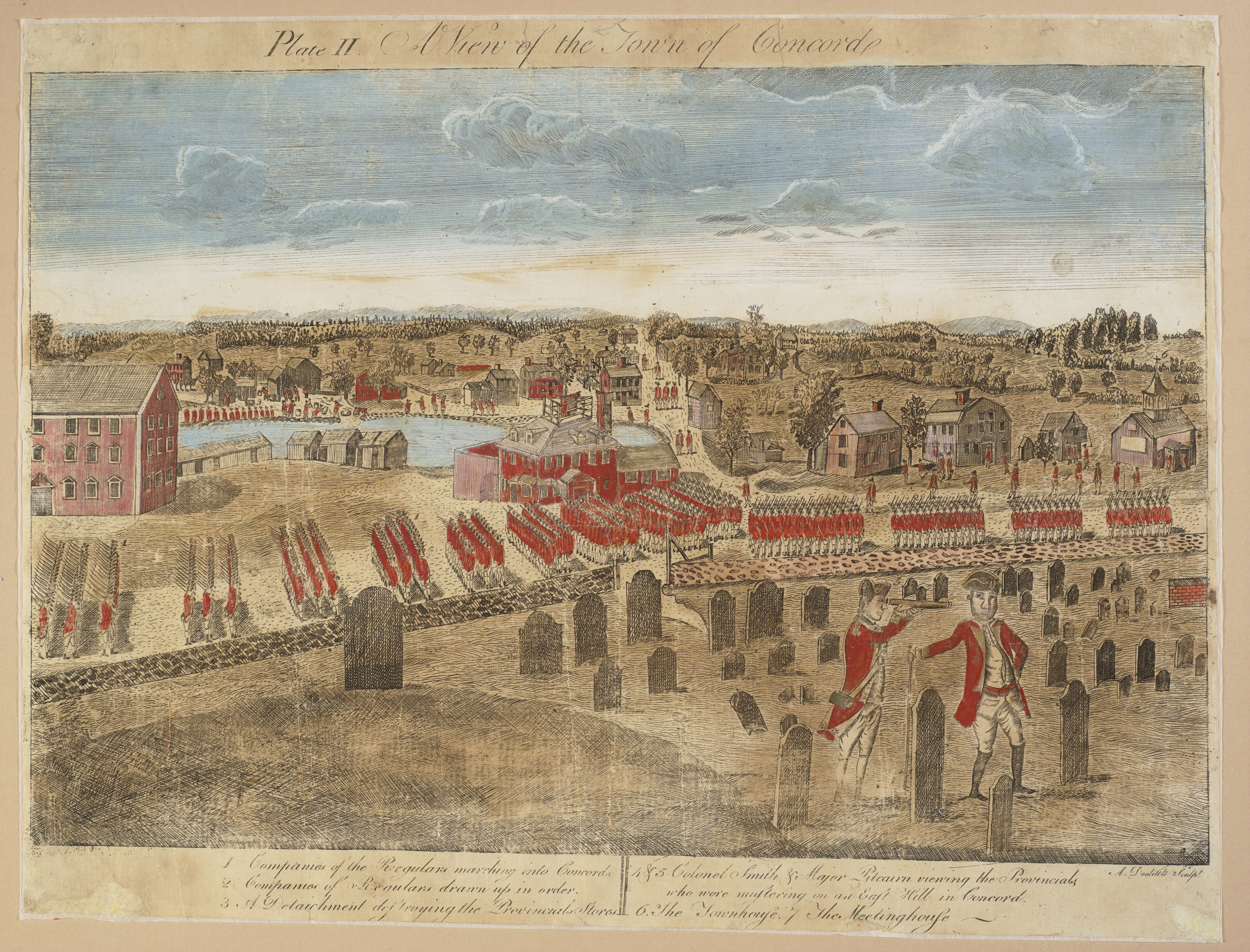
"A View of the Town of Concord" plate 2 (1775)

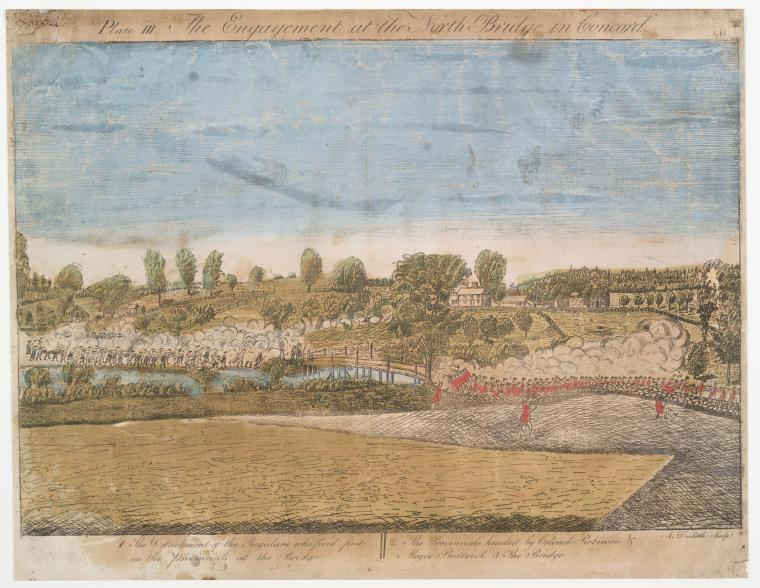
"The Engagement at the North Bridge at Concord" plate 3 (1775)

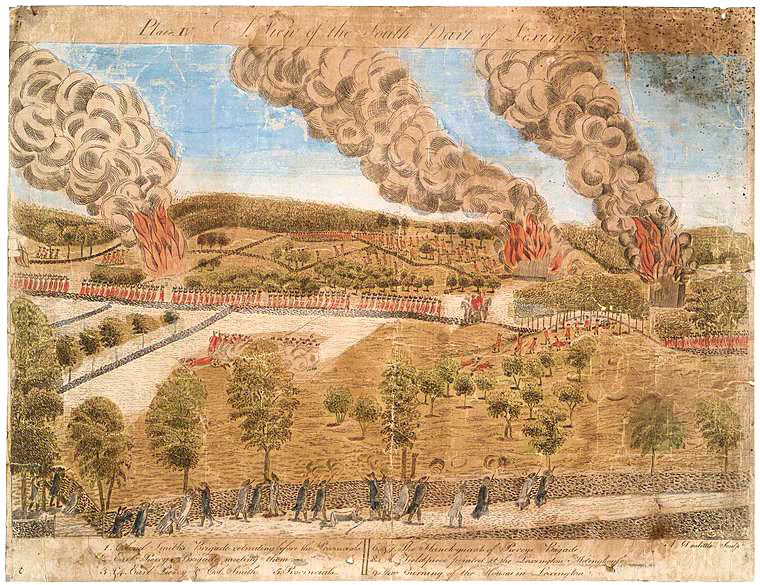
"A View of the South Part of Lexington" plate 4 (1775}
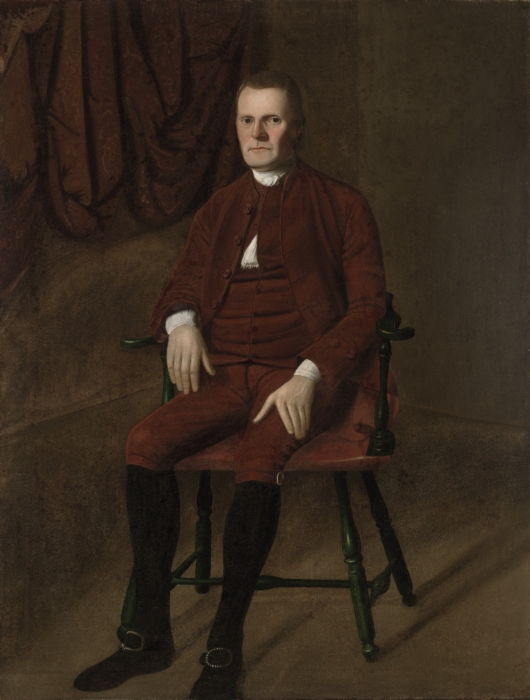
Roger Sherman.

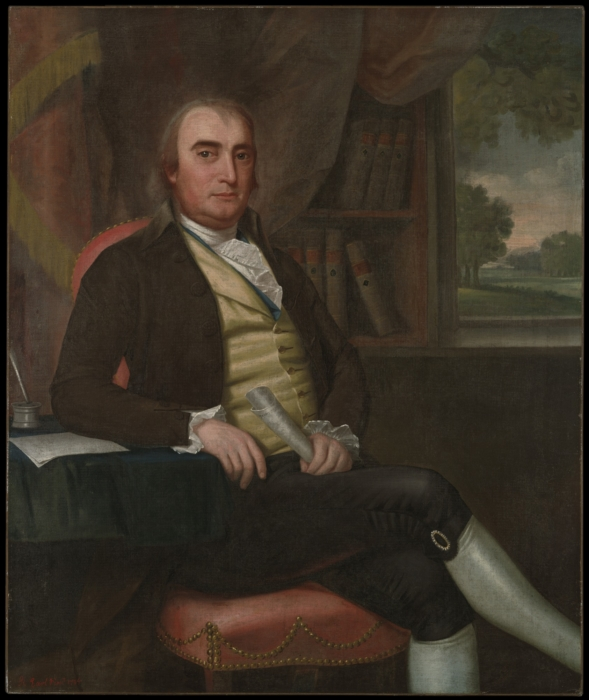
John Davenport 1794

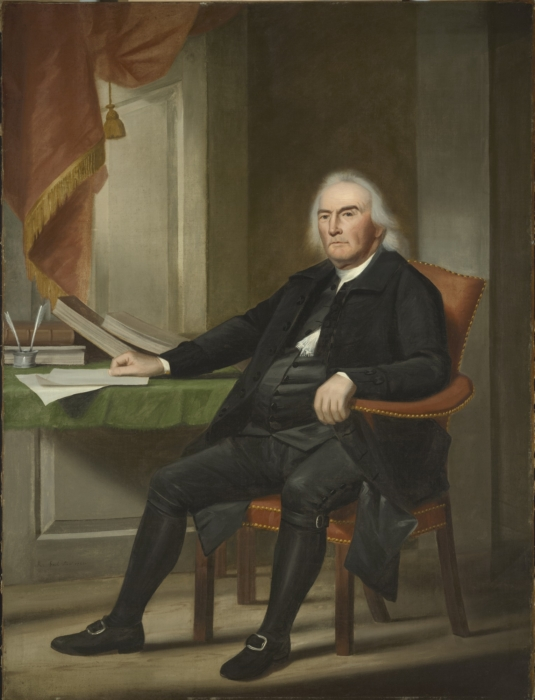
Abraham Davenport 1788

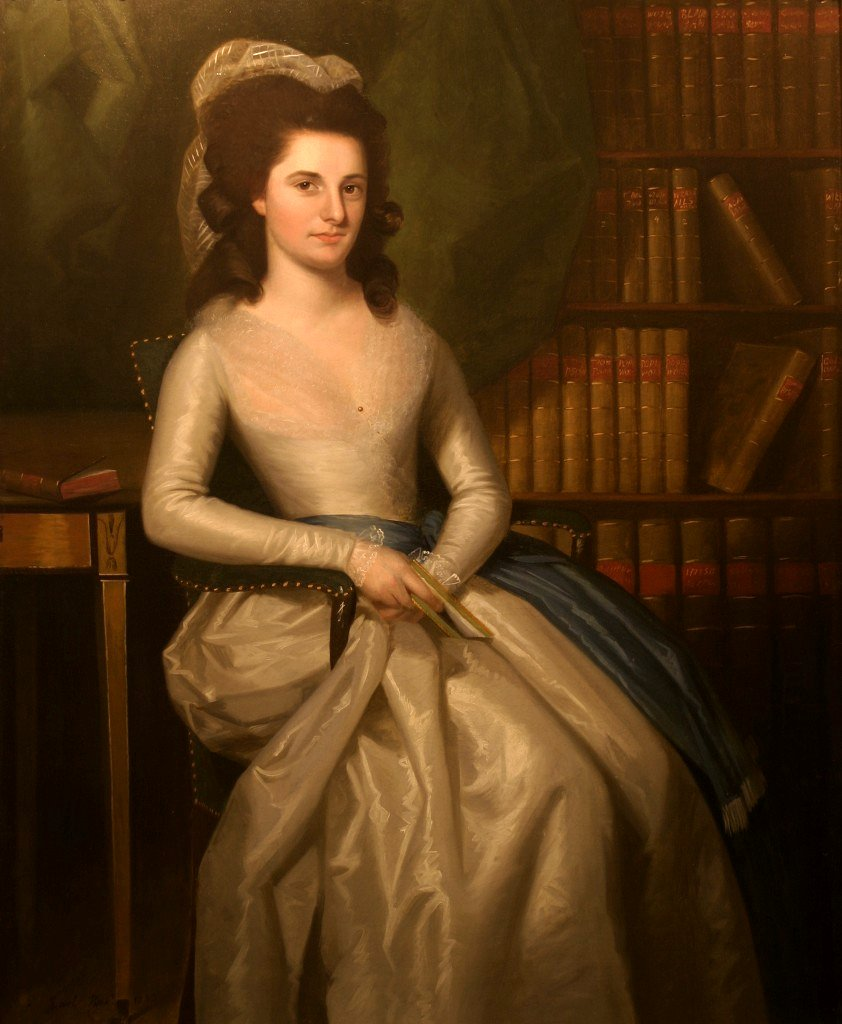
Portrait of Henriette Luard (1783) [wife of Peter Abraham Spooner]

A Master in Chancery Entering the House of Lords (1783) [Portrait of Edward Thurlow, 1st Baron Thurlow?)

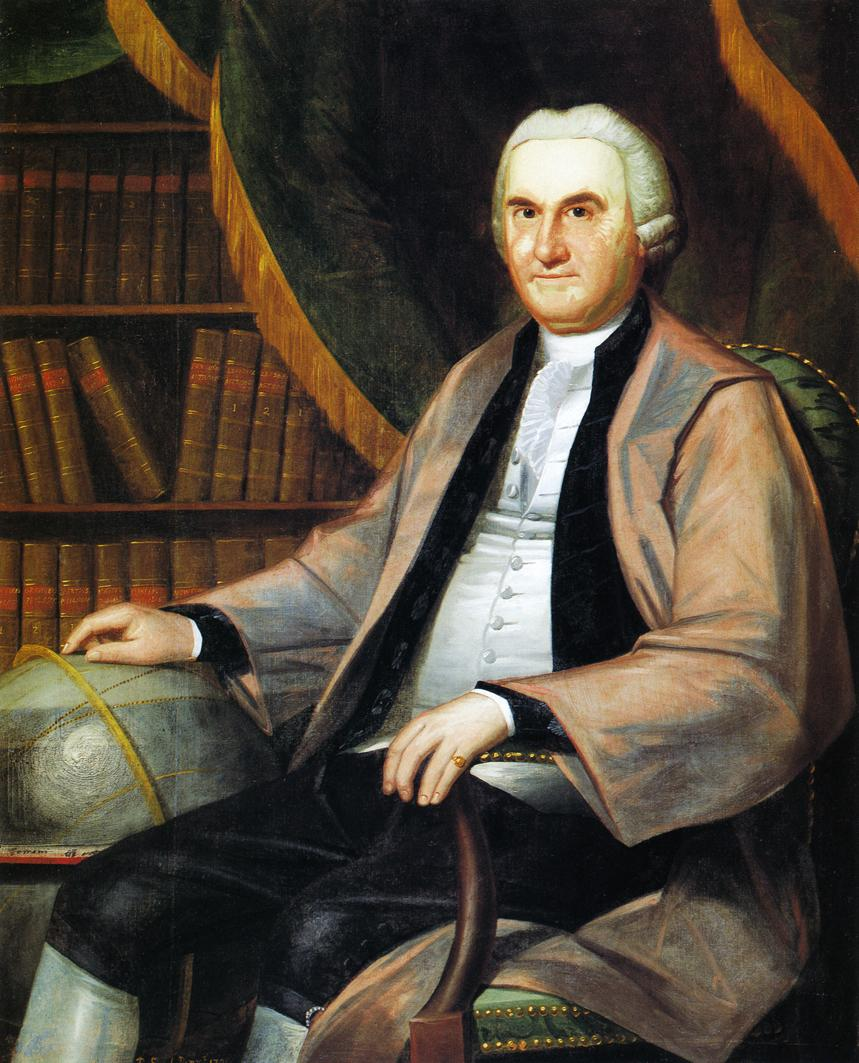
Rev Nehemiah Strong (1790)

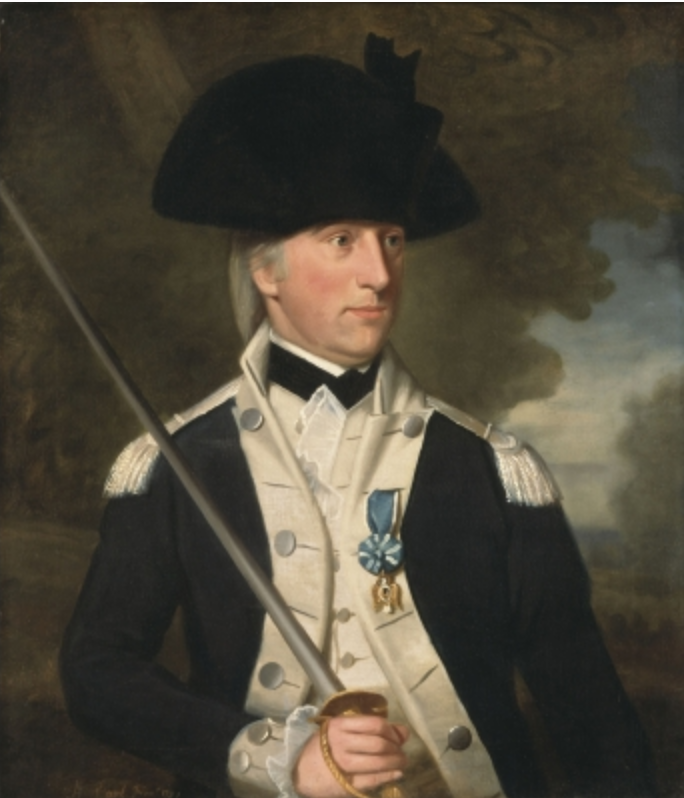
Richard Varick (c. 1787), Albany Institute of History & Art

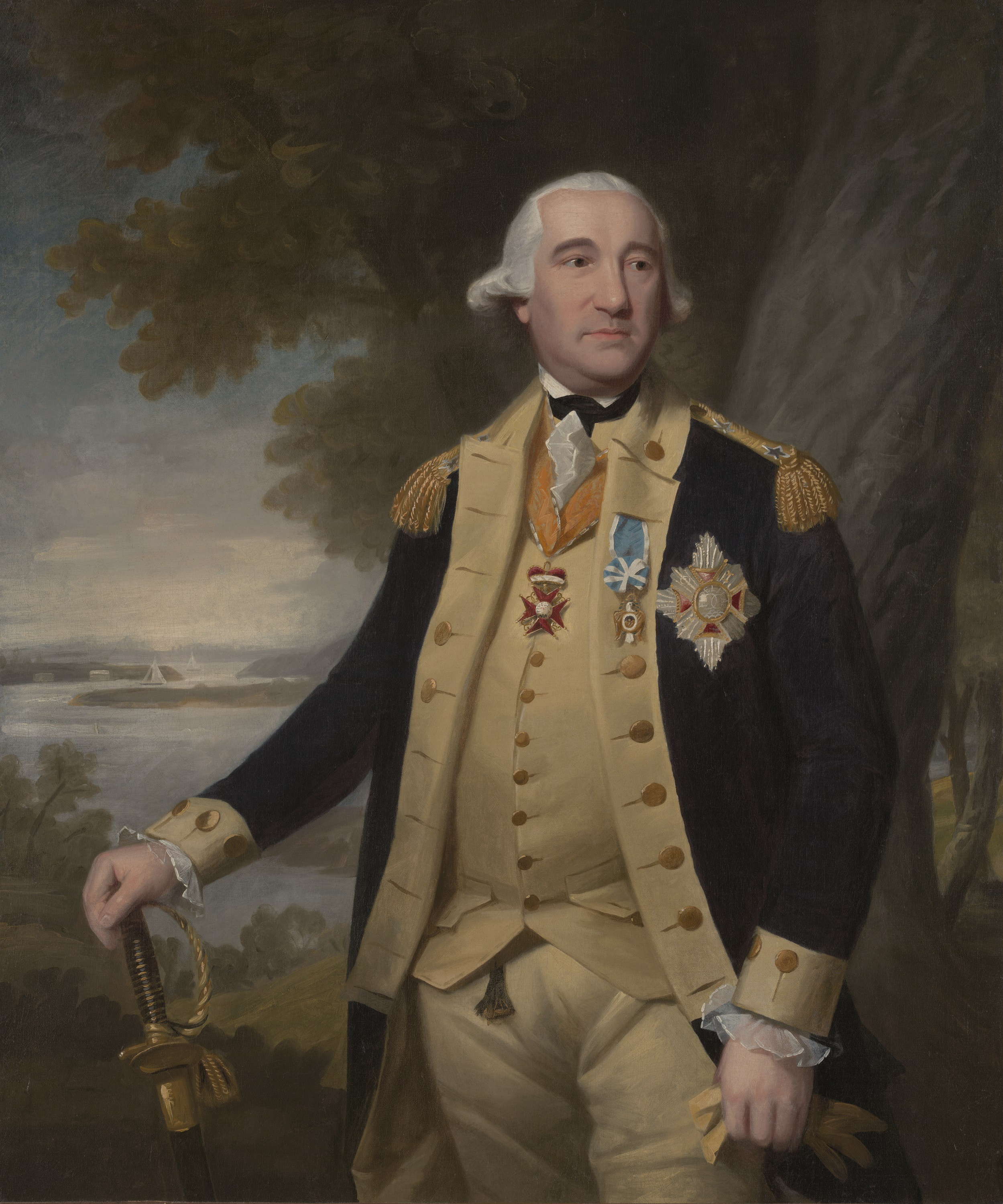
Portrait of Major General von Steuben wearing the badge of the Society of the Cincinnati (c. 1786)

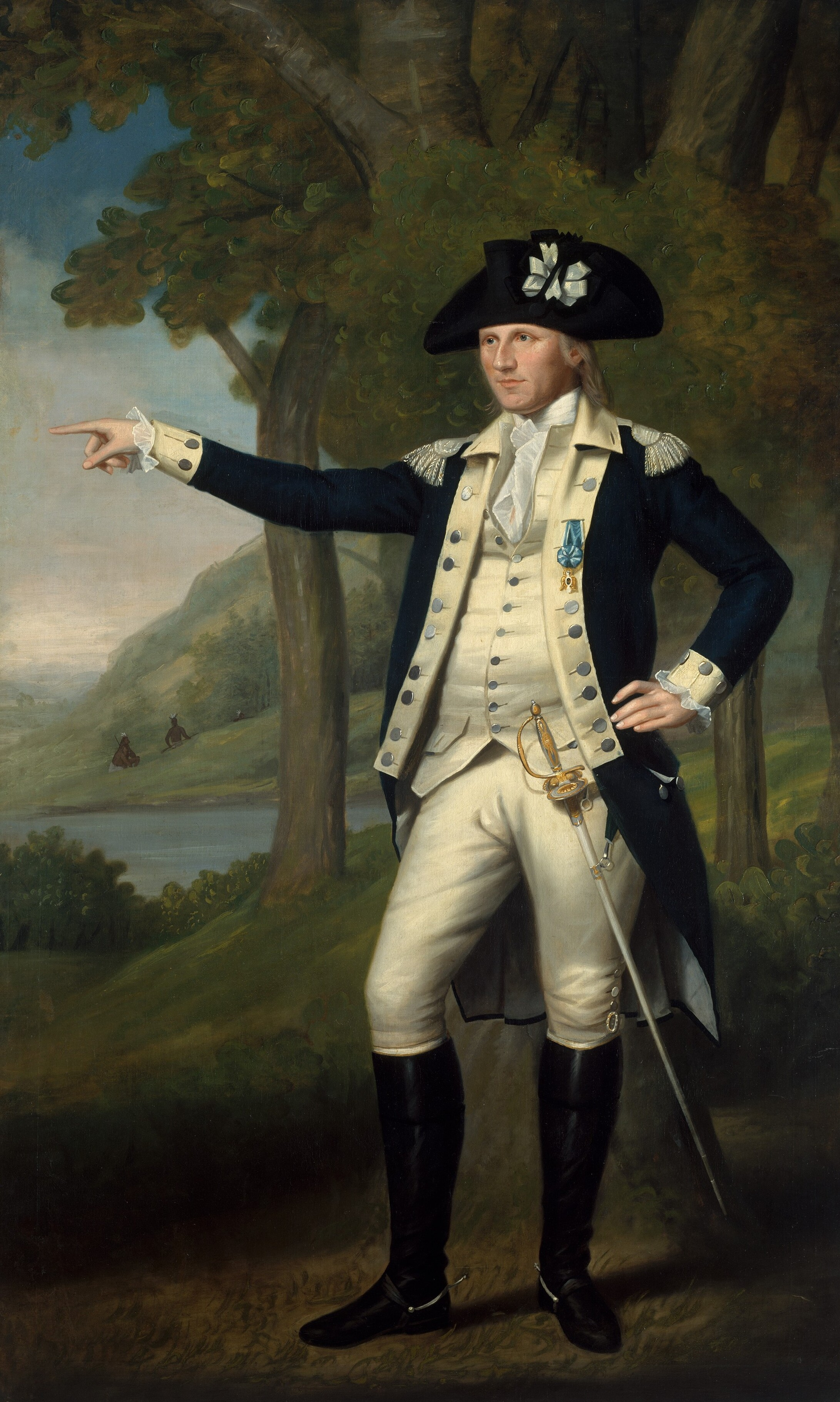
Marinus Willett (1791)

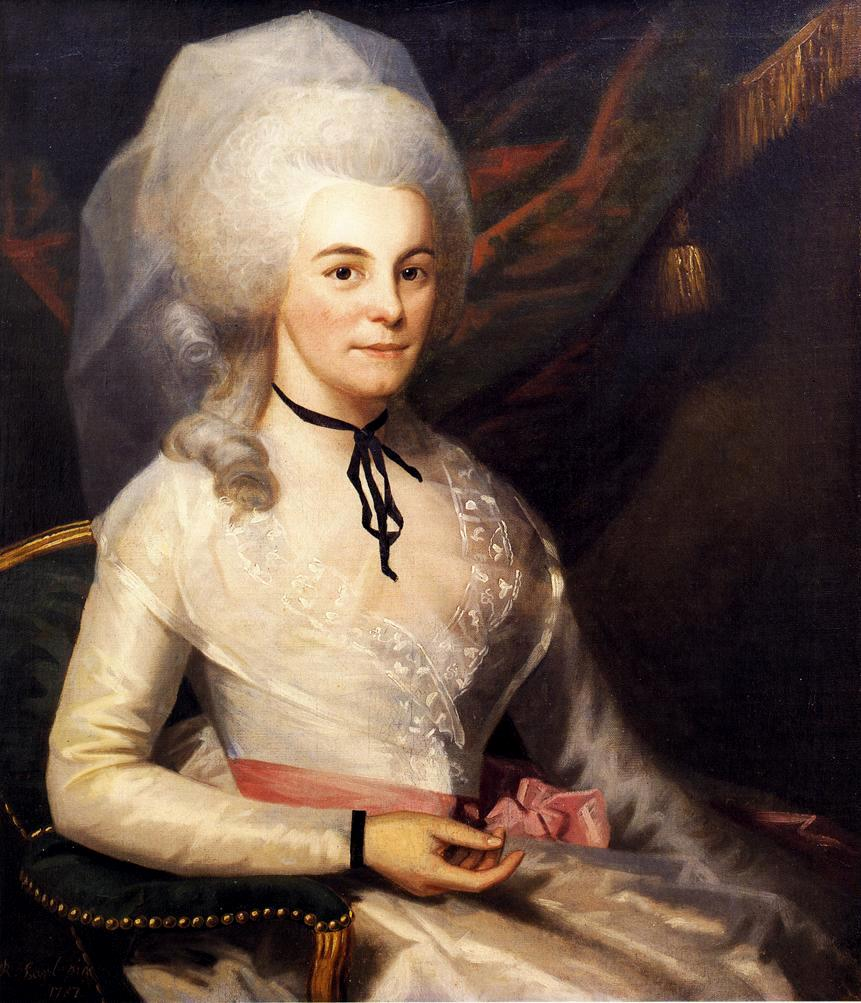
Portrait of Elizabeth Schuyler Hamilton (c. 1787)

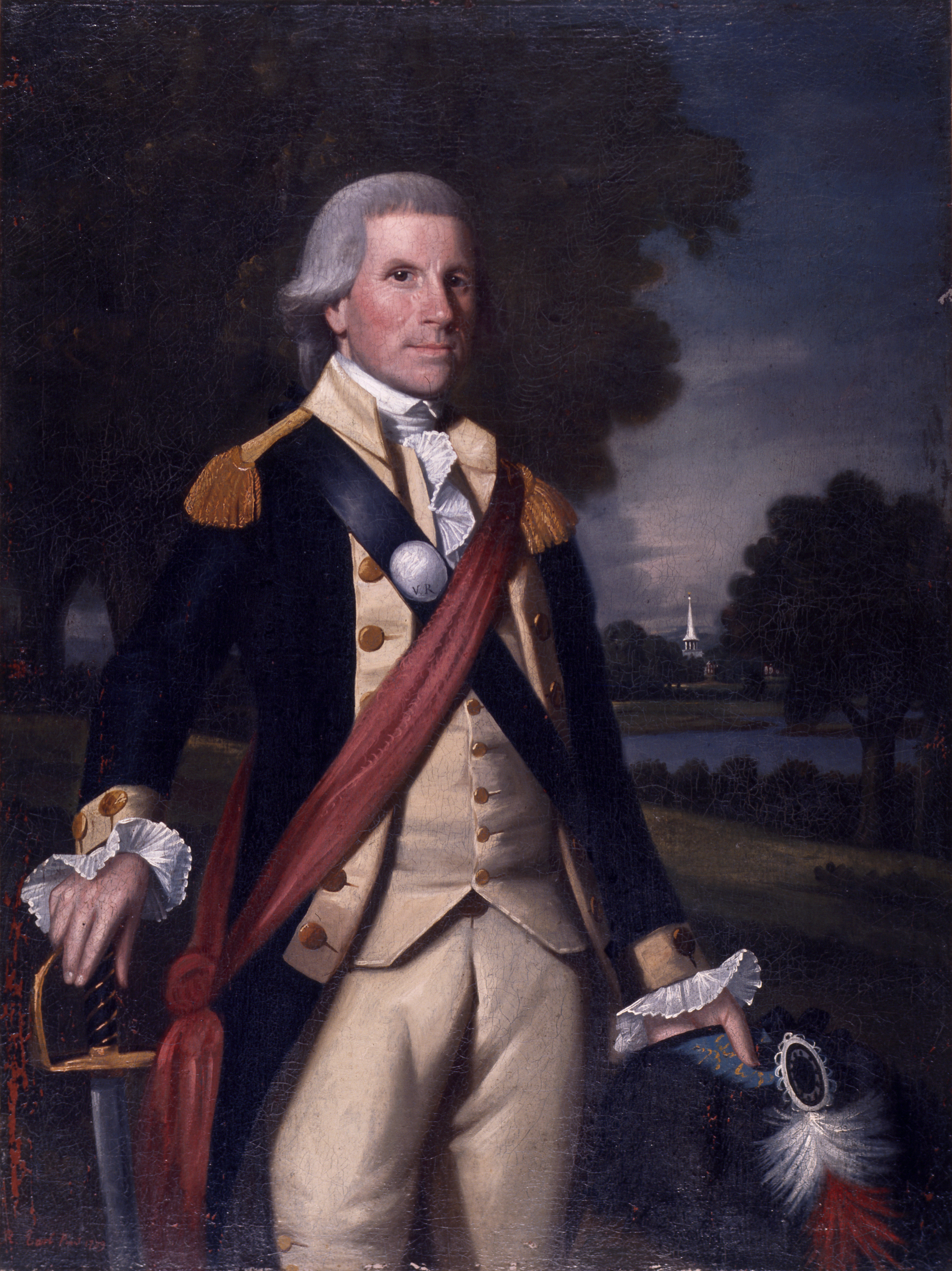
Major Moses Seymour

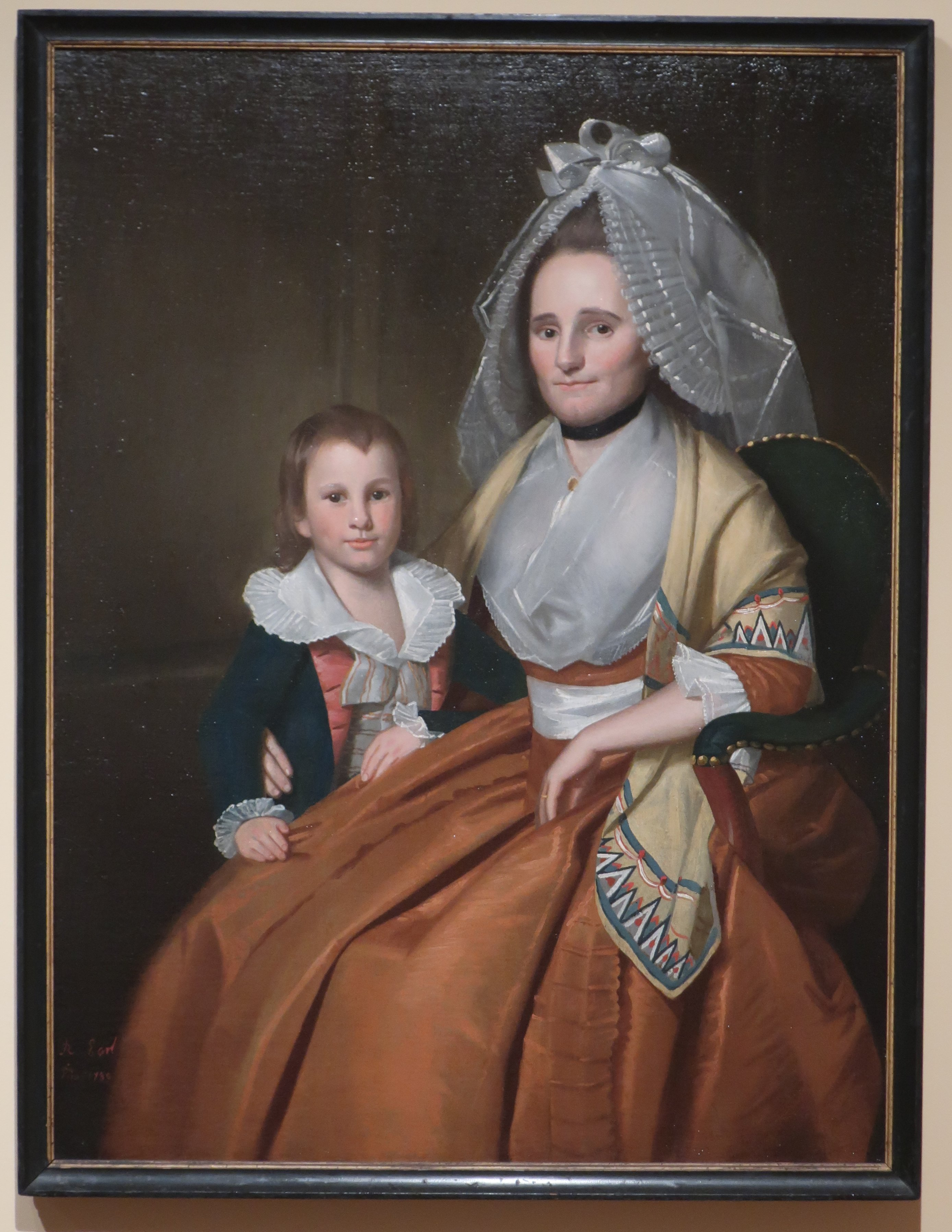
Mrs. Moses Seymour and Son, Epaphroditus

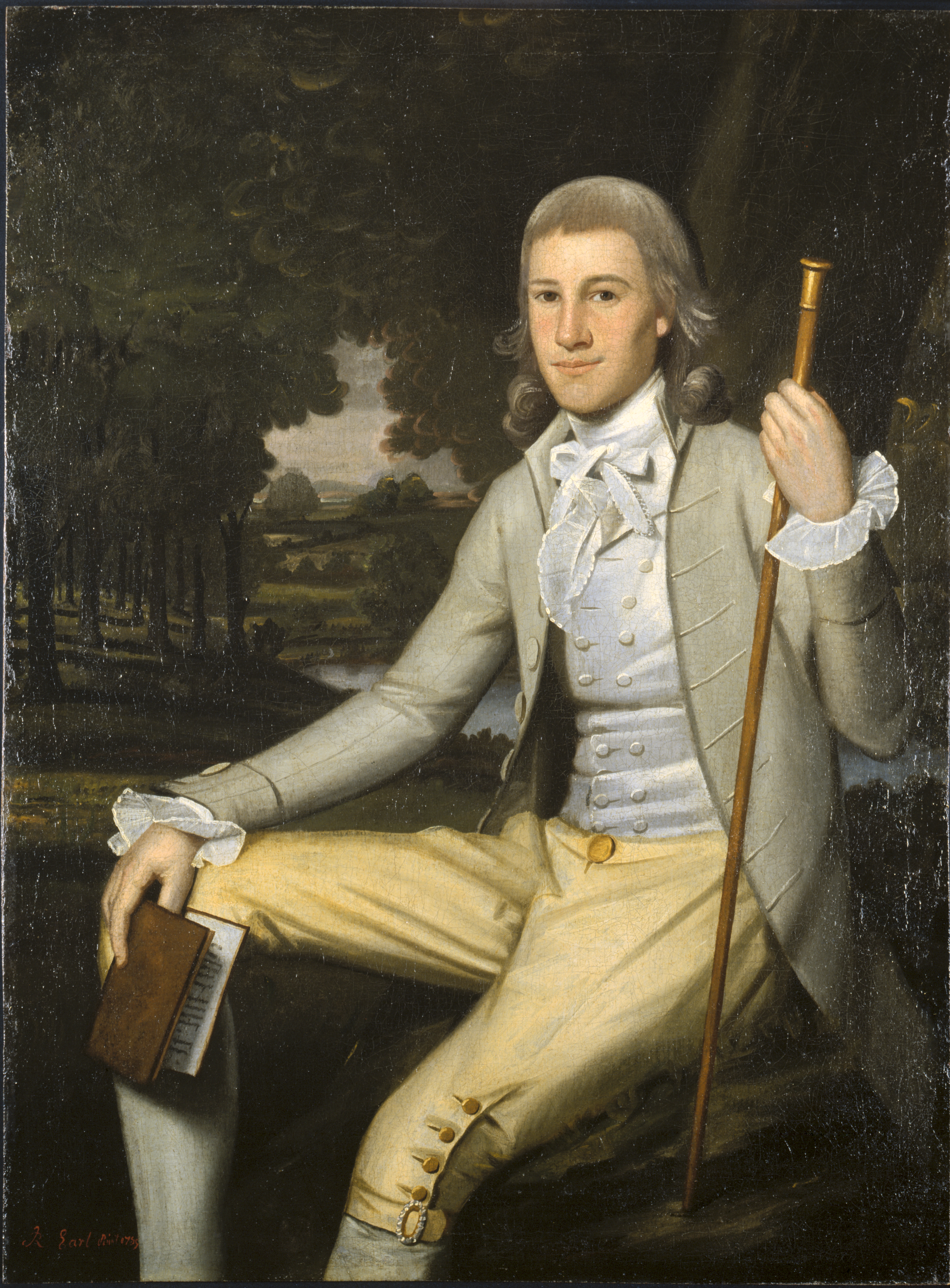
Moses Seymour, Jr. (1789), Cleveland Museum of Art

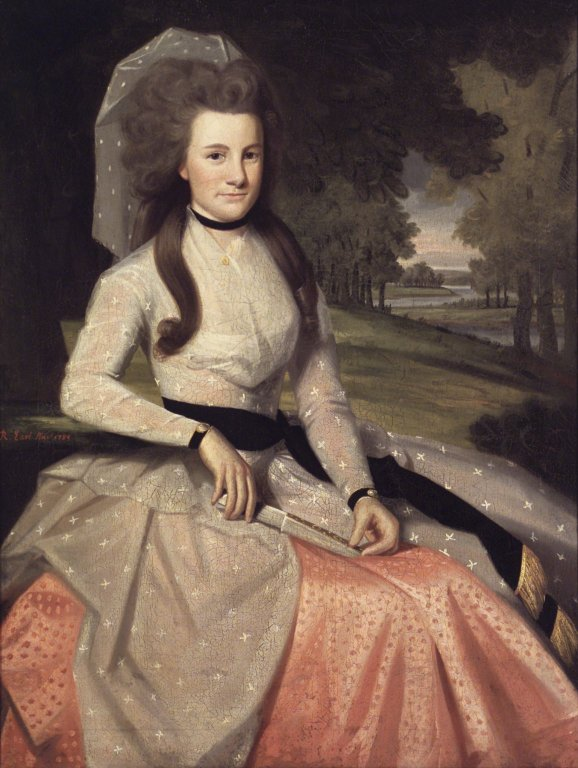
Portrait of Clarissa Seymour (later Mrs. Truman Marsh) (1789), Brooklyn Museum

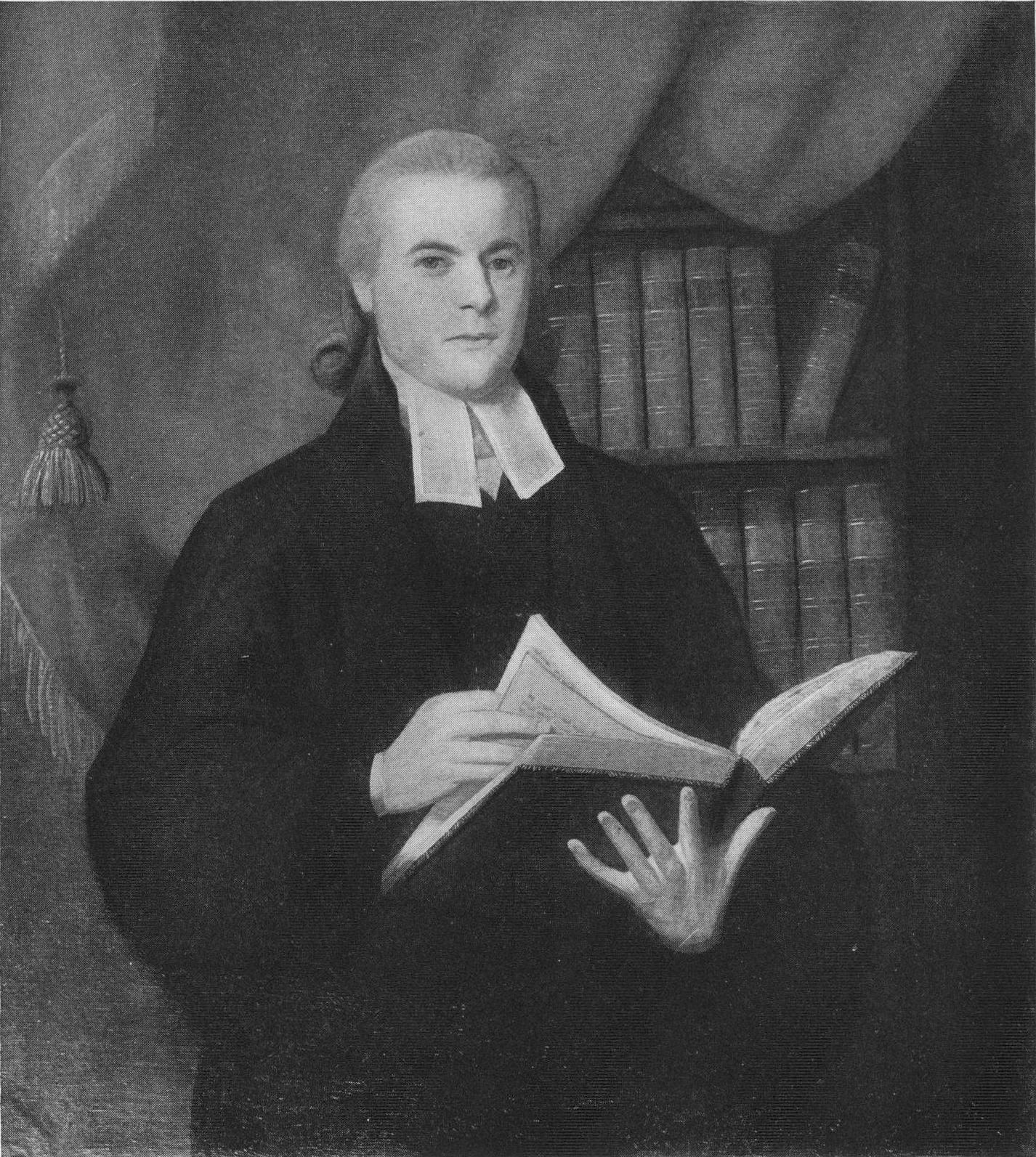
"Rev Truman Marsh"

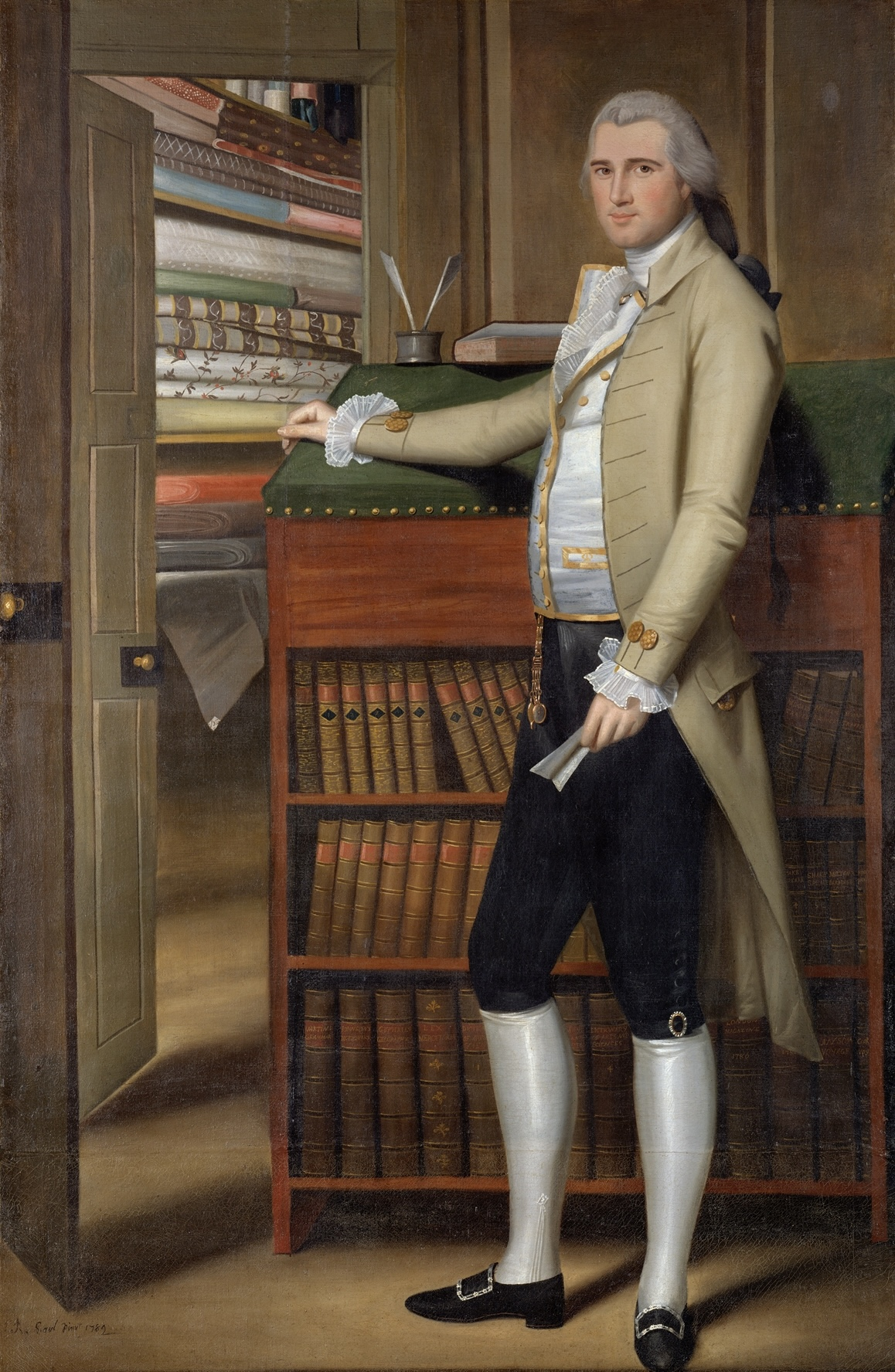
Portrait of Elijah Boardman (1789)

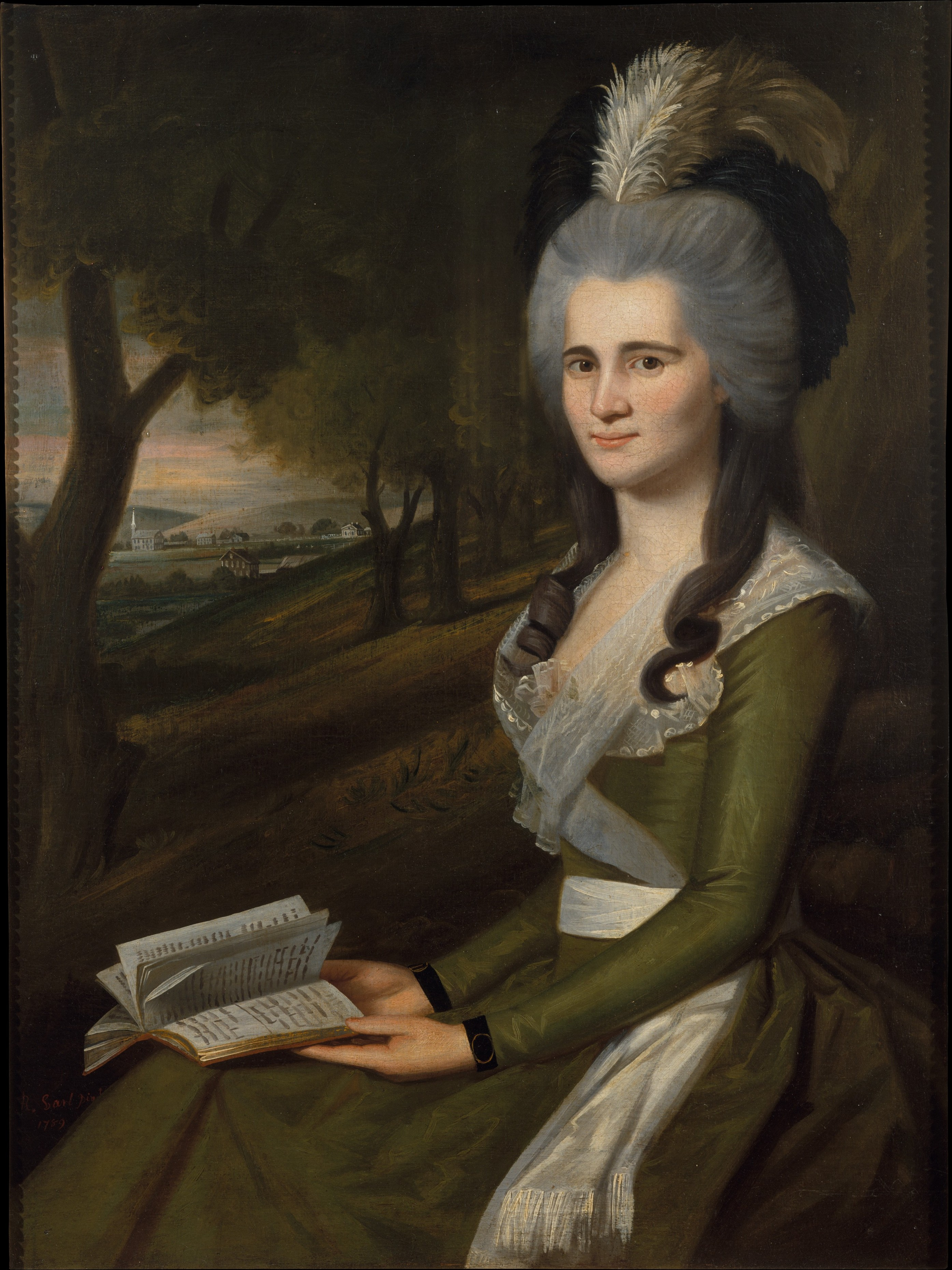
Portrait of Esther Boardman (1789), Metropolitan Museum of Art

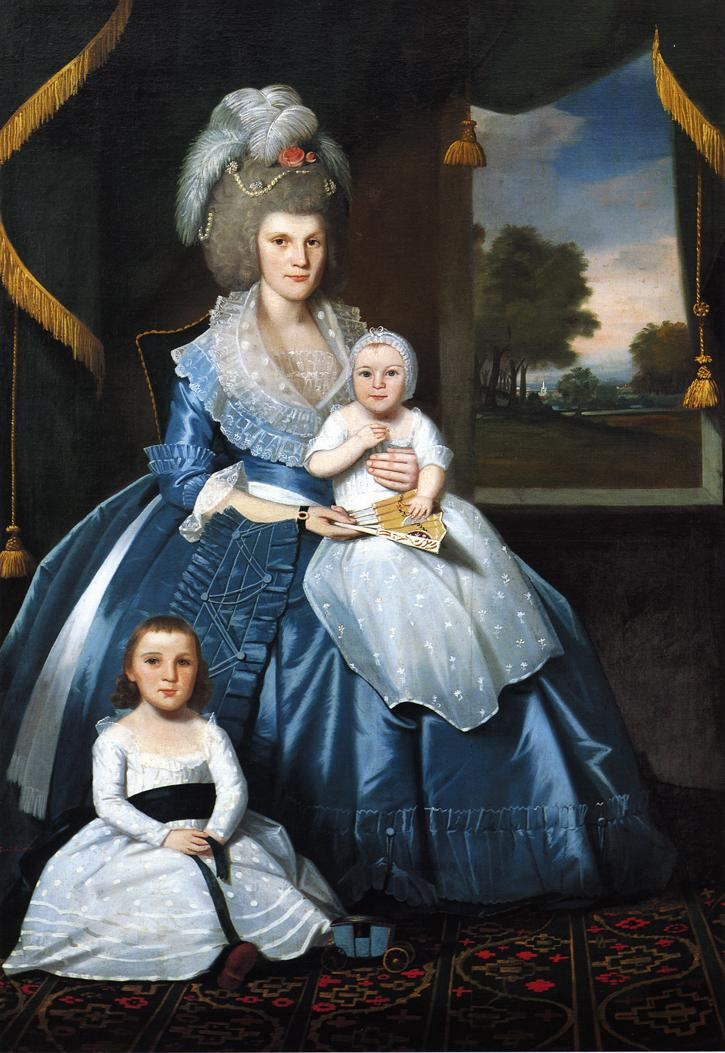
Portrait of Mrs. Benjamin Tallmadge with son Henry Floyd and daughter Maria Jones (1790)

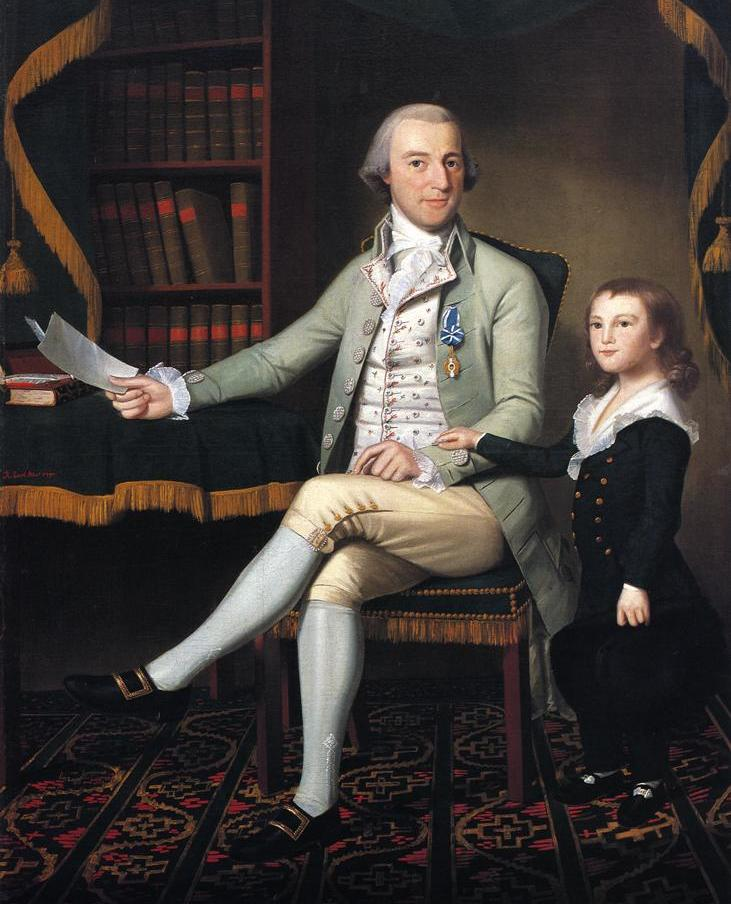
Portrait of Benjamin Tallmadge with son William (1790)

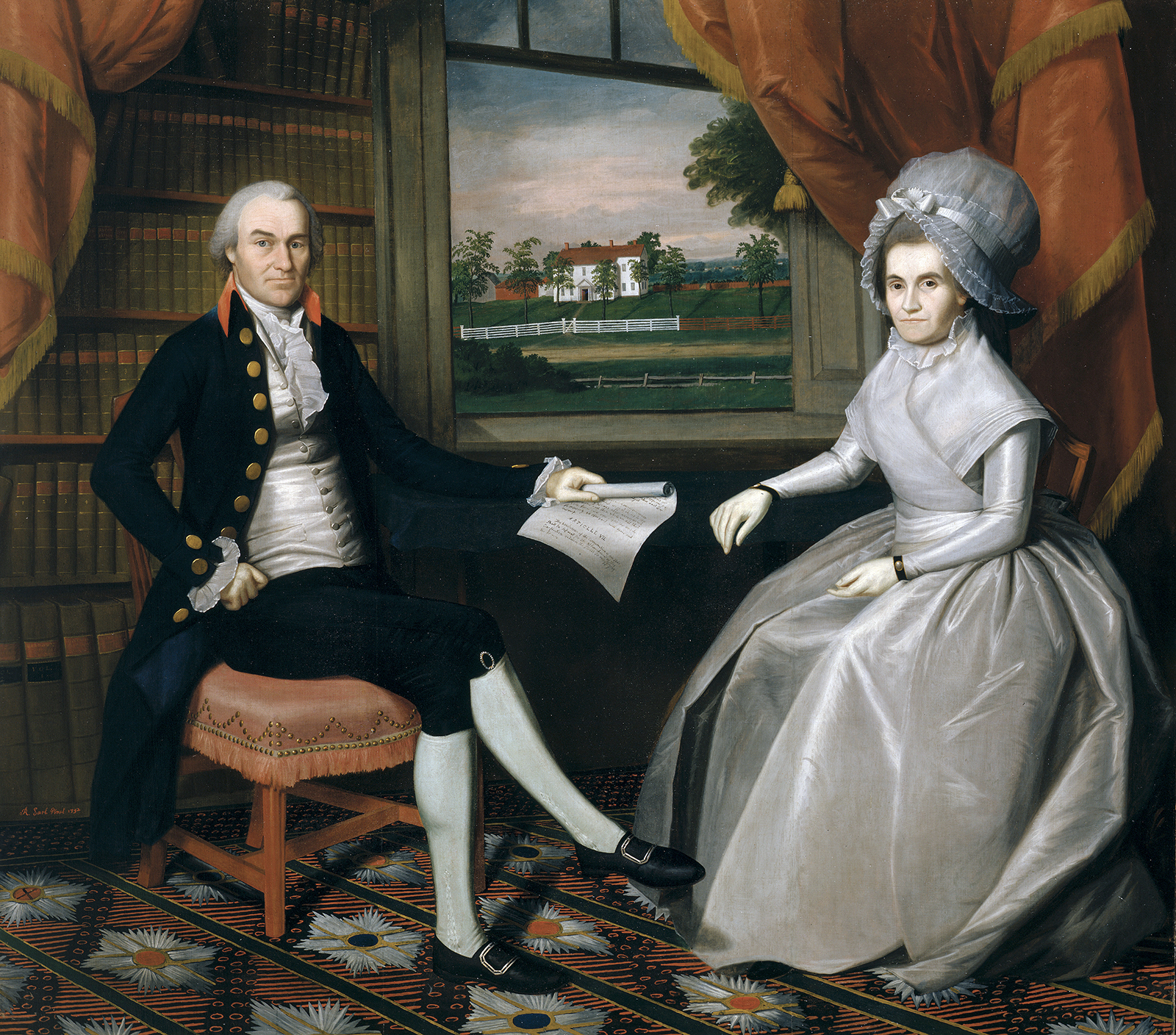
Portrait of Oliver and Abigail Ellsworth (1792), Wadsworth Atheneum, Hartford

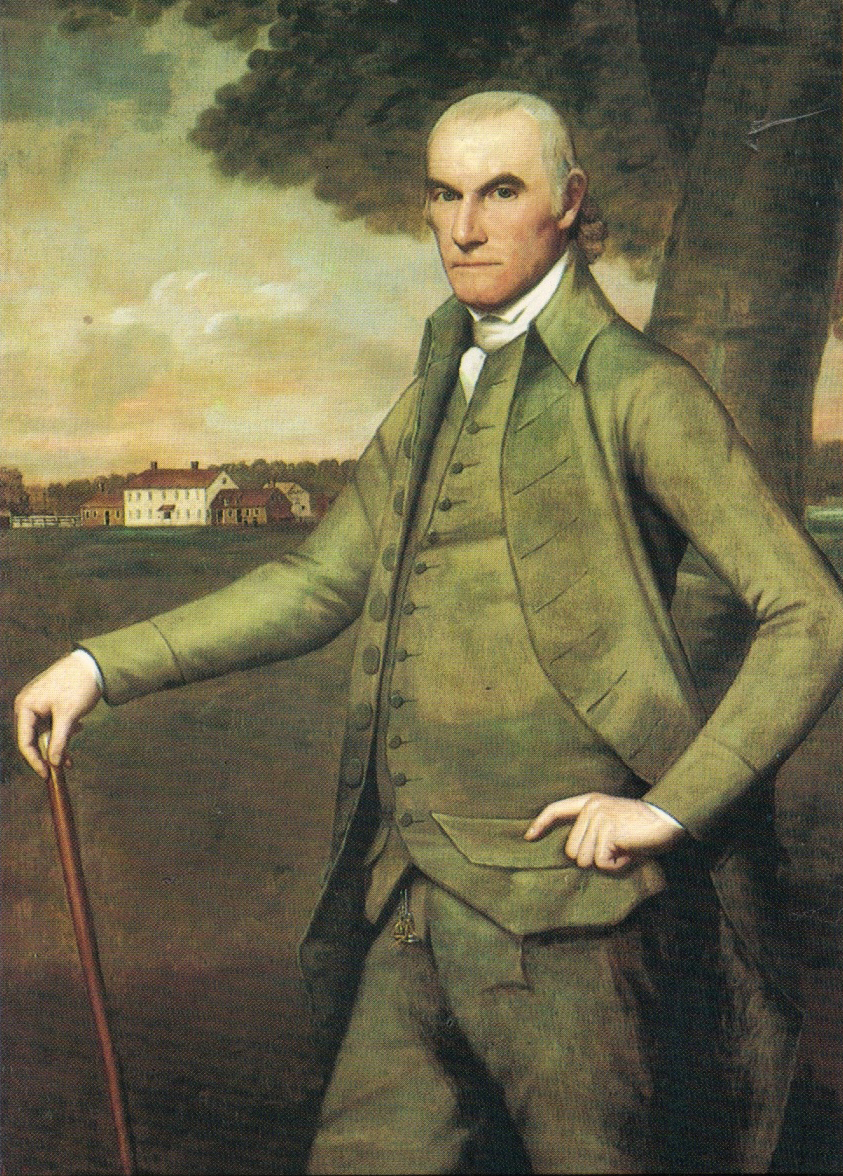
Congressman William Floyd
