= List of presidents of the United States who owned slaves =

Slavery was legal in the United States from its beginning as a nation, having been practiced in North America from early colonial days. The Thirteenth Amendment to the United States Constitution formally abolished chattel slavery in 1865, immediately after the end of the American Civil War.

Twelve U.S. presidents owned slaves at some point in their lives; of these, eight owned slaves while in office. Ten of the first twelve American presidents owned slaves, the only exceptions being John Adams and his son John Quincy Adams, neither of whom approved of slavery. George Washington, the first president, owned slaves, including while he was president. Andrew Jackson was an interregional slave trader until at least the War of 1812. Zachary Taylor was the last one who owned slaves during his presidency, and Ulysses S. Grant was the last president to have owned a slave at some point in his life. Of these presidents who owned slaves, George Washington owned the most over his lifetime, with 600+ slaves, followed closely by Thomas Jefferson. Woodrow Wilson was the last president born into a household with slave labor, though the Civil War and abolition concluded during his early childhood.

The White House Historical Association has created an index of slaves who built and worked at the President's mansion.

== Presidents who owned slaves ==
No.	President	Approximate number of slaves held	While in office?	Notes
1st	George Washington (details)	600–1000+	Yes (1789–1797)	Washington was a major slaveholder before, during, and after his presidency. His will freed his slaves pending the death of his widow, though she freed them within a year of her husband's death. As president, Washington signed a 1789 renewal of the 1787 Northwest Ordinance, which banned slavery north of the Ohio River. This was the first major restriction on the domestic expansion of slavery by the federal government in US history. In 1793 he signed into law the first Fugitive Slave Act, guaranteeing a right for a slave master to recover an escaped slave.
3rd	Thomas Jefferson (details)	200–600+	Yes (1801–1809)	Jefferson fathered multiple enslaved children with the enslaved woman Sally Hemings, the likely half-sister of his late wife Martha Wayles Skelton. Despite being a lifelong slave owner, Jefferson routinely condemned the institution of slavery, attempted to restrict its expansion, and advocated gradual emancipation. As president, he oversaw the abolition of the international slave trade.
4th	James Madison (details)	100+	Yes (1809–1817)	Madison occasionally condemned the institution of slavery and opposed the international slave trade, but he also vehemently opposed any attempts to restrict its domestic expansion. Madison did not free his slaves during his lifetime or in his will. Paul Jennings, one of Madison's slaves, served him during his presidency and later published the first memoir of life in the White House.
5th	James Monroe (details)	75	Yes (1817–1825)	Like Thomas Jefferson, Monroe condemned the institution of slavery as evil and advocated its gradual end, but still owned many slaves throughout his entire adult life, freeing only one of them in his final days. As president, he oversaw the Missouri Compromise, which admitted Missouri to the Union as a slave state in exchange for admitting Maine as a free state and banning slavery above the parallel 36°30′ north. Monroe supported sending freed slaves to the new country of Liberia; its capital, Monrovia, is named after him.
7th	Andrew Jackson (details)	200	Yes (1829–1837)	One controversy during his presidency was his reaction to anti-slavery tracts. During his campaign for the presidency, he faced criticism for being a slave trader. Jackson did not free his approximately 150 slaves in his will. When Jackson died he was in the top one percent of slave owners in the U.S. Unlike most of the other slave-owning presidents, he did not inherit any of his slaves, but rather built a fortune in human chattel from scratch.
8th	Martin Van Buren (details)	1	No (1837–1841)	Van Buren's father owned six slaves. The only slave Van Buren personally owned, Tom, escaped in 1814, and Van Buren made no effort to find him. In December 1824, A. G. Hammond of Berlin, New York, located Tom in Worcester, Massachusetts. Van Buren tentatively agreed to sell him to Hammond for $50, provided Hammond could capture him without violence. Hammond could not make the guarantee, and was disinclined to pay because New York's gradual emancipation law guaranteed that if he was re-enslaved, Tom would be freed in 1827. Tom remained free, as Van Buren probably intended. (Note: If Van Buren re-enslaved Tom, he risked alienating northern political supporters who opposed slavery. If he publicly refused to return Tom to slavery, he risked alienating pro-slavery supporters in the southern states. By taking no action, Van Buren eliminated the possibility of losing supporters from either side.) Later in life, Van Buren belonged to the Free Soil Party, which opposed the expansion of slavery into the Western territories.
9th	William Henry Harrison (details)	11	No (1841)	Harrison inherited several slaves. As the first governor of the Indiana Territory, he unsuccessfully lobbied Congress to legalize slavery in Indiana.
10th	John Tyler (details)	29	Yes (1841–1845)	Tyler never freed any of his slaves and consistently supported slaveholders' rights and the expansion of slavery during his time in political office.
11th	James K. Polk (details)	56	Yes (1845–1849)	Polk became the Democratic nominee for president in 1844 partially because of his tolerance of slavery, in contrast to Van Buren. As president, he generally supported the rights of slave owners. His will provided for the freeing of his slaves after the death of his wife, though the Emancipation Proclamation and the Thirteenth Amendment to the United States Constitution ended up freeing them long before her death in 1891.
12th	Zachary Taylor (details)	300	Yes (1849–50)	Although Taylor owned slaves throughout his life, he generally resisted attempts to expand slavery in the territories. Taylor opposed the Compromise of 1850, which admitted California into the Union as a free state and banned the slave trade in Washington, DC, in exchange for allowing most of the remaining territory captured from Mexico to decide the issue of slavery locally and passing a federal fugitive slave law requiring state authorities to assist federal marshals in capturing and detaining escaped slaves. However, Taylor died in office before he could veto the bill, leading to its successful passage under his successor Millard Fillmore. After his death, there were rumors that slavery advocates had poisoned him; tests of his body over 100 years later have been inconclusive. Taylor did not free any of his slaves in his will.
17th	Andrew Johnson (details)	9	No (1865–1869)	Johnson owned a few slaves and was supportive of James K. Polk's slavery policies. As military governor of Tennessee, he convinced Abraham Lincoln to exempt that area from the Emancipation Proclamation. Johnson went on to free all his personal slaves on August 8, 1863. On October 24, 1864, Johnson officially freed all slaves in Tennessee.
18th	Ulysses S. Grant (details)	1	No (1869–1877)	Although he later served as a general in the Union Army, his wife Julia had control of four slaves during the American Civil War, given to her by her father. It is unclear if she actually was granted legal ownership of them or merely temporary custody. All would be freed along with those freed by the Emancipation Proclamation of 1863, although by Julia's choice, as the proclamation did not apply to her state of Missouri. Grant was given a slave, William Jones, from his father-in-law. Even though he was not an abolitionist at this time, he did not like the idea of slavery, and could not bring himself to make Jones work as a slave, nor sell Jones. So, Grant's holding was brief and he freed William Jones on March 29, 1859.

== Gallery ==
American slavery and the presidents
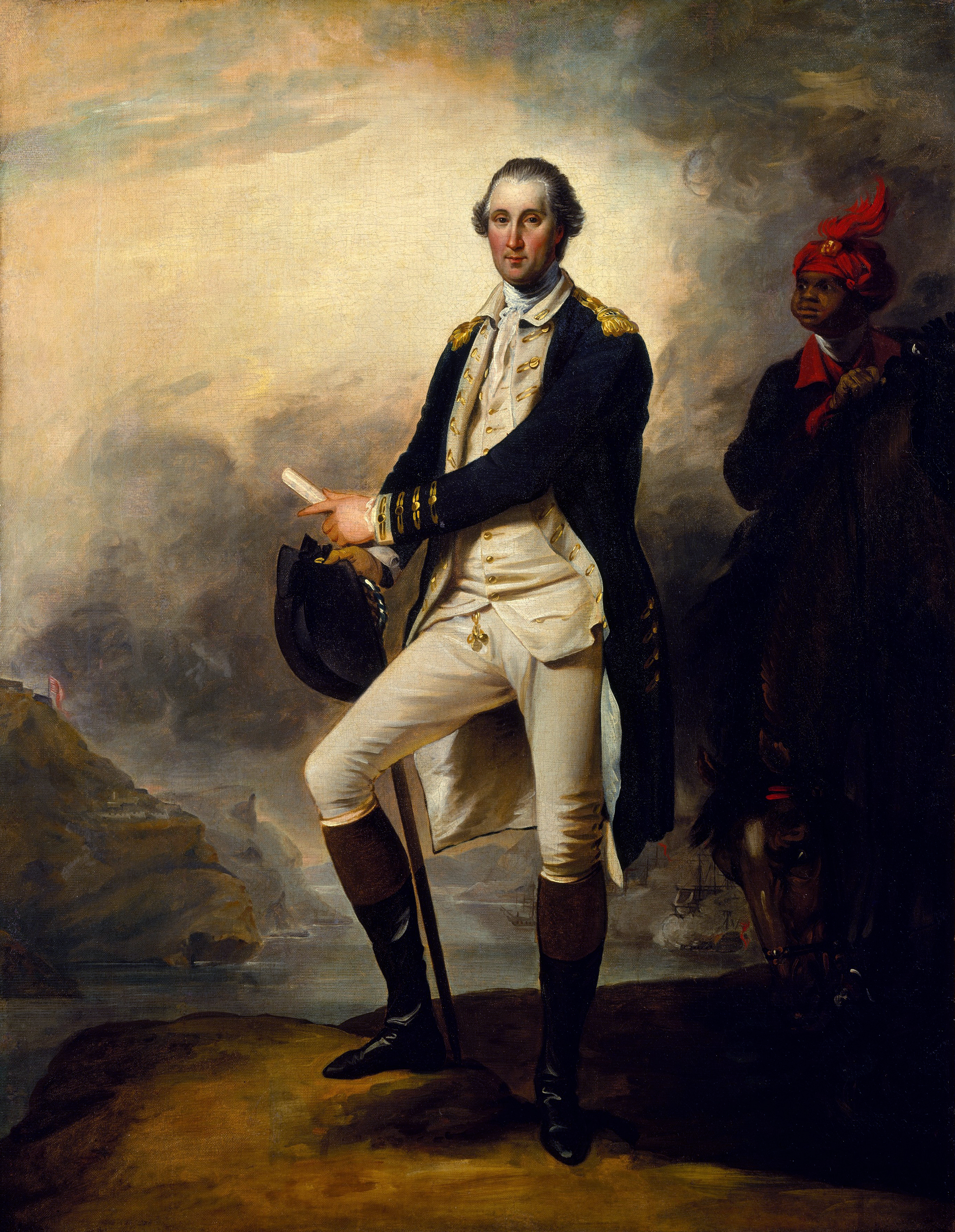
John Trumbull's 1780 portrait George Washington also depicts a man believed to be Washington's enslaved valet William Lee (Metropolitan Museum of Art 24.109.88)

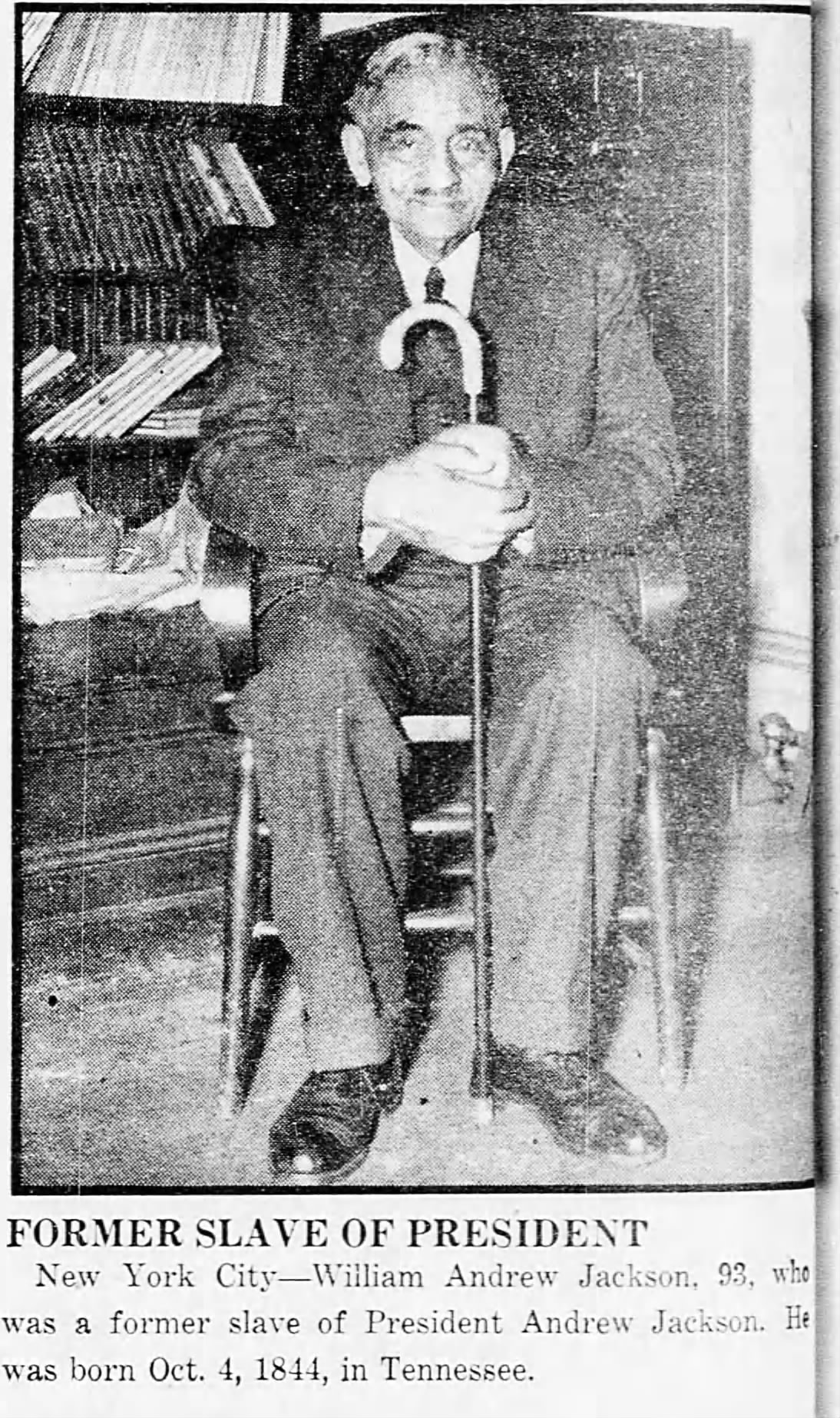
Miscaptioned c. 1937 photo of William Andrew Johnson, who had been enslaved by Andrew Johnson, and was believed to be the last surviving person enslaved by a U.S. president. Andrew Johnson bid $500 for William A. Johnson's mother Dolly Johnson

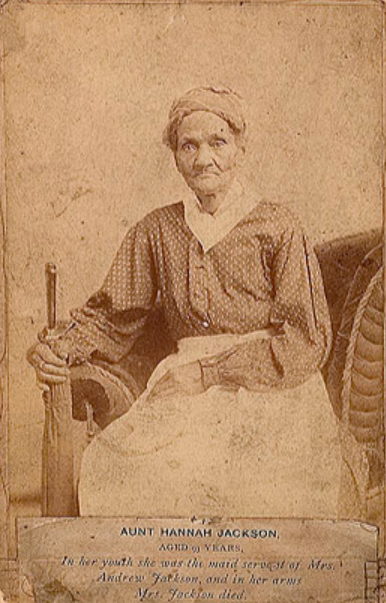
Hannah Jackson was enslaved by Andrew Jackson at The Hermitage in Middle Tennessee

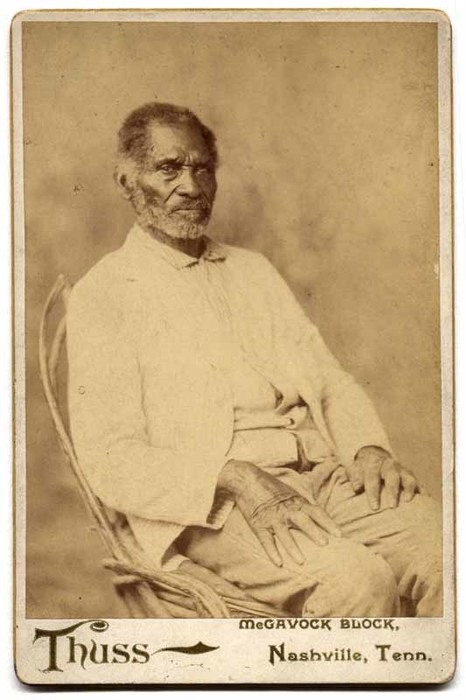
Alfred Jackson (1812–1901) lived at The Hermitage longer than any other person

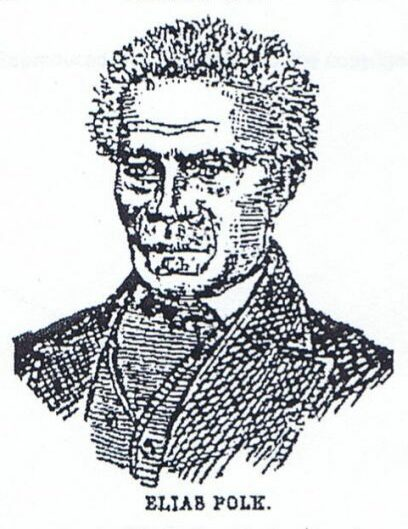
Elias Polk was enslaved by James K. Polk at his farm in Maury County, Tennessee

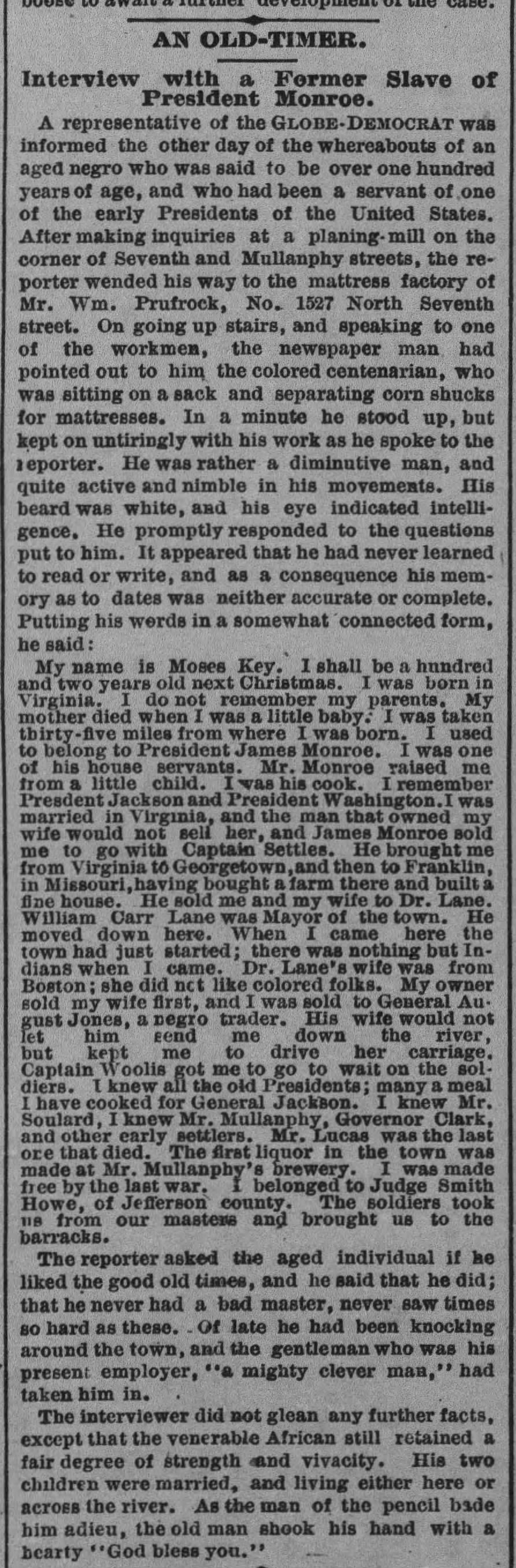
In 1875, the St. Louis Globe published this interview with Moses Key, a former slave of James Monroe

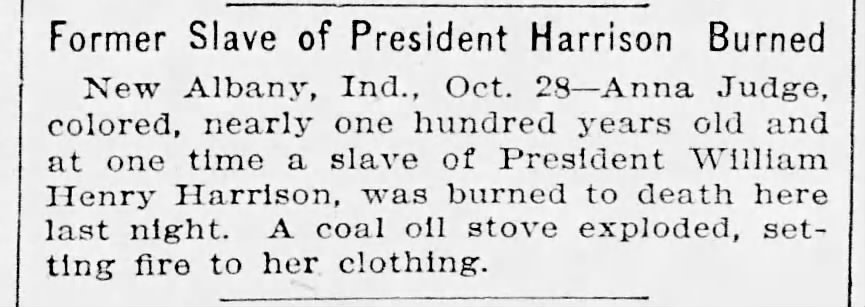
Anna Judge, "nearly a hundred years old" and formerly enslaved by William Henry Harrison, died in a kitchen-fire accident in 1899

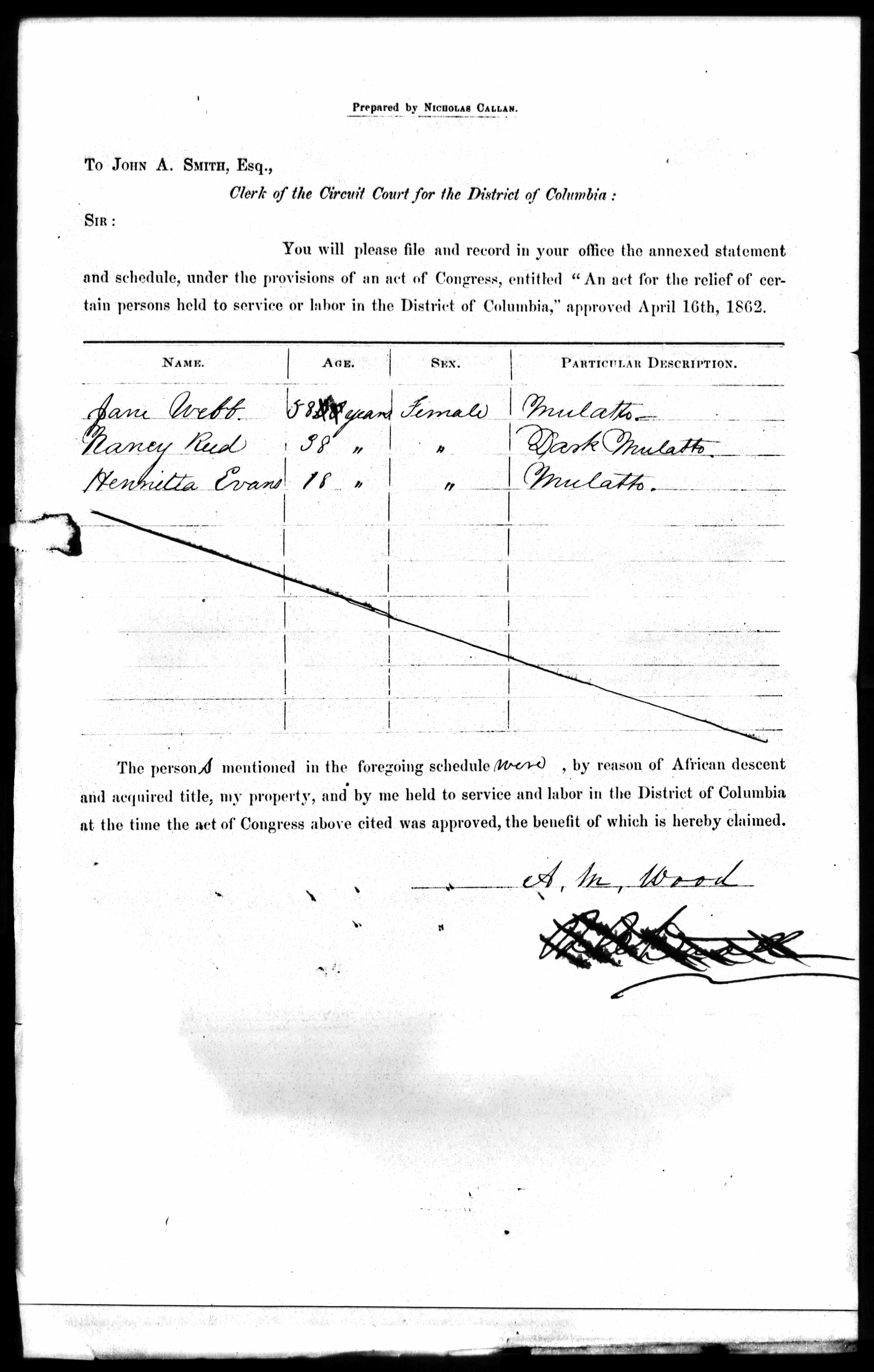
In 1862, Zachary Taylor's daughter requested financial compensation from the U.S. government for the value of Jane Webb, a formerly enslaved woman who had accompanied her father to the White House during his presidency

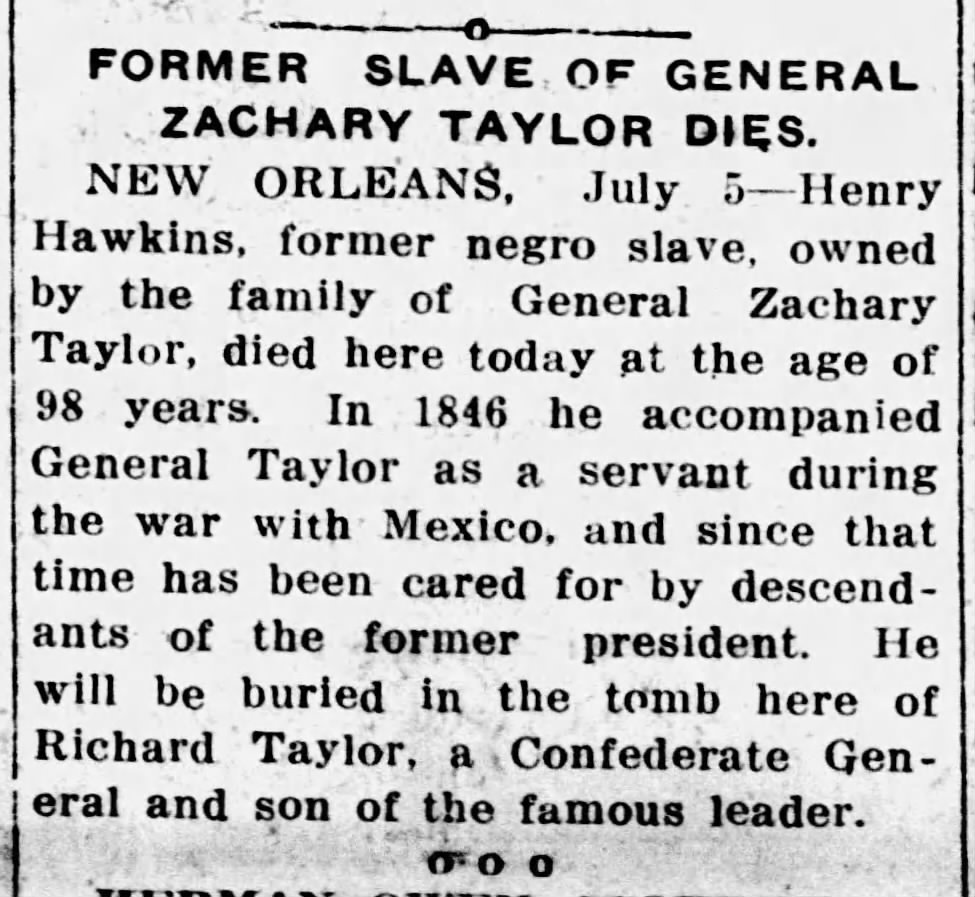
Henry Hawkins (1819–1917) accompanied Zachary Taylor on his Mexican-American War campaigns, and was to be interred at the mausoleum of Dick Taylor in Metairie Cemetery, New Orleans (Natchez Democrat, July 6, 1917)

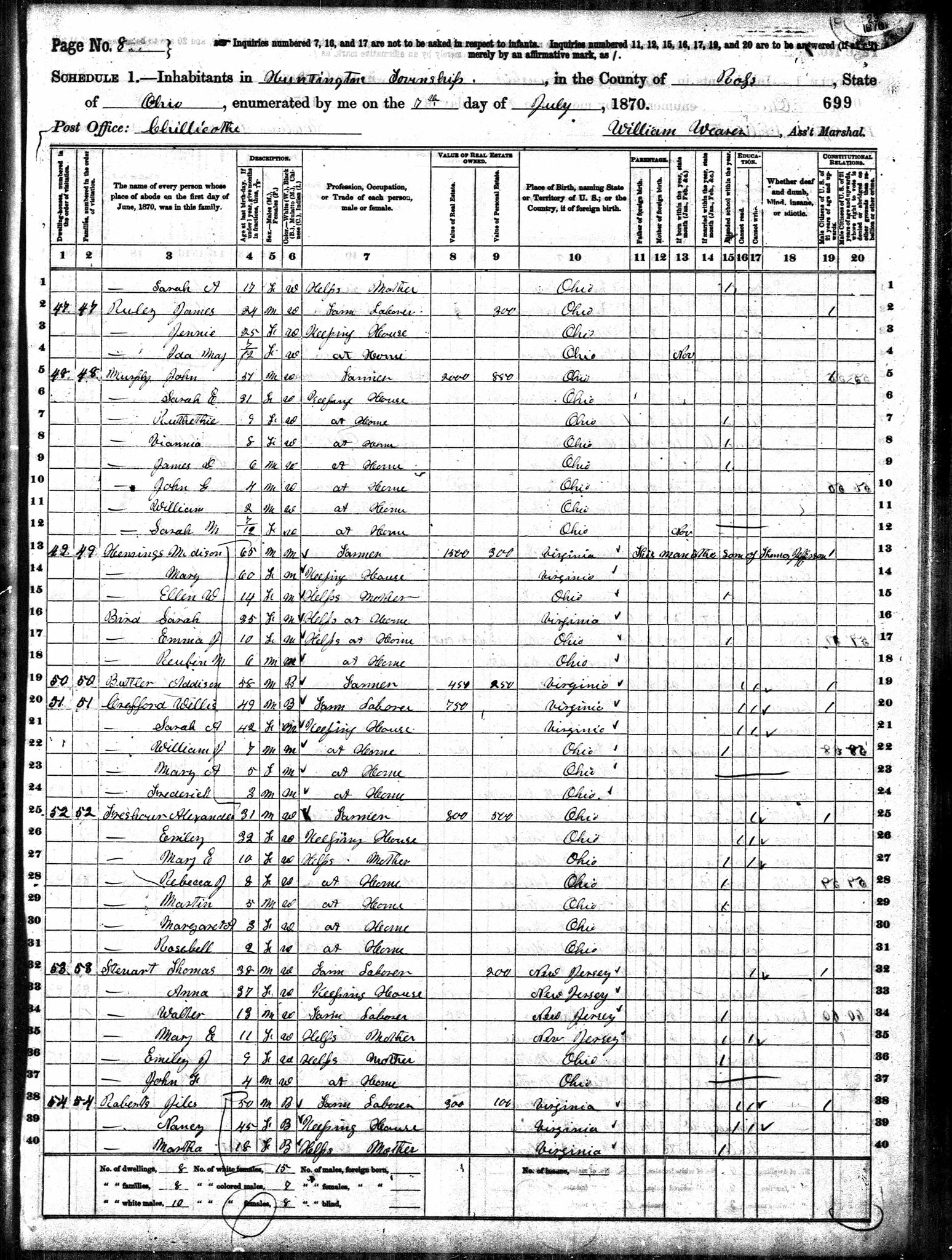
1870 federal census of Ross County, Ohio; the enumerator broke protocol to note of Madison Hemings, "This man is the son of Thomas Jefferson."

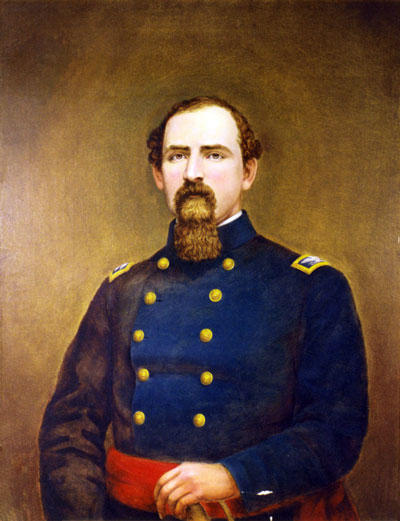
Madison's brother and fellow slave of Thomas Jefferson Eston Hemings moved to Wisconsin and changed his name to Jefferson; Eston's son John Wayles Jefferson (pictured) was a U.S. Army officer during the Civil War

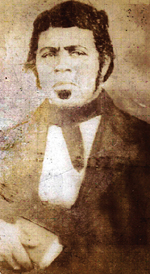
Paul Jennings wrote A Colored Man's Reminiscences of James Madison and helped plan what became known as the Pearl incident

Three U.S. Presidents, George Washington, Thomas Jefferson, and Andrew Jackson are known to have placed runaway slave ads, seeking to recapture fugitives "Sandy", Oney Judge, and in the case of Jackson, both "a mulatto Man Slave" in 1804, and Gilbert in 1822.

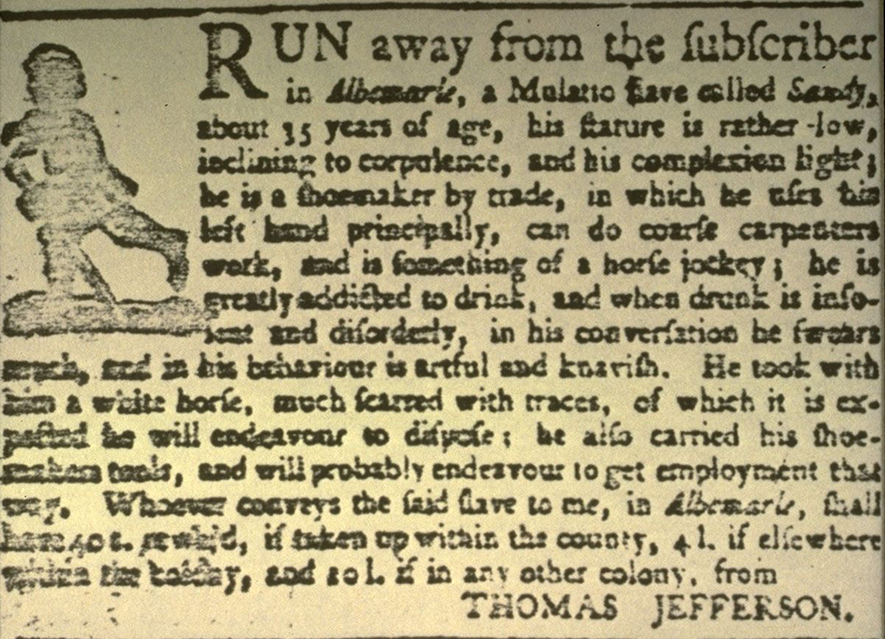
Thomas Jefferson and slavery: "Run away from the subscriber..." (Virginia Gazette, 1769)

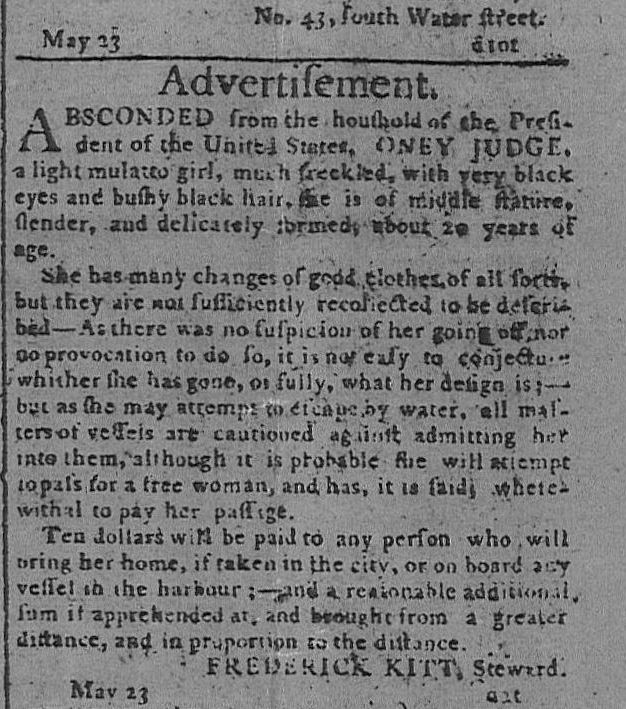
George Washington and slavery: Oney Judge "absconded from the household of the President of the United States..." (Pennsylvania Gazette, May 24, 1796)

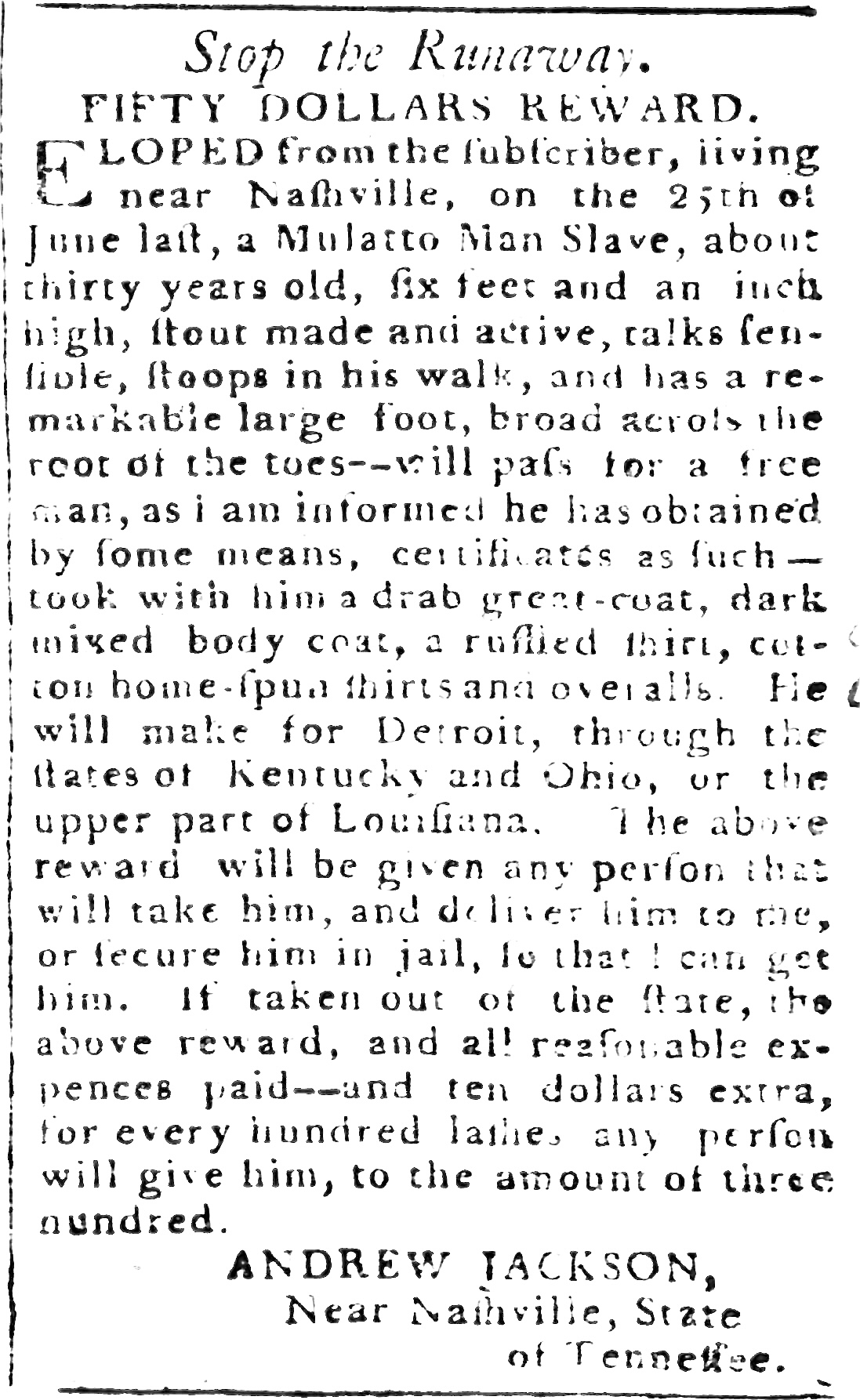
"Stop the Runaway. Fifty Dollars Reward." Andrew Jackson offered to pay extra for more violence (The Tennessee Gazette, October 3, 1804)

== See also ==
- Historical rankings of presidents of the United States § Scholar surveys of diversity and racism
- List of children of presidents of the United States
- Abolitionism in the United States
- District of Columbia Compensated Emancipation Act (1862), which ended slavery in Washington, D.C.
- John Quincy Adams and abolitionism
- Lists of United States public officials who owned slaves
- Slavery in the District of Columbia
- Treatment of slaves in the United States
- Polk Taylor, reportedly owned by Zachary Taylor's daughter
- Eva Bates, reportedly employed by both John Adams and James Monroe
