= Kansas–Nebraska Act =

American law establishing two territories

- Long title: An Act to Organize the Territories of Nebraska and Kansas
- Enacted by: the 33rd United States Congress
- Effective: May 30, 1854

Codification
- Acts repealed: Missouri Compromise

Legislative history
- Introduced in the Senate by Stephen A. Douglas (D–IL); Passed the Senate on March 3, 1854 (37–14); Passed the House on May 22, 1854 (113–100); Signed into law by President Franklin Pierce on May 30, 1854

The Kansas–Nebraska Act of 1854 (10 Stat. 277) was a territorial organic act that created the territories of Kansas and Nebraska. It was drafted by Democratic senator Stephen A. Douglas, passed by the 33rd United States Congress, and signed into law by President Franklin Pierce. Douglas introduced the bill with the intention of opening up new lands to develop and facilitate the construction of a transcontinental railroad. However, the Kansas–Nebraska Act effectively repealed the Missouri Compromise of 1820, stoking national tensions over slavery and contributing to a series of armed conflicts known as "Bleeding Kansas".

The United States had acquired vast amounts of land in the 1803 Louisiana Purchase; and since the 1840s, Douglas had sought to establish a territorial government in a portion of the Louisiana Purchase that was still unorganized. Douglas's efforts were stymied by Senator David Rice Atchison of Missouri and other Southern leaders who refused to allow the creation of territories that banned slavery; slavery would have been banned because the Missouri Compromise outlawed slavery in the territory north of latitude 36° 30′ north (except for Missouri). Pierce and Douglas, in order to win the support of Southerners like Atchison, agreed to back the repeal of the Missouri Compromise, with the status of slavery to be determined instead by "popular sovereignty". Under popular sovereignty, the citizens of each territory, rather than Congress, would determine whether slavery would be allowed.

Douglas's bill to repeal the Missouri Compromise and organize Kansas Territory and Nebraska Territory won approval by a wide margin in the Senate, but faced stronger opposition in the House of Representatives. Though Northern Whigs strongly opposed the bill, it passed the House with the support of almost all Southerners and some Northern Democrats. After the passage of the Act, pro- and anti-slavery elements flooded into Kansas to establish a population that would vote for or against slavery, resulting in a series of armed conflicts known as "Bleeding Kansas". Douglas and Pierce hoped that popular sovereignty would help bring an end to the national debate over slavery, but the Kansas–Nebraska Act outraged Northerners. The division between pro-slavery and anti-slavery forces caused by the Act was the death knell for the ailing Whig Party, which broke apart after the Act. Its Northern remnants would give rise to the anti-slavery Republican Party. The Act, and the tensions that it inflamed over slavery, were key events leading to the American Civil War.

== Background ==
In his 1853 inaugural address, President Franklin Pierce expressed hope that the Compromise of 1850 had settled the debate over the issue of slavery in the territories. For the Utah Territory and New Mexico Territory, lands acquired in the Mexican–American War, the Compromise left the issue of slavery to be decided by popular sovereignty. The Missouri Compromise, which banned slavery in territories north of the 36°30′ parallel, remained in place for the other U.S. territories acquired in the Louisiana Purchase, including a vast unorganized territory often referred to as "Nebraska". As settlers poured into the unorganized territory, and commercial and political interests called for a transcontinental railroad through the region, pressure mounted for the organization of the eastern parts of the unorganized territory. Though the organization of the territory was required to develop the region, an organization bill threatened to re-open the contentious debates over slavery in the territories that had taken place during and after the Mexican–American War.

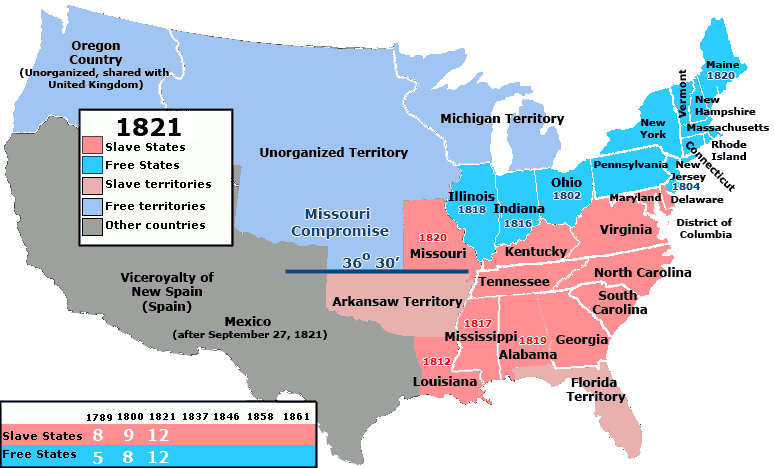
Missouri Compromise line (36°30′ parallel) in dark blue, 1821. Territory above this line would be reserved for free states, and below, slave states.

The topic of a transcontinental railroad had been discussed since the 1840s. While there were debates over the specifics, especially the route to be taken, there was a public consensus that such a railroad should be built by private interests, and financed by public land grants. In 1845, Stephen A. Douglas, then serving in his first term in the U.S. House of Representatives, had submitted an unsuccessful plan to organize the Nebraska Territory formally, as the first step in building a railroad with its eastern terminus in Chicago. Railroad proposals were debated in all subsequent sessions of Congress with cities such as Chicago, St. Louis, Quincy, Memphis, and New Orleans competing to be the jumping-off point for the construction.

Several proposals in late 1852 and early 1853 had strong support, but they failed because of disputes over whether the railroad would follow a northern or a southern route. In early 1853, the House of Representatives passed a bill 107 to 49 to organize the Nebraska Territory in the land west of Iowa and Missouri. In March, the bill moved to the Senate Committee on Territories, which was headed by Douglas. Missouri Senator David Atchison announced that he would support the Nebraska proposal only if slavery were to be permitted. While the bill was silent on this issue, slavery would have been prohibited under the Missouri Compromise in the territory north of 36°30' latitude and west of the Mississippi River. Other Southern senators were as inflexible as Atchison. By a vote of 23 to 17, the Senate voted to table the motion, with every senator from the states south of Missouri voting to the table.

During the Senate adjournment, the issues of the railroad and the repeal of the Missouri Compromise became entangled in Missouri politics, as Atchison campaigned for re-election against the forces of Thomas Hart Benton. Atchison was maneuvered into choosing between antagonizing the state's railroad interests or its slaveholders. Finally, he took the position that he would rather see Nebraska "sink in hell" before he would allow it to be overrun by free soilers.

Representatives then generally found lodging in boarding houses when they were in the nation's capital to perform their legislative duties. Atchison shared lodgings in an F Street house shared by the leading Southerners in Congress. He was the Senate's President pro tempore. His housemates included Robert T. Hunter (from Virginia, chairman of the Finance Committee), James Mason (from Virginia, chairman of the Foreign Affairs Committee) and Andrew P. Butler (from South Carolina, chairman of the Judiciary Committee). When Congress reconvened on December 5, 1853, the group, termed the F Street Mess, along with Virginian William O. Goode, formed the nucleus that would insist on slaveholder equality in Nebraska. Douglas was aware of the group's opinions and power and knew that he needed to address its concerns. Douglas was also a fervent believer in popular sovereignty—the policy of letting the voters, almost exclusively white males, of a territory decide whether or not slavery should exist in it.

Iowa Senator Augustus C. Dodge immediately reintroduced the same legislation to organize Nebraska that had stalled in the previous session; it was referred to Douglas's committee on December 14. Douglas, hoping to achieve the support of the Southerners, publicly announced that the same principle that had been established in the Compromise of 1850 should apply in Nebraska.

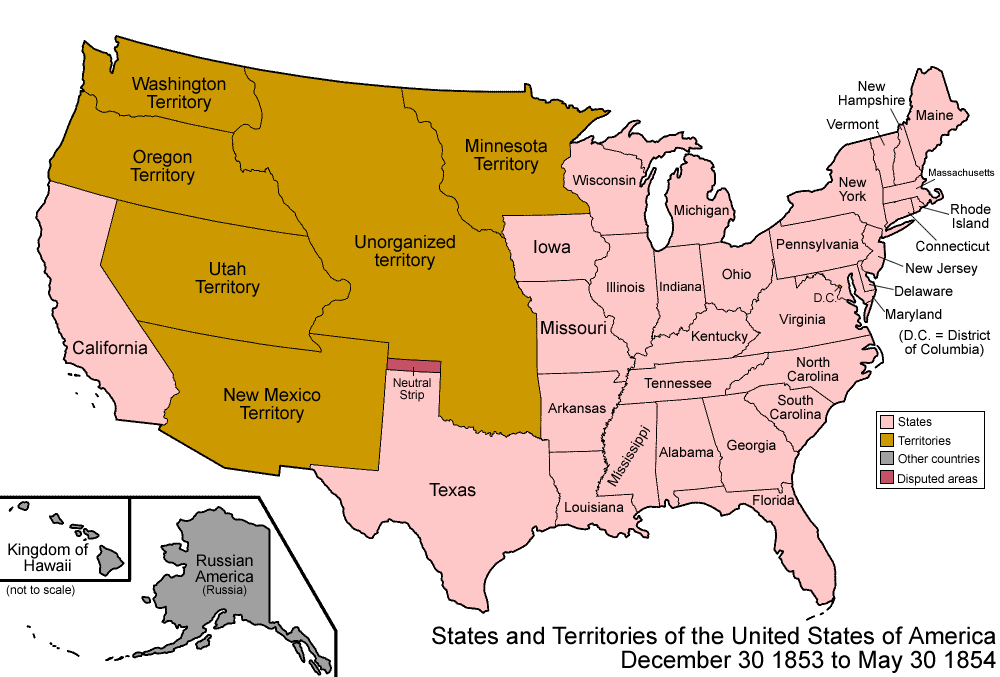
The United States after the Compromise of 1850 and the Gadsden Purchase. Douglas sought to organize parts of the area labeled as "Unorganized territory".

In the Compromise of 1850, Utah and New Mexico Territories had been organized without any restrictions on slavery, and many supporters of Douglas argued that the compromise had already superseded the Missouri Compromise. The territories were, however, given the authority to decide for themselves whether they would apply for statehood as either free or slaves states whenever they chose to apply. The two territories, however, unlike Nebraska, had not been part of the Louisiana Purchase and had arguably never been subject to the Missouri Compromise.

== Congressional action ==
=== Introduction of Nebraska bill ===
The bill was reported to the main body of the Senate on January 4, 1854. It had been modified by Douglas, who had also authored the New Mexico Territory and Utah Territory Acts, to mirror the language from the Compromise of 1850. In the bill, a vast new Nebraska Territory was created to extend from Kansas north to the 49th parallel, the US–Canada border. A large portion of Nebraska Territory would soon be split off into Dakota Territory (1861), and smaller portions transferred to Colorado Territory (1861) and Idaho Territory (1863) before the balance of the land became the State of Nebraska in 1867.

Furthermore, any decisions on slavery in the new lands were to be made "when admitted as a state or states, the said territory, or any portion of the same, shall be received into the Union, with or without slavery, as their constitution may prescribe at the time of their admission." In a report accompanying the bill, Douglas's committee wrote that the Utah and New Mexico Acts:

... were intended to have a far more comprehensive and enduring effect than the mere adjustment of the difficulties arising out of the recent acquisition of Mexican territory. They were designed to establish certain great principles, which would not only furnish adequate remedies for existing evils, but, in all times to come, avoid the perils of a similar agitation, by withdrawing the question of slavery from the halls of Congress and the political arena, and committing it to the arbitrament of those who were immediately interested in, and alone responsible for its consequences.

The report compared the situation in New Mexico and Utah with the situation in Nebraska. In the first instance, many had argued that slavery had previously been prohibited under Mexican law, just as it was prohibited in Nebraska under the 1820 Missouri Compromise. Just as the creation of New Mexico and Utah territories had not ruled on the validity of Mexican law on the acquired territory, the Nebraska bill was neither "affirming nor repealing ... the Missouri act". In other words, popular sovereignty was being established by ignoring, rather than addressing, the problem presented by the Missouri Compromise.

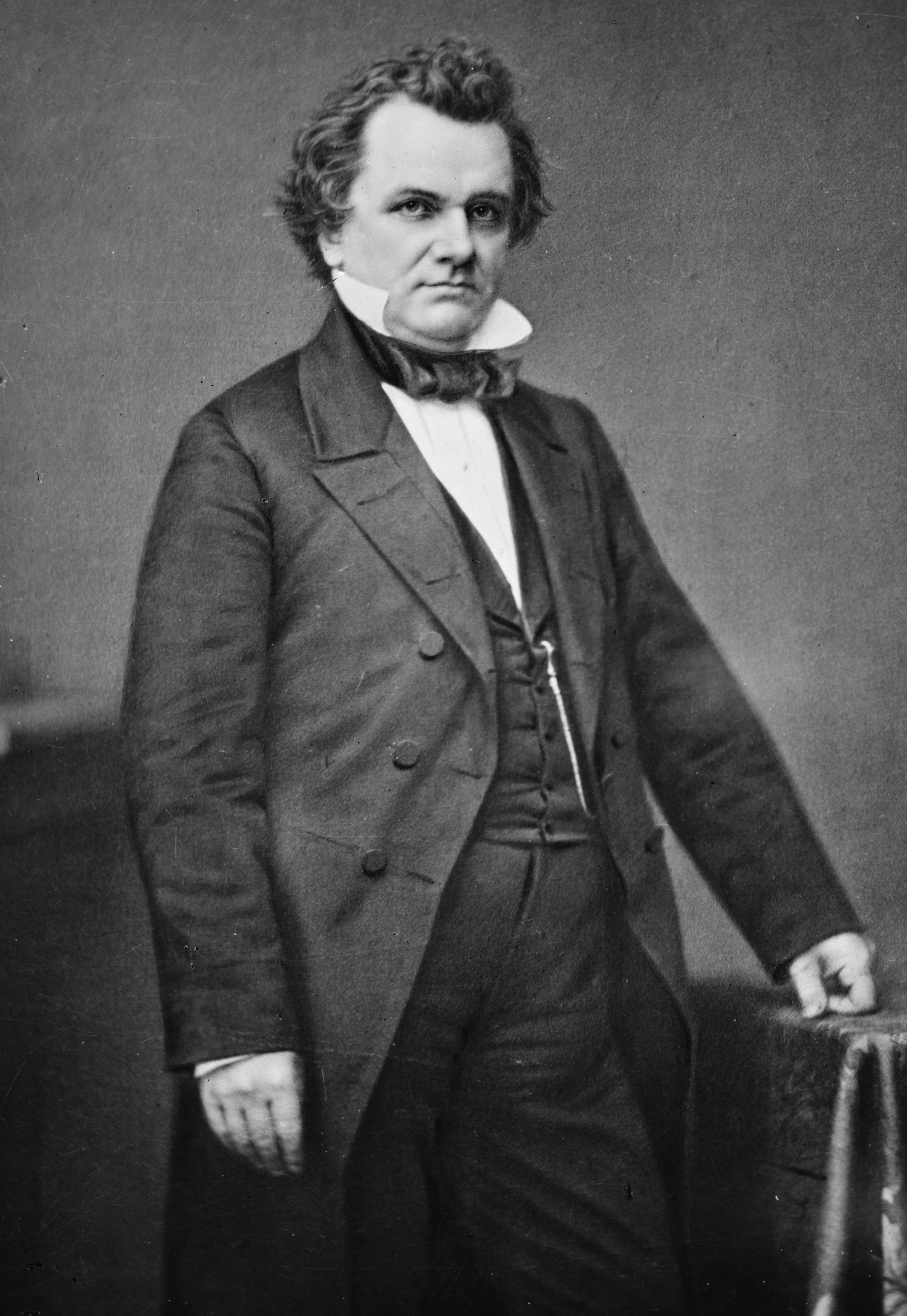
Stephen A. Douglas from Illinois argued – "The great principle of self-government is at stake, and surely the people of this country are never going to decide that the principle upon which our whole republican system rests is vicious and wrong."

Douglas's attempt to finesse his way around the Missouri Compromise did not work. Kentucky Whig Archibald Dixon believed that unless the Missouri Compromise was explicitly repealed, slaveholders would be reluctant to move to the new territory until slavery was approved by the settlers, who would most likely oppose slavery. On January 16 Dixon surprised Douglas by introducing an amendment that would repeal the section of the Missouri Compromise that prohibited slavery north of the 36°30' parallel. Douglas met privately with Dixon and in the end, despite his misgivings on Northern reaction, agreed to accept Dixon's arguments.

A similar amendment was offered in the House by Philip Phillips of Alabama. With the encouragement of the "F Street Mess", Douglas met with them and Phillips to ensure that the momentum for passing the bill remained with the Democratic Party. They arranged to meet with President Franklin Pierce to ensure that the issue would be declared a test of party loyalty within the Democratic Party.

=== Meeting with Pierce ===
Pierce was not enthusiastic about the implications of repealing the Missouri Compromise and had barely referred to Nebraska in his State of the Union message delivered December 5, 1853, just a month before. Close advisors Senator Lewis Cass of Michigan, a proponent of popular sovereignty as far back as 1848 as an alternative to the Wilmot Proviso, and Secretary of State William L. Marcy both told Pierce that repeal would create serious political problems. The full cabinet met and only Secretary of War Jefferson Davis and Secretary of Navy James C. Dobbin supported repeal. Instead, the president and cabinet submitted to Douglas an alternative plan that would have sought out a judicial ruling on the constitutionality of the Missouri Compromise. Both Pierce and Attorney General Caleb Cushing believed that the Supreme Court would find it unconstitutional.

Douglas's committee met later that night. Douglas was agreeable to the proposal, but the Atchison group was not. Determined to offer the repeal to Congress on January 23 but reluctant to act without Pierce's commitment, Douglas arranged through Davis to meet with Pierce on January 22 even though it was a Sunday when Pierce generally refrained from conducting any business. Douglas was accompanied at the meeting by Atchison, Hunter, Phillips, and John C. Breckinridge of Kentucky.

Douglas and Atchison first met alone with Pierce before the whole group convened. Pierce was persuaded to support repeal, and at Douglas' insistence, Pierce provided a written draft, asserting that the Missouri Compromise had been made inoperative by the principles of the Compromise of 1850. Pierce later informed his cabinet, which concurred with the change of direction. The Washington Union, the communications organ for the administration, wrote on January 24 that support for the bill would be "a test of Democratic orthodoxy".

=== Debate in Senate ===
On January 23, a revised bill was introduced in the Senate that repealed the Missouri Compromise and split the unorganized land into two new territories: Kansas and Nebraska. The division was the result of concerns expressed by settlers already in Nebraska as well as the senators from Iowa, who were concerned with the location of the territory's seat of government if such a large territory were created. As well, the bill's proposed border for Kansas was perceived by Southern legislators as the best method to ensure at least one slave state would be created by the law (Kansas was made to only border Missouri, a slave state, and therefore more likely to attract pro-slavery settlers). Existing language to affirm the application of all other laws of the United States in the new territory was supplemented by the language agreed on with Pierce: "except the eighth section of the act preparatory to the admission of Missouri into the Union, approved March 6, 1820 [the Missouri Compromise], which was superseded by the legislation of 1850, commonly called the compromise measures [the Compromise of 1850], and is declared inoperative." Identical legislation was soon introduced in the House.

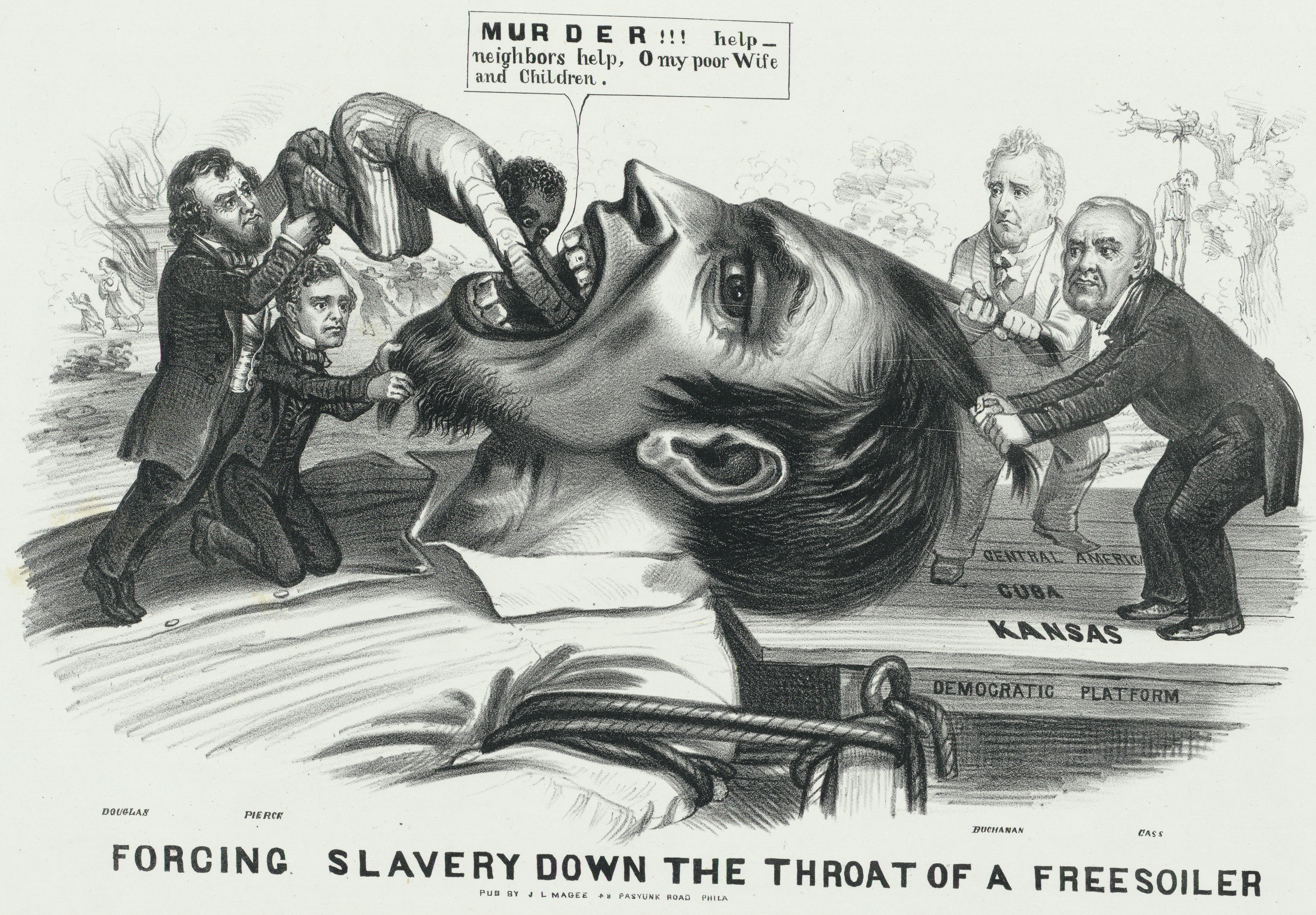
Forcing Slavery Down the Throat of a Freesoiler. An 1854 cartoon depicts a giant free soiler being held down by James Buchanan and Lewis Cass, standing on the Democratic platform of making slave states out of "Kansas", "Cuba", and "Central America". Franklin Pierce also holds down the giant's beard, as Stephen A. Douglas shoves a black man down his throat.

Historian Allan Nevins wrote that the country then became convulsed with two interconnected battles over slavery. A political battle was being fought in Congress over the question of slavery in the new states that were coming. At the same time, there was a moral debate. Southerners claimed that slavery was beneficent, endorsed by the Bible, and generally good policy, whose expansion must be supported. The publications and speeches of abolitionists, some of them former slaves themselves, were telling Northerners that the supposed beneficence of slavery was a Southern lie, and that enslaving another person was un-Christian, a horrible sin that must be fought. Both battles were "fought with a pertinacity, bitterness, and rancor unknown even in Wilmot Proviso days". The freesoilers were at a distinct disadvantage in Congress. The Democrats held large majorities in each house, and Douglas, "a ferocious fighter, the fiercest, most ruthless, and most unscrupulous that Congress had perhaps ever known", led a tightly disciplined party. In the nation at large, the opponents of Nebraska hoped to achieve a moral victory. The New York Times, which had earlier supported Pierce, predicted that this would be the last straw for Northern supporters of the slavery forces and would "create a deep-seated, intense, and ineradicable hatred of the institution which will crush its political power, at all hazards, and at any cost".

The day after the bill was reintroduced, two Ohioans, Representative Joshua Giddings and Senator Salmon P. Chase, published a free-soil response, "Appeal of the Independent Democrats in Congress to the People of the United States":

We arraign this bill as a gross violation of a sacred pledge; as a criminal betrayal of precious rights; as part and parcel of an atrocious plot to exclude from vast unoccupied region immigrants from the Old World and free laborers from our States, and convert it into a dreary region of despotism, inhabited by masters and slaves.

Douglas took the appeal personally and responded in Congress, when the debate was opened on January 30 before a full House and packed gallery. Douglas biographer Robert W. Johanssen described part of the speech:

Douglas charged the authors of the "Appeal", whom he referred to throughout as the "Abolitionist confederates", with having perpetrated a "base falsehood" in their protest. He expressed his sense of betrayal, recalling that Chase, "with a smiling face and the appearance of friendship", had appealed for a postponement of debate on the ground that he had not yet familiarized himself with the bill. "Little did I suppose at the time that I granted that act of courtesy", Douglas remarked, that Chase and his compatriots had published a document "in which they arraigned me as having been guilty of a criminal betrayal of my trust", of bad faith, and of plotting against the cause of free government. While other Senators were attending divine worship, they had been "assembled in a secret conclave", devoting the Sabbath to their own conspiratorial and deceitful purposes.

The debate would continue for four months, as many Anti-Nebraska political rallies were held across the north. Douglas remained the main advocate for the bill while Chase, William Seward, of New York, and Charles Sumner, of Massachusetts, led the opposition. The New-York Tribune wrote on March 2:

The unanimous sentiment of the North is indignant resistance. ... The whole population is full of it. The feeling in 1848 was far inferior to this in strength and universality.

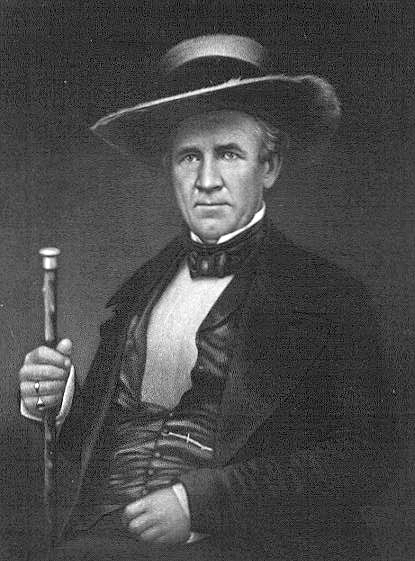
Sam Houston from Texas was one of the few southern opponents of the Kansas–Nebraska Act. In the debate, he urged, "Maintain the Missouri Compromise! Stir not up agitation! Give us peace!"

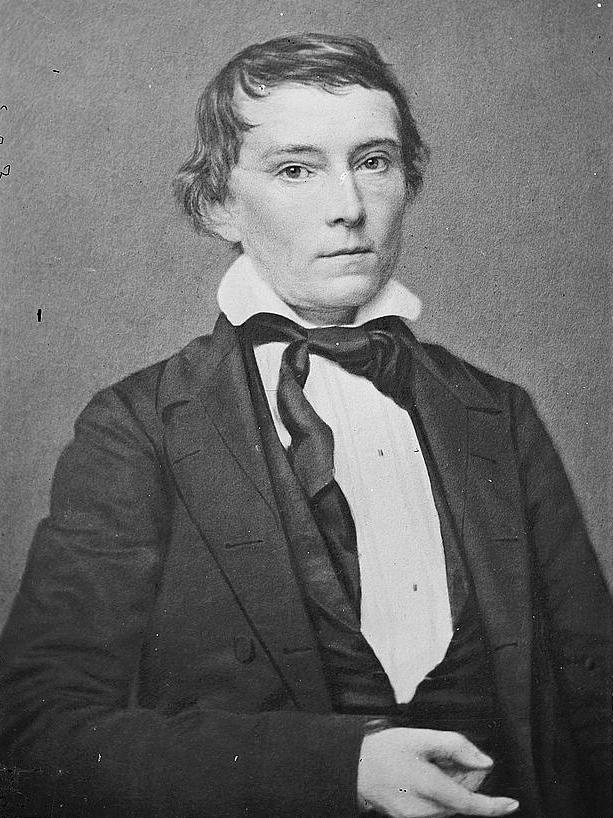
Alexander Stephens from Georgia – "Nebraska is through the House. I took the reins in my hand, applied the whip and spur, and brought the 'wagon' out at eleven o'clock P.M. Glory enough for one day."

The debate in the Senate concluded on March 4, 1854, when Douglas, beginning near midnight on March 3, made a five-and-a-half-hour speech. The final vote in favor of passage was 37 to 14. Free-state senators voted 14 to 12 in favor, and slave-state senators supported the bill 23 to 2.

=== Debate in House of Representatives ===
On March 21, 1854, as a delaying tactic in the House of Representatives, the legislation was referred by a vote of 110 to 95 to the Committee of the Whole, where it was the last item on the calendar. Realizing from the vote to stall that the act faced an uphill struggle, the Pierce administration made it clear to all Democrats that passage of the bill was essential to the party and would dictate how federal patronage would be handled. Davis and Cushing, from Massachusetts, along with Douglas, spearheaded the partisan efforts. By the end of April, Douglas believed that there were enough votes to pass the bill. The House leadership then began a series of roll call votes in which legislation ahead of the Kansas–Nebraska Act was called to the floor and tabled without debate.

Thomas Hart Benton was among those speaking forcefully against the measure. On April 25, in a House speech that biographer William Nisbet Chambers called "long, passionate, historical, [and] polemical", Benton attacked the repeal of the Missouri Compromise, which he "had stood upon ... above thirty years, and intended to stand upon it to the end—solitary and alone, if need be; but preferring company". The speech was distributed afterward as a pamphlet when opposition to the action moved outside the walls of Congress.

It was not until May 8 that the debate began in the House. The debate was even more intense than in the Senate. While it seemed to be a foregone conclusion that the bill would pass, the opponents went all out to fight it. Historian Michael Morrison wrote:

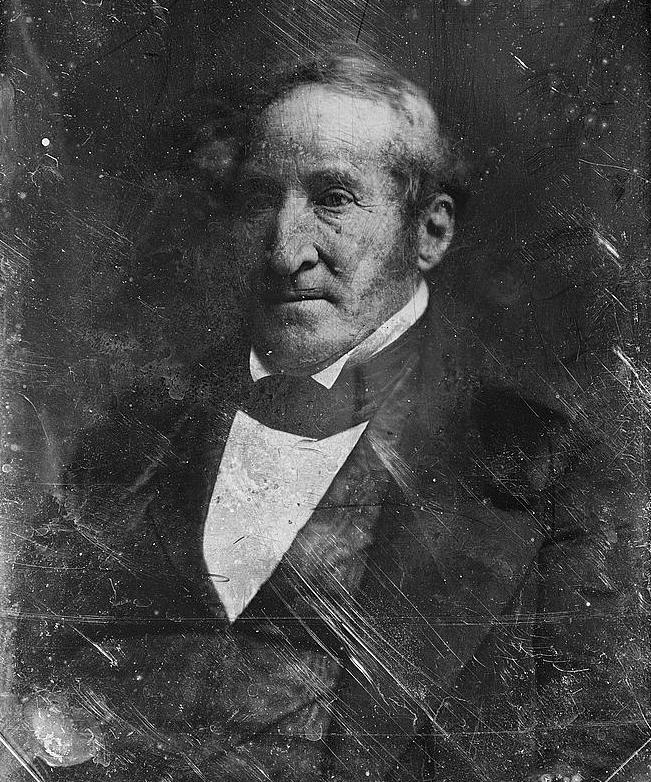
Thomas Hart Benton of Missouri – "What is the excuse for all this turmoil and mischief? We are told it is to keep the question of slavery out of Congress! Great God! It was out of Congress, completely, entirely, and forever out of Congress, unless Congress dragged it in by breaking down the sacred laws which settled it!"

A filibuster led by Lewis D. Campbell, an Ohio free-soiler, nearly provoked the House into a war of more than words. Campbell, joined by other antislavery northerners, exchanged insults and invectives with southerners, neither side giving quarter. Weapons were brandished on the floor of the House. Finally, bumptiousness gave way to violence. Henry A. Edmundson, a Virginia Democrat, well oiled and well-armed, had to be restrained from making a violent attack on Campbell. Only after the sergeant at arms arrested him, the debate was cut off, and the House adjourned did the melee subside.

The floor debate was handled by Alexander Stephens, of Georgia, who insisted that the Missouri Compromise had never been a true compromise but had been imposed on the South. He argued that the issue was whether republican principles, "that the citizens of every distinct community or State should have the right to govern themselves in their domestic matters as they please", would be honored.

The final House vote in favor of the bill was 113 to 100. Northern Democrats supported the bill 44 to 42, but all 45 northern Whigs opposed it. Southern Democrats voted in favor by 57 to 2, and Southern Whigs supported it by 12 to 7.

=== Enactment ===
President Franklin Pierce signed the Kansas–Nebraska Act into law on May 30, 1854. This act repealed the Missouri Compromise, "substituting for the ban on slavery what Douglas called 'popular sovereignty' ... arous[ing] a storm of protest throughout the North".

== Aftermath ==
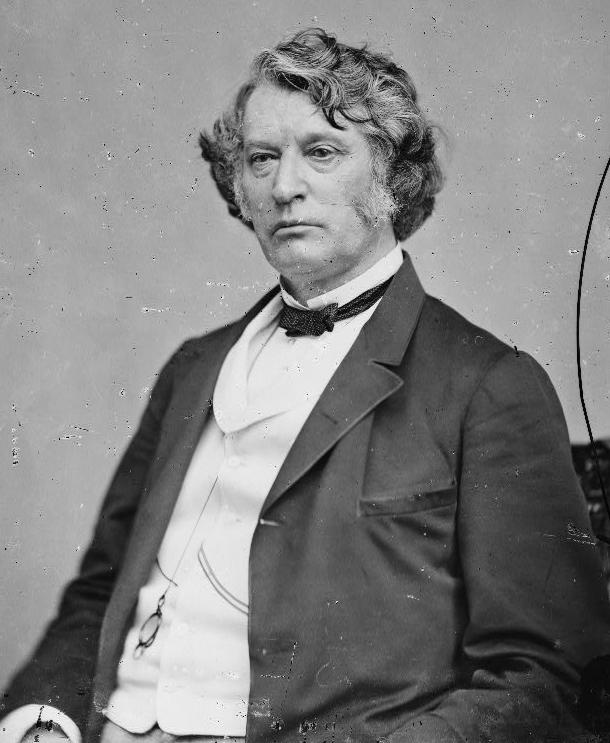
Charles Sumner on Stephen Douglas – "Alas! too often those principles which give consistency, individuality, and form to the Northern character, which renders it staunch, strong, and seaworthy, which bind it together as with iron, are drawn out, one by one, like the bolts of the ill-fitted vessel, and from the miserable, loosened fragments is formed that human anomaly—a Northern man with Southern principles. Sir, no such man can speak for the North."

Immediate responses to the passage of the Kansas–Nebraska Act fell into two classes. The less common response was held by Douglas's supporters, who believed that the bill would withdraw "the question of slavery from the halls of Congress and the political arena, committing it to the arbitration of those who were immediately interested in, and alone responsible for, its consequences". In other words, they believed that the Act would leave decisions about whether slavery would be permitted in the hands of the people rather than the Federal government. The far more common response was one of outrage, interpreting Douglas's actions as, in their words, "part and parcel of an atrocious plot to exclude from a vast unoccupied region emigrant from the Old World, and free laborers from our States, and convert it into a dreary region of despotism, inhabited by masters and slaves". Especially in the eyes of northerners, the Kansas–Nebraska Act was aggression and an attack on the power and beliefs of free states. The response led to calls for public action against the South, as seen in broadsides that advertised gatherings in northern states to discuss publicly what to do about the presumption of the Act.

Douglas and former Illinois Representative Abraham Lincoln aired their disagreement over the Kansas–Nebraska Act in seven public speeches during September and October 1854. Lincoln gave his most comprehensive argument against slavery and the provisions of the act in Peoria, Illinois, on October 16, in the Peoria Speech. He and Douglas both spoke to the large audience, Douglas first and Lincoln in response, two hours later. Lincoln's three-hour speech presented thorough moral, legal, and economic arguments against slavery and raised Lincoln's political profile for the first time. The speeches set the stage for the Lincoln-Douglas debates four years later, when Lincoln sought Douglas's Senate seat.

=== Bleeding Kansas ===
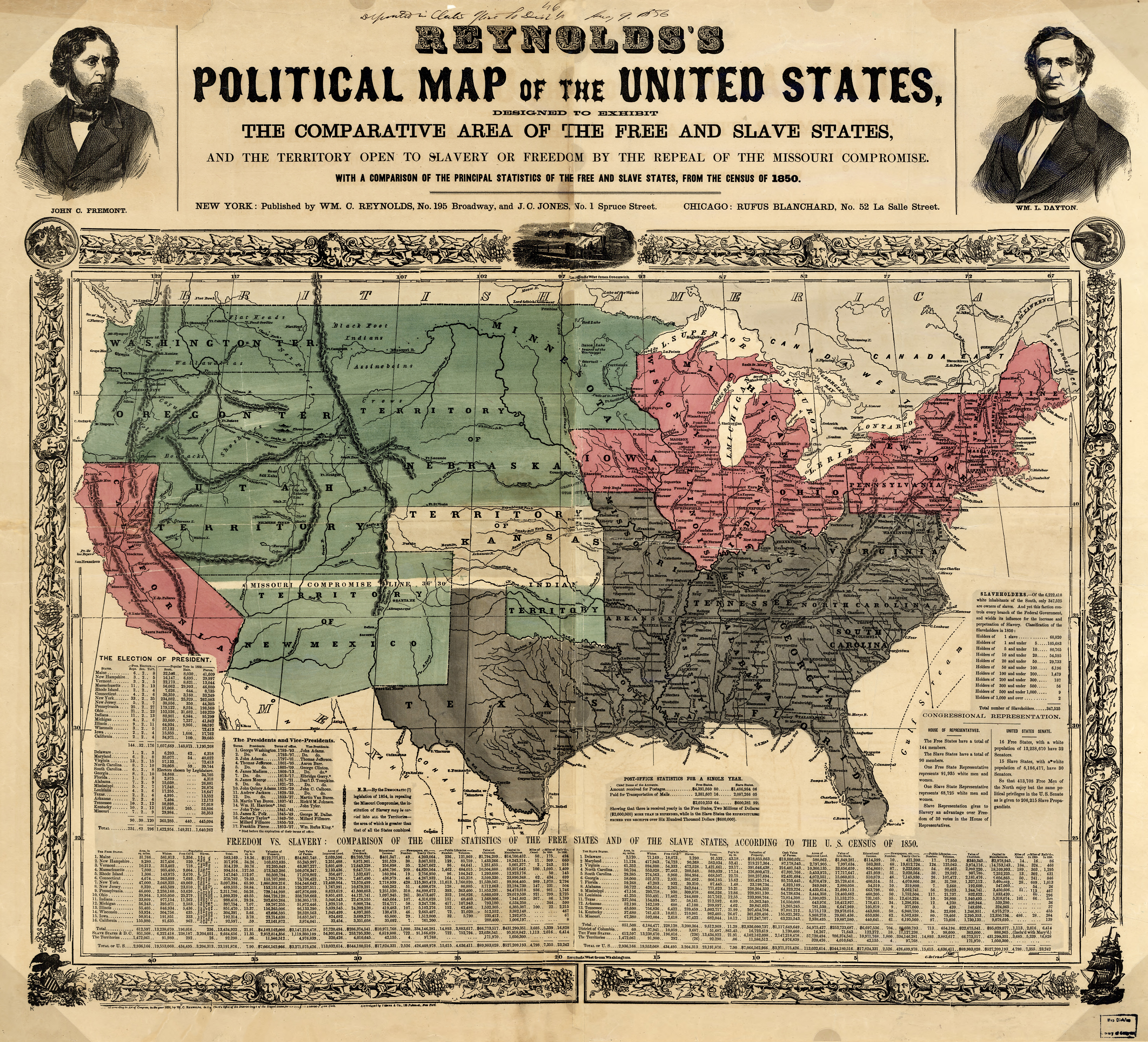
This 1856 map shows slave states (gray), free states (pink), U.S. territories (green), and Kansas (white).

Bleeding Kansas, Bloody Kansas, or the Border War was a series of violent political confrontations in the United States between 1854 and 1861 involving anti-slavery "Free-Staters" and pro-slavery "Border Ruffian", or "Southern" elements in Kansas. At the heart of the conflict was the question of whether Kansas would allow or outlaw slavery, and thus enter the Union as a slave state or a free state.

Pro-slavery settlers came to Kansas mainly from neighboring Missouri, successfully vote stacking to form a temporary pro-slavery government prior to statehood. Their influence in territorial elections was often bolstered by resident Missourians who crossed into Kansas solely for voting in such ballots. They formed groups such as the Blue Lodges and were dubbed border ruffians, a term coined by the opponent and abolitionist Horace Greeley. Free-State settlers moved to Kansas from different parts of the country to oppose the expansion of slavery and establish a free-state government. However, they did not all share the same beliefs about abolition or African American civil rights. The Free State movement included abolitionists who supported greater rights for African Americans as well as settlers who opposed slavery’s expansion but wanted Kansas to remain a territory for white settlers.

Successive territorial governors, usually sympathetic to slavery, attempted to maintain the peace. The territorial capital of Lecompton, the target of much agitation, became such a hostile environment for Free-Staters that they set up their own, unofficial legislature at Topeka.

Abolitionist John Brown and his sons gained notoriety in the fight against slavery by murdering five pro-slavery farmers with a broadsword in the 1856 Pottawatomie massacre. Brown also helped defend a few dozen Free-State supporters from several hundred angry pro-slavery supporters at Osawatomie.

=== Effect on American Indian tribes ===
Before the organization of the Kansas–Nebraska territory in 1854, the Kansas and Nebraska Territories were consolidated as part of the Indian Territory. Throughout the 1830s, the United States engaged in large-scale relocations of American Indian tribes to the Indian Territory, with many Southeastern nations removed to present-day Oklahoma, a process ordered by the Indian Removal Act of 1830 and also known as the Trail of Tears, and many Midwestern nations removed by way of the treaty to present-day Kansas. Among the latter were the Shawnee, Delaware, Kickapoo, Kaskaskia and Peoria, Ioway, and Miami. The passing of the Kansas–Nebraska Act came into direct conflict with the relocations. White American settlers from both the free-soil North and pro-slavery South flooded the Northern Indian Territory, hoping to influence the vote on slavery that would come following the admittance of Kansas and, to a lesser extent, Nebraska to the United States.

To address the reservation-settlement problem, US officials attempted further treaty negotiations with the tribes of Kansas and Nebraska. In 1854 alone, the U.S. agreed to acquire lands in Kansas or Nebraska from several tribes including the Kickapoo, Delaware, Omaha, Shawnee, Otoe and Missouri, Miami, and Kaskaskia and Peoria. In exchange for their land cessions, the tribes largely received small reservations in the Indian Territory of Oklahoma or Kansas in some cases.

For the nations that remained in Kansas beyond 1854, the Kansas–Nebraska Act introduced a host of other problems. In 1855, white "squatters" built the city of Leavenworth on the Delaware reservation without the consent of either Delaware or the US government. When Commissioner of Indian Affairs George Manypenny ordered military support in removing the squatters, both the military and the squatters refused to comply, undermining both Federal authority and the treaties in place with Delaware. Construction and infrastructure improvement projects promised in nearly every treaty, for example, took a great deal longer to complete than expected. Perhaps the most damaging violation by white American settlers was the mistreatment of American Indians and their properties. Numerous episodes of personal maltreatment, destroyed property, and deforestation at the hands of squatters were reported. Furthermore, the squatters' premature and illegal settlement of the Kansas Territory jeopardized the value of the land, and with it the future of the Indian tribes living on them. Because treaties were land cessions and purchases, the value of the land handed over to the Federal government was critical to the payment received by a given Indian nation. Deforestation, destruction of property, and other general injuries to the land lowered the value of the territories that were ceded by the Kansas Territory Indian tribes.

Manypenny's 1856 "Report on Indian Affairs" further explained the devastating effect on Indian populations of diseases that white settlers brought to Kansas. Without providing statistics, Indian Affairs Superintendent to the area Colonel Alfred Cumming reported at least more deaths than births in most tribes in the territory. While noting intemperance, or alcoholism, as a leading cause of death, Cumming specifically cited cholera, smallpox, and measles, none of which the American Indians were able to ameliorate. The disastrous effects of such disease were exemplified by deaths among the Osage people. The Osage had already encountered epidemics associated with relocation and white settlement prior to 1854. The initial removal acts in the 1830s had brought both white American settlers and foreign American Indian tribes to the Great Plains and into contact with the Osage people. Between 1829 and 1843, influenza, cholera, and smallpox killed an estimated 1,242 Osage Indians, resulting in a population recession of roughly 20 percent between 1830 and 1850. Between 1852 and 1856, an estimated 1,300 Osage people lost their lives to scurvy, measles, smallpox, and scrofula, contributing, in part, to a massive decline in population, from 8,000 in 1850 to just 3,500 in 1860.

=== Destruction of the Whig party ===
From a political standpoint, the Whig Party had been in decline in the South because of the effectiveness with which it had been hammered by the Democratic Party over slavery. The Southern Whigs hoped that by seizing the initiative on this issue, they would be identified as strong defenders of slavery. Many Northern Whigs broke with them in the Act.

The American party system had been dominated by Whigs and Democrats for decades leading up to the Civil War. But the Whig party's increasing internal divisions had made it a party of strange bedfellows by the 1850s. An ascendant anti-slavery wing clashed with a traditionalist and increasingly pro-slavery Southern wing. These divisions came to a head in the 1852 election, where Whig candidate Winfield Scott was trounced by Franklin Pierce. Southern Whigs had already felt burned by prior Whig president Zachary Taylor, and were unwilling to support another potentially anti-slavery Whig candidate (Taylor, despite being a slave owner himself, had proved willing to stand against slaveholder interests during his presidency). The erosion of Southern Whig support alongside the loss of votes in the North to the Free Soil Party doomed the Whigs, who would never again contest a presidential election.

The Kansas–Nebraska Act was also the spark that began the Republican Party, which would bring together former Whigs, Free Soilers, and anti-slavery Democrats to oppose slavery in a manner that the Whig Party had never truly could. Since the act was viewed by anti-slavery Northerners as an aggressive, expansionist maneuver by the slave-owning South, opponents became intensely motivated to form a new party capable of checking this expansion. From its inception, the party was a coalition of the anti-slavery forces within American politics at that time.

The first anti-Nebraska local meeting where "Republican" was suggested as a name for a new anti-slavery party was held in a Ripon, Wisconsin schoolhouse on March 20, 1854. The first statewide convention that formed a platform and nominated candidates under the Republican name was held near Jackson, Michigan, on July 6, 1854. At that convention, the party opposed the expansion of slavery into new territories and selected a statewide slate of candidates. The Midwest took the lead in forming state Republican Party tickets; apart from St. Louis and a few areas adjacent to free states, there were no efforts to organize the Party in the Southern states. So was born the Republican Party—campaigning on the popular, emotional issue of "free soil" in the frontier—which would capture the White House just six years later.

=== Later developments ===
The Kansas–Nebraska Act divided the nation and pointed it toward civil war. House Democrats suffered huge losses in the midterm elections of 1854, as voters provided support to a wide array of new parties that opposed the Democrats and the Kansas–Nebraska Act. Pierce deplored the new Republican Party, because of its perceived anti-Southern, anti-slavery stance. To Northerners, the President's perceived Southern bias did anything but de-escalate public mood and helped inflame abolitionist anger.

Partly due to the unpopularity of the Kansas–Nebraska Act, Pierce lost his bid for re-nomination at the 1856 Democratic National Convention to James Buchanan. Pierce was the first elected president who actively sought reelection but was denied his party's nomination for a second term. Republicans nominated John C. Frémont in the 1856 presidential election and campaigned on "Bleeding Kansas" and the unpopularity of the Kansas–Nebraska Act. Buchanan won the election, but Frémont carried a majority of the free states. Two days after Buchanan's inauguration, Chief Justice Roger Taney delivered the Dred Scott decision, which asserted that Congress had no constitutional power to exclude slavery in the territories. Douglas continued to support the doctrine of popular sovereignty, but Buchanan insisted that Democrats respect the Dred Scott decision and its repudiation of federal interference with slavery in the territories.

Guerrilla warfare in Kansas continued throughout Buchanan's presidency and extended into the 1860s, continuing until the American Civil War ended in 1865, with many unjust killings and lootings performed by partisans on either side of the border. Buchanan attempted to admit Kansas as a state under the pro-slavery Lecompton Constitution, but Kansas voters rejected that constitution in an August 1858 referendum. Anti-slavery delegates won a majority of the elections to the 1859 Kansas constitutional convention, and Kansas won admission as a free state under the anti-slavery Wyandotte Constitution in the final months of Buchanan's presidency.

== See also ==
- History of slavery in Nebraska
- History of slavery in Kansas
- Bibliography of Franklin Pierce
