= John Tyler and slavery =

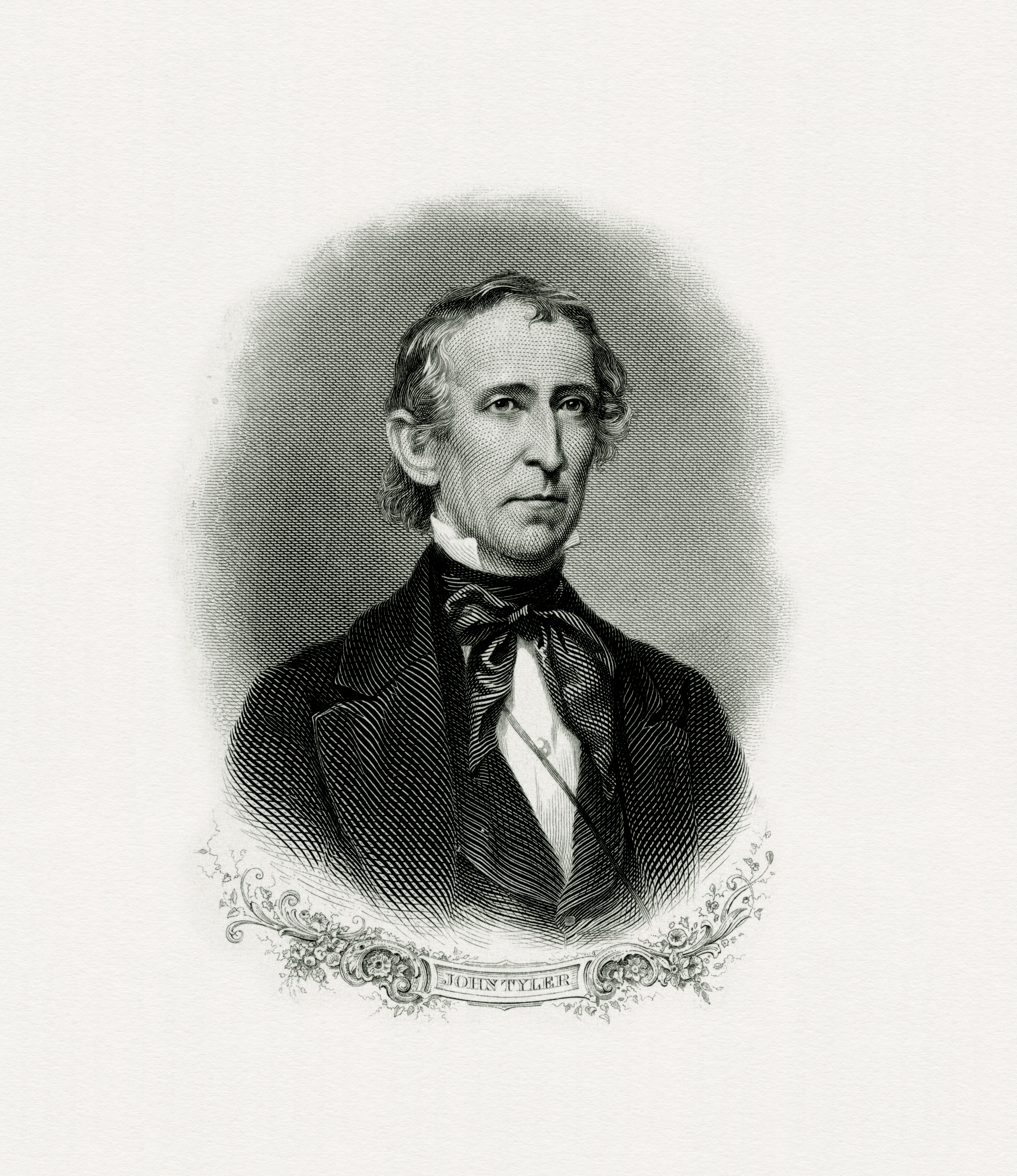
Engraving portrait of President John Tyler

John Tyler, the tenth President of the United States, owned slaves throughout his lifetime. Many of his policies as president reflected pro-slavery ideals with efforts to protect Southern interests and resist abolitionist influences, both domestically and internationally.

== Slave owning and early views on slavery ==
While estimates vary, U.S. president John Tyler owned as many as 50—and perhaps up to several hundred—slaves during his lifetime. Many of these enslaved individuals, as well as some free African-American servants, worked at the White House during his administration.

Tyler reportedly sold multiple slaves to finance his political career; he first attempted to sell a woman named Ann Eliza during his Senate run, and according to a news item from 1943 on slave-owning presidents, "It is said that John Tyler sold one of his slaves to defray his expenses when he went to Washington to assume his duties as vice-president of the United States." The names of three people enslaved by Tyler are known to researchers through the historical record:

- Armistead, a young valet who was killed in the explosion of the USS Princeton
- James Hambleton Christian, a half-brother of Tyler's first wife Letitia Christian
- Aunt Fanny

== Allegations of illegitimate children ==
In the 1840s, abolitionist publisher Joshua Leavitt alleged that Tyler fathered multiple enslaved children in an article known as "Tyler-Ising." Leavitt named two of these mixed-race sons, John and Charles Tyler, and implied that Tyler had sold many other illegitimate slave children. Tyler is also alleged by descendants to have been the father of John Dunjee (born 1833), though this remains unproven.

== Policies on slavery ==
Tyler staunchly defended the institution of slavery in his political appointments and foreign policy. His cabinet was composed largely of wealthy southern slaveowners and even alleged disunionists, including Abel Parker Upshur and John C. Calhoun. Tyler sent a political adviser, Duff Green, to England as a secret "proslavery emissary" to discourage British abolitionist interference in American affairs; Tyler supported the theory that British interference with American slavery was intended to weaken the United States and promote British diplomatic gains.

Tyler's beliefs and the proslavery political advice he received led to the defeat of the Quintuple Treaty in 1841, which would have limited the African slave trade, an action Tyler claimed to support earlier in his career. During this time, Tyler also strengthened the US navy to protect the American South from potential antislavery-driven foreign invasions.

During his presidency, Tyler became increasingly afraid of slave insurrection, causing him to strongly oppose the recognition of Haiti. He viewed slave uprisings in the Caribbean as a threat to the American South and enacted various measures to denounce, contain, and even actively destabilize Haitian revolutionaries. For instance, Tyler supported—and even allegedly sent unauthorized military aid to—the Dominican Republic to resist Black rule in Haiti.

At the end of his presidency, Tyler supported the Annexation of Texas (which occurred under his successor, Polk), an action that he claimed would prevent British influence from dominating Texas. As Texas was presumed to enter the Union as a slave state, annexation would enhance the power of the proslavery South.

== See also ==
- John Tyler § Planter and lawyer
- List of presidents of the United States who owned slaves
- List of vice presidents of the United States who owned slaves
