= Eva Bates =

American domestic servant (1799–1903)

Eva Bates (September 1, 1799 – May 24?, 1903) was an American domestic servant who worked for two U.S. Presidents, John Adams and James Monroe.

Eva Bates was also known as Mammy Bates. According to news reports published at the time of her death, she was born enslaved to enslaved parents in "Flushing, L.I." She was first employed by John Adams. After his death she was hired into the household of James Monroe. She was married three times and outlived all three husbands. She was the mother to 14 children, most of whom predeceased her. She moved into a retirement home in New York around 1887.

Since she became an inmate of the home she spent most of her time in the mending room. She showed few signs of her great age and was able to use her needle until the day of her death. Superintendent Lake of the home said yesterday that she was one of the most interesting characters he had ever known and that her recollections of Presidents Adams and Monroe were very vivid.

She died a centenarian in Lincoln Hospital, also known as the Colored Home and Hospital, located at 141st St. and Southern Boulevard in New York.

== See also ==
- Mammy stereotype
- List of presidents of the United States who owned slaves
