= Zachary Taylor and slavery =

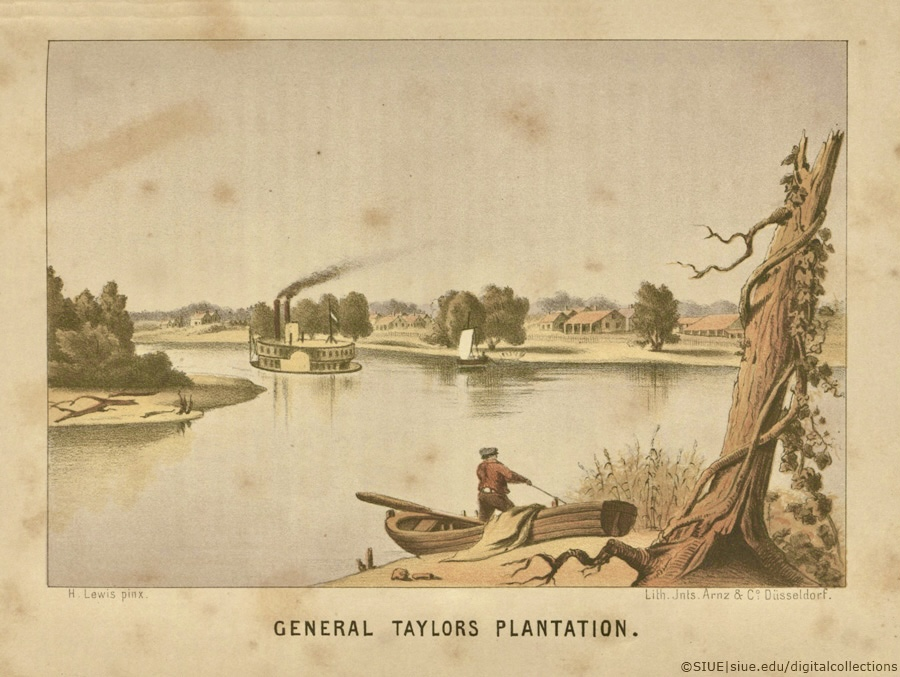
"General Taylor's Plantation" probably depicted 1840s, from Das illustrirte Mississippithal by Henry Lewis (SIUE Digital)

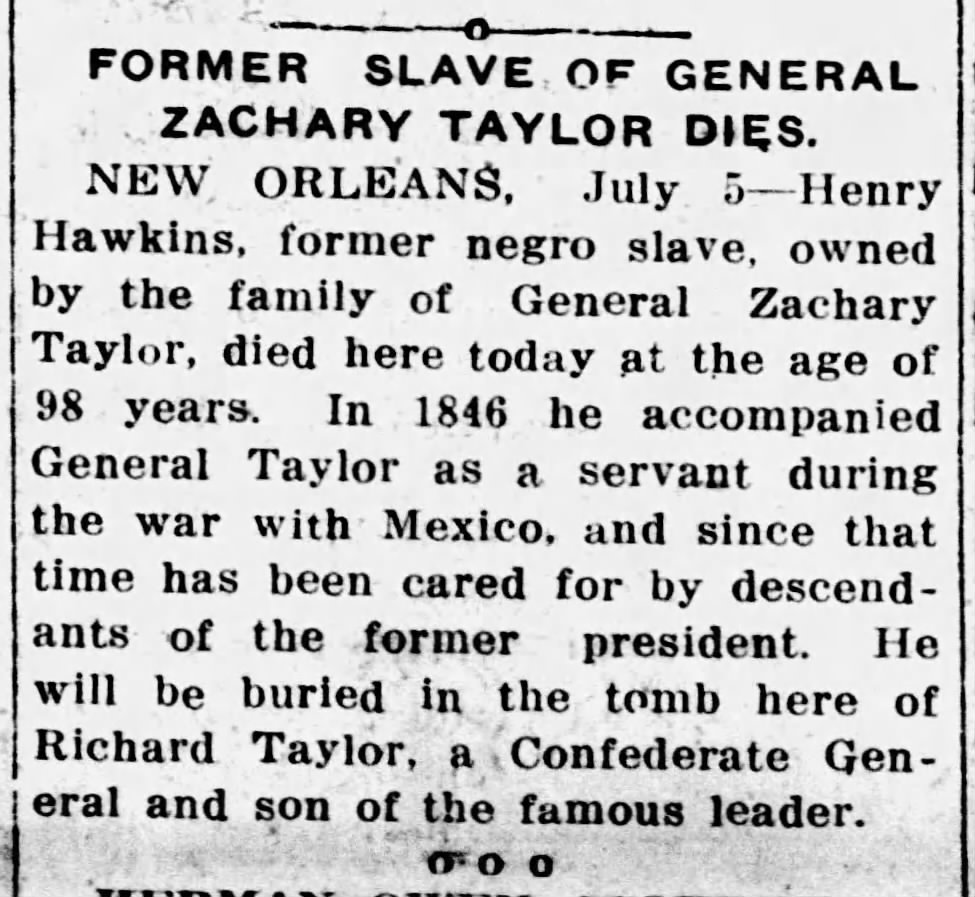
Henry Hawkins (1819–1917) accompanied Taylor on his Mexican-American War campaigns ("Former slave of General Zachary Taylor dies" Natchez Democrat, July 6, 1917)

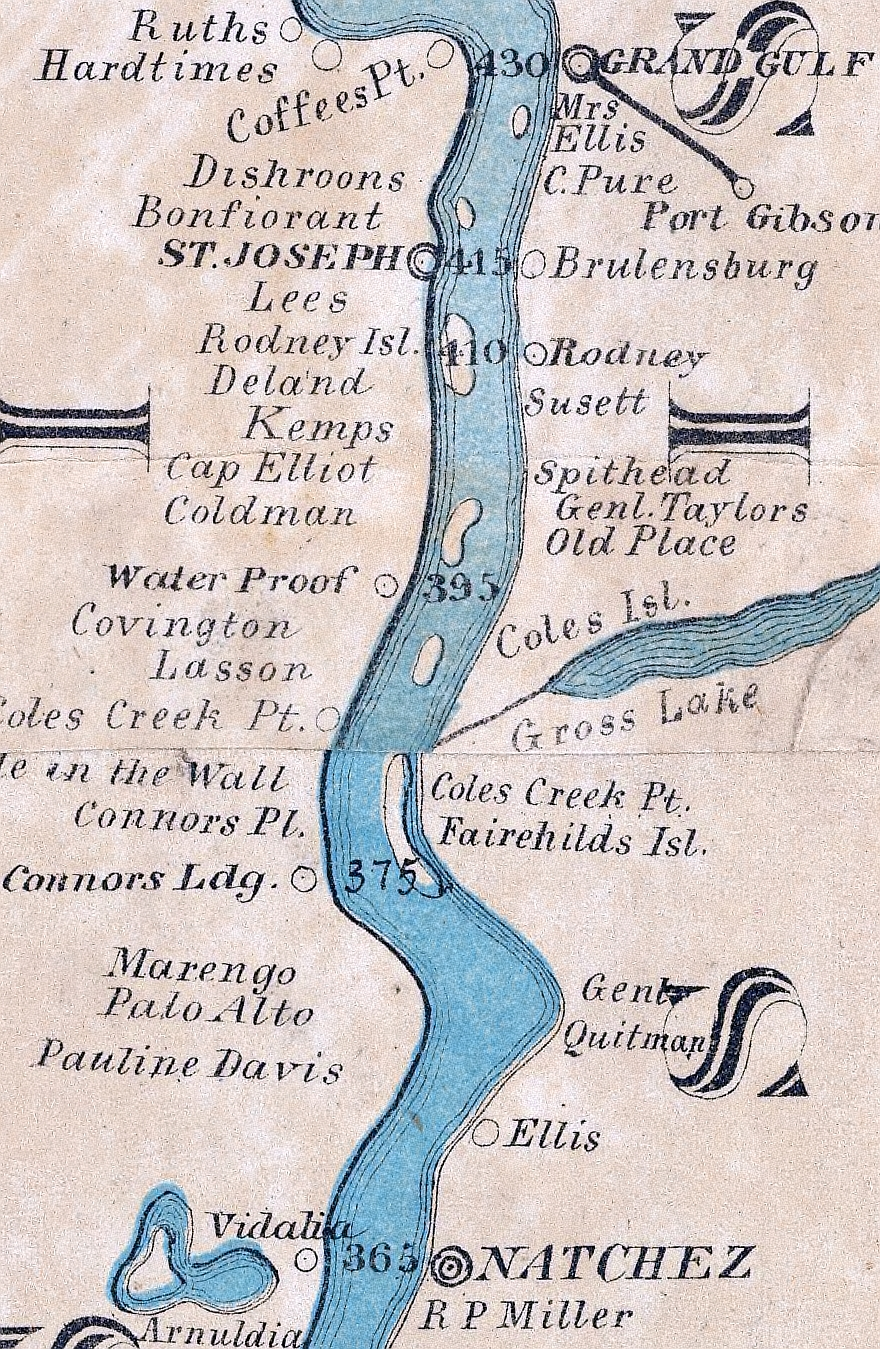
Map from 1866 showing Cypress Grove Plantation along the Mississippi River as "Genl. Taylors Old Place"

Zachary Taylor, the 12th U.S. president (from 1849 to 1850), owned slaves throughout his life. On the campaign trail, his exact position on the subject was generally vague. However, as President, he generally resisted attempts to expand slavery in the territories and opposed the Compromise of 1850. Far from an abolitionist, his resistance to slavery's expansion nevertheless put Taylor at odds with other contemporary slaveholders in the United States government.

== Policy ==
Taylor's strongest stance towards slavery came from his opposition to the Compromise of 1850. The compromise would have admitted California into the Union as a free state and banned the slave trade in Washington, D.C. in exchange for allowing most of the remaining territory captured from Mexico to decide the issue of slavery locally, and passing a federal fugitive slave law requiring state authorities to assist federal marshals in capturing and detaining escaped slaves. It ultimately opened the door towards further slavery expansion, which Taylor opposed. However, he died in office before he could veto the bill, leading to its successful passage under his successor Millard Fillmore.

After his death, there were rumors that slavery advocates had poisoned Taylor; tests of his body over 100 years later have been inconclusive.

== Personal slaves ==
Taylor was a cotton planter who is believed to have owned, at minimum, 81 slaves when he became president. Taylor's slave ownership was a campaign issue in 1848, with opponents asserting that he would oppose the Wilmot Proviso and abolition because he owned 200-some slaves on two plantations in Mississippi and Louisiana and had recently invested heavily in "negroes" with purchases at the slave market in New Orleans. Taylor reportedly paid taxes on ownership of 114 slaves in Jefferson County, Mississippi in 1848. In 1848 slave trader Bernard M. Campbell sold two enslaved people to presidential candidate Zachary Taylor for $1500 (~$43,874 in 2024). Taylor both inherited slaves from his father, and did not free any of his slaves in his will, choosing instead to bequeath them to his children upon his death.

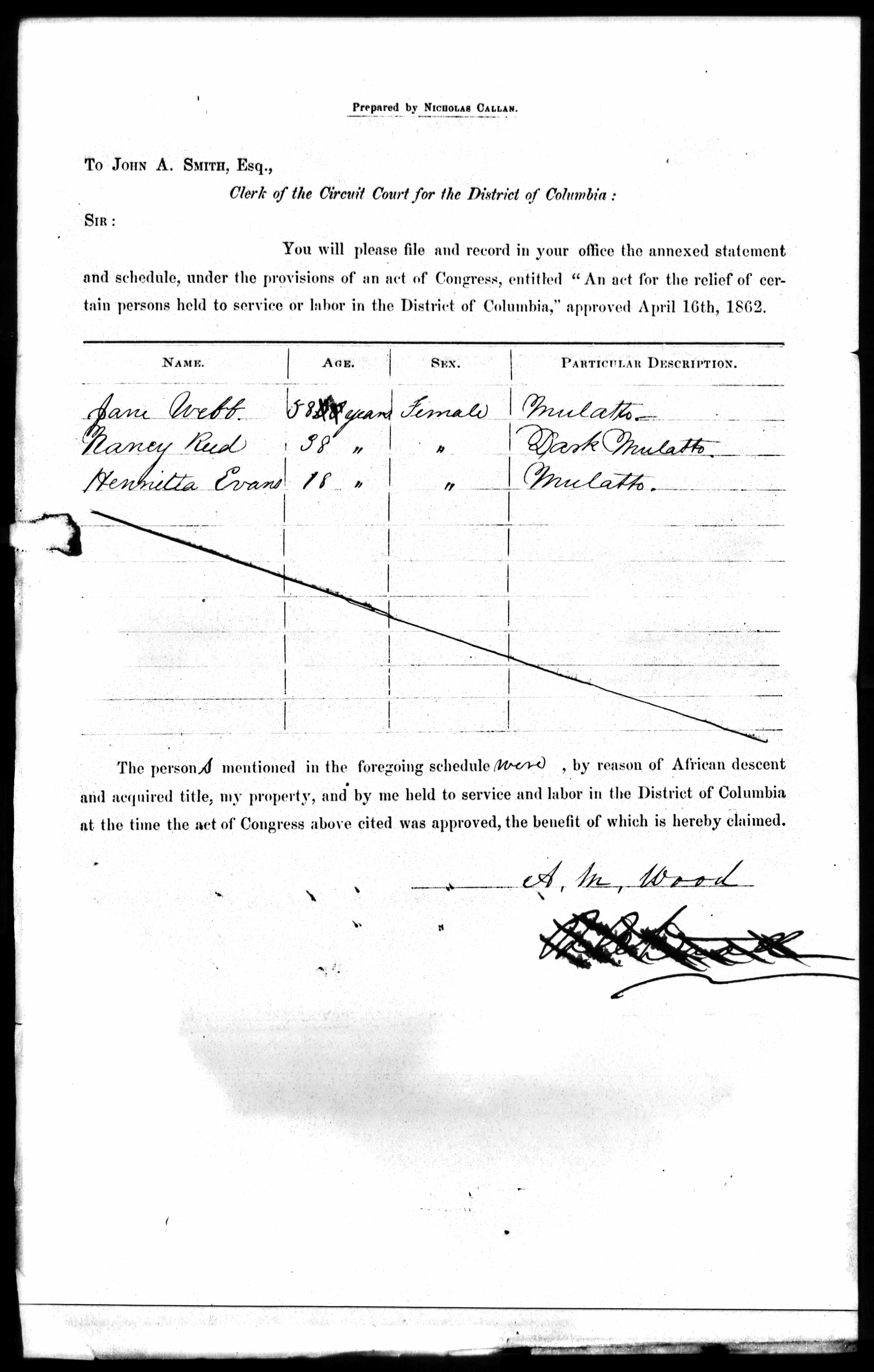
Ann Margaret Mackall Taylor Wood request for compensation for value of three enslaved people, including Jane Webb

Researchers believe that Charles Porter, Tom, Jane Webb, and William some of the enslaved people brought to the White House by Zachary Taylor. In 1861, Taylor's daughter submitted Jane Webb's name to the District of Columbia Compensated Emancipation program in which the government compensated slave owners for the value of their freed slaves.

== Dick Taylor ==
Taylor's son Dick Taylor owned a sugar plantation, became an admired Confederate general, an opponent of Reconstruction, a Democratic Party (Third Party System) activist, and noted writer of history and memoir.

== See also ==
- Polk Taylor – Formerly enslaved Methodist minister (1833–1934)
- List of United States presidents who owned slaves
