= Paul Jennings (abolitionist) =

American abolitionist and writer (c. 1799–1874)

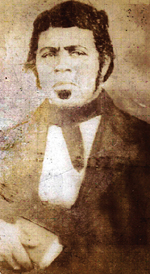
- Jennings, c. 1850s
- Born: c. 1799; Orange County, Virginia, U.S.
- Died: 1874 (aged 74–75); Washington, D.C., U.S.
- Occupation: Author

Paul Jennings (c. 1799 – 1874) was an American abolitionist and writer. Enslaved as a young man by President James Madison during and after his White House years, Jennings published, in 1865, the first White House memoir. His book was A Colored Man's Reminiscences of James Madison, described as "a singular document in the history of slavery and the early American republic."

Living in Washington, D.C., from 1837 on, Jennings made many valuable connections and was aided by the northern Whig Senator Daniel Webster in gaining freedom. In the 1850s, Jennings traveled to Virginia, where he tracked down his children, who had grown up on a neighboring plantation with his wife, Fanny, who was also enslaved. His relatives on his mother's side were sold by the widow Dolley Madison with Montpelier in 1844. His three sons joined the Union cause during the American Civil War.

In 2009, his descendants were honored at Montpelier after a lecture on Jennings. They were also invited to a private viewing at the White House of Gilbert Stuart's Lansdowne Portrait, a 1796 painting of George Washington.

== Early life and education ==
Jennings was enslaved at birth at Montpelier in about 1799; his mother, who was African-Native American, was enslaved by the Madisons. She told the boy his father was Benjamin Jennings, an English trader. The mixed-race Jennings, as an enslaved child, was a companion to Dolley's son Payne Todd. He began to serve James Madison as his footman and later was trained as his "body servant". At the age of 10, Jennings accompanied Madison and his family to the White House after the statesman was elected president. In his 1865 memoir, he noted that the East Room was yet unfinished from the first construction, most of the Washington streets were unpaved; the city was "a dreary place" in those years.

In 1814, during the Burning of Washington, as British troops were approaching the White House, Jennings, at age 15, with the president's steward Jean-Pierre Sioussat and Gardener Thomas McGrath reportedly helped save the noted Gilbert Stuart portrait of George Washington known as the Lansdowne Portrait. Other people enslaved at the White House helped save such valuables as silver. (The portrait was returned to the White House, where it is the only surviving item from before the War of 1812.) Legend has it that he assisted First Lady Dolley Madison in this effort. In his memoir, Jennings wrote that a French cook and one other person did the physical work of taking down the painting.

== Post-White House years ==
After the president ended his second term, the Madisons returned to Montpelier in 1817, bringing Jennings. He was 18 years old and continued to serve Madison as his valet for the rest of the president's life. Jennings married Fanny, an enslaved woman held on another plantation, and they had five children who lived with their mother. Jennings was with Madison when he died in 1836.

In 1837, the widow Dolley Madison took Jennings with her when she returned to Washington, D.C., to live in the winter seasons. He was forced to leave his family behind but was permitted to visit them occasionally. In 1841, she wrote her will, which would free Jennings after her death, the only enslaved person whom she freed in her will. In Washington as an adult, Jennings saw a much broader community. Among its many free blacks at the time were descendants of slaves of the former presidents Washington, Jefferson, and Madison.

Struggling financially, in 1844, Dolley Madison sold Montpelier and all its property, including its slaves, to raise money to live on. That year, Fanny, Jennings's wife, died in Virginia. The following year, Dolley Madison hired out Jennings to President James Polk in Washington. Often enslaved people who were hired out got to keep a portion of their earnings, but she kept it all.

== Freedom ==
Fearing for his future, Jennings tried to arrange a purchase price with Madison, but she sold him to an insurance agent in 1846 for US$200 (equivalent to $7,167 in 2025). Six months later, Senator Daniel Webster intervened to buy him from the new owner for $120 (equivalent to $4,300 in 2025) and gave Jennings his freedom, for which he paid the senator in work. He entered the large free black community of Washington, which outnumbered enslaved people by three to one at the time.

In 1848, Jennings helped plan a mass escape of 77 enslaved people from Washington, D.C., on the schooner Pearl. It was the largest escape attempt by enslaved people in US history. In an effort funded by white abolitionists William L. Chaplin and Gerrit Smith, the free black community of Washington enlarged the escape, gathering tens of enslaved people willing to risk the 225-mile (362 km) sailing journey to freedom in the North.

The fugitives were captured and returned to Washington after being delayed by poor winds. Their owners quickly sold them to traders, and most were sold again in the Deep South. The freedom of some enslaved people, including the two Edmonson sisters, was purchased by families and friends. The Edmonsons were sponsored to go to school in New York State and later spoke at abolitionist lectures. The two white captains, Daniel Drayton and Edward Sayres, owner and pilot of the schooner Pearl, were convicted on multiple counts of aiding a slave escape and illegally transporting enslaved people. They served four years in jail before being pardoned by President Millard Fillmore.

The following year, Jennings married again to Desdemona Brooks, a free mulatta whose mother was white (according to Partus sequitur ventrem, children took the status of their mother). She lived in Alexandria, Virginia.

Jennings returned to Virginia in the 1850s as a free man and reunited with his family, whom he had been forced to leave years before. His three sons joined the Union cause during the American Civil War after escaping and joining Union lines. John, Franklin, William and daughter Mary later joined him in Washington and the area.

After the war, Jennings worked at the newly established Pension Bureau, part of the Department of the Interior, to handle claims of veterans and soldiers' families. He made the acquaintance of John Brooks Russell, an antiquarian. Russell wrote it down because of Jennings's story of his years with Madison. He published it for him in January 1863 in The Historical Magazine and Notes and Queries Concerning the Antiquities, History and Biography of America, to which Russell had contributed. He helped Jennings gain publication of his memoir as a book in 1865. It is considered the first White House memoir.

A free man, Jennings bought a lot and built a house at 1804 L Street, NW. He had reunited with his children, and his son John lived with him. His daughter Mary lived next door with her two children. His sons Franklin and William also lived in the area.

After Desdemona's death, Jennings married a third time in 1870 to Amelia Dorsey.

He died in northwest Washington, D.C., at the age of 75 in 1874. He was buried at Columbian Harmony Cemetery in D.C. When that cemetery closed in 1959, the remains of those buried there were reinterred at National Harmony Memorial Park in Landover, Maryland. However, Jennings's remains (along with others unclaimed by family members) were lost in this process. In his will, Jennings left his family his house and property in northwest Washington.

== Works ==
- Paul Jennings, A Colored Man's Reminiscences of James Madison (1865), reprint copy available at Google books.

== Legacy and honors ==
- In 2009, Montpelier staff gave a lecture about Jennings, "Paul Jennings: Enamoured with Freedom", and had a reception for his descendants at the estate.
- Also in 2009, the Montpelier Foundation arranged a private visit for Jennings's descendants to the White House to see the Gilbert Stuart portrait of George Washington and celebrate Jennings for his efforts during the War of 1812.
- Dolley Madison Directing the Rescue of George Washington's Portrait, August 24, 1814 (2009) is a mural by the artist William Woodward, which was commissioned by the Montpelier Foundation.
- One of his descendants lives in a rowhouse in Georgetown, Washington, D.C., which his family has owned since the 19th century.
- James Madison University honored Jennings on February 8, 2019, by naming a new residence hall after him.

== See also ==
- James Madison and slavery
- List of slaves

== Bibliography ==
- Taylor, Elizabeth Dowling (2012). A Slave in the White House: Paul Jennings and the Madisons. New York: Palgrave Macmillan. ISBN 9780230108936.
