= James Madison and slavery =

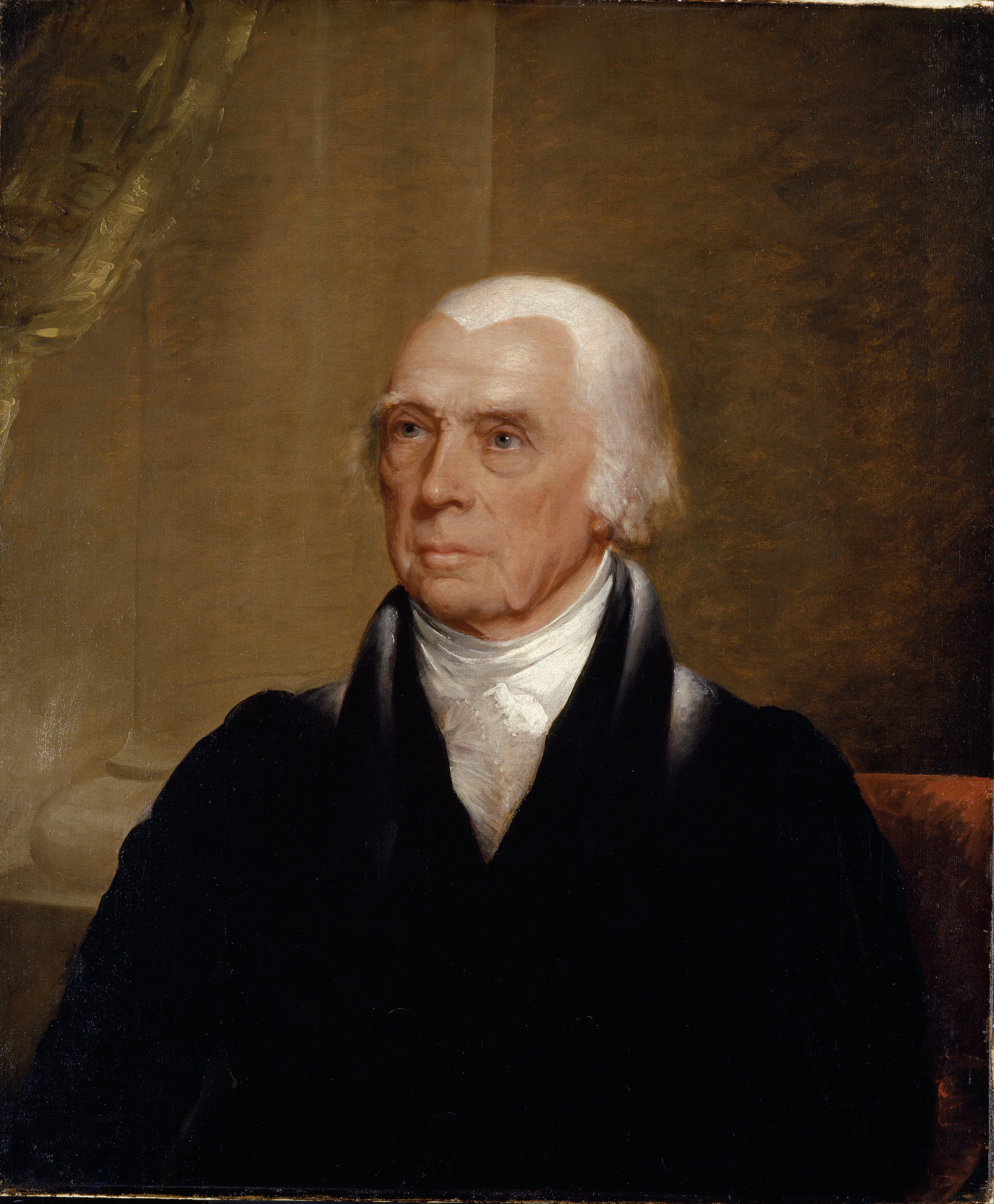
Portrait by Chester Harding, c. 1800–1815

Throughout his life, James Madison's views on slavery and his ownership of slaves were complex. Madison, who was a Founding Father of the United States and the 4th president, grew up on a plantation that made use of slave labor. He viewed slavery as a necessary part of the Southern economy, though he was troubled by the instability of a society that depended on a large slave population. Madison did not free his slaves during his lifetime or in his will.

== Views ==
During the American Revolutionary War, Madison responded to a proposal of providing slaves to soldiers as a recruitment bonus by advocating enlisting blacks in exchange for their freedom instead, writing "would it not be as well to liberate and make soldiers at once of the blacks themselves as to make them instruments for enlisting white Soldiers? It would certainly be more consonant to the principles of liberty which ought never to be loss sight of in a contest for liberty." At the Philadelphia Convention, Madison wrote "Where slavery exists the republican Theory becomes still more fallacious." He favored an immediate end to the importation of slaves, though the final document barred Congress from interfering with the international slave trade until 1808.

Madison initially opposed the 20-year ban on ending the international slave trade. However, he eventually accepted it as a necessary compromise to get the South to ratify the constitution, later writing, "It ought to be considered as a great point gained in favor of humanity, that a period of twenty years may terminate forever, within these States, a traffic which has long and so loudly upbraided the barbarism of modern policy." He also proposed that apportionment in the House of Representatives be allocated according the total of each state's free population and slave population, eventually leading to the adoption of the Three-fifths Compromise. Madison supported the extension of slavery into the West during the Missouri crisis of 1819–1821. Madison believed that former slaves were unlikely to successfully integrate into Southern society, and in the late 1780s, he became interested in the idea of African-Americans establishing colonies in Africa. Madison served as the president of the American Colonization Society, which founded the settlement of Liberia for former slaves.

Although Madison had supported a republican form of government, he believed that slavery had caused the South to become aristocratic. Madison believed that slaves were human property, while he opposed slavery intellectually. Along with his colonization plan for black people, Madison believed that slavery would naturally diffuse with western expansion. His political views landed somewhere between John C. Calhoun's separation nullification and Daniel Webster's nationalism consolidation. Madison was never able to reconcile his advocacy of republican government with his exclusion of slaves from the process of government and his lifelong reliance on the slave system. Visitors to his plantation noted slaves were well housed and fed. According to Paul Jennings, one of Madison's younger slaves, Madison never lost his temper or had his slaves whipped, preferring to reprimand. Madison never outwardly expressed the view that blacks were inferior; he tended to express open-mindedness on the question of race.

== Personal ownership of slaves ==
Madison's father James Madison Sr. left his son several slaves in his will:

- "slaves already given to him"
- "Billy, which he has since sold"
- "Davey, Sinnar, Winney, Alexander, John, Amy, &c."

When Madison moved to Washington, D.C. in 1801, to serve as the secretary of state of President Jefferson, Madison brought slaves from Montpelier. He also hired out slaves in Washington, D.C. but paid their masters, rather than the slaves, who did the work.

During Madison's presidency, his White House slaves included John Freeman, Jennings, Sukey, Joseph Bolden, Jim, and Abram. Madison was referred to as a "garden-variety slaveholder" by historian Elizabeth Dowling Taylor. Madison was not excessively cruel to his slaves, to avoid criticism from his peers and to curb slave revolts. Madison worked his slaves from dawn to dusk, six days a week, leaving them Sundays off for rest. By 1801, Madison's slave population at Montpelier was slightly over 100. During the 1820s and 1830s, Madison was forced by debts to sell land and slaves. In 1836, at the time of Madison's death, he owned 36 taxable slaves. Madison did not free any of his slaves either during his lifetime or in his will.

A 1901 account gave the names of four slaves attached to Montpelier in Madison's time:

- Paul Jennings, "major domo and body servant to Madison"
- Reuben, "a worthless scamp who Madison used to threaten to personally castigate"
- "Tukey and Betsy in the kitchen, one famous for her pastry"

== After Madison's death ==
Upon Madison's death, he left his remaining slaves to his wife Dolley, asking her only to sell her slaves with their consent. Dolley, however did not follow this prescription, selling the Montpelier plantation and many slaves to pay off the Madisons' debts, including Jennings, who she had planned to emancipate upon her death. After Dolley's death, remaining slaves were given to her son, John Payne Todd, and were not granted emancipation until his death several years later.

== Sources ==
- Broadwater, Jeff. (2012). James Madison: A Son of Virginia and a Founder of a Nation. Chapel Hill, North Carolina: University of North Carolina Press. ISBN 978-0-8078-3530-2.
- Burstein, Andrew; Isenberg, Nancy (2010). Madison and Jefferson. New York, New York: Random House. ISBN 978-1-4000-6728-2.
- Hopkins, Callie (August 28, 2019). "The Enslaved Household of President James Madison". whitehousehistory.org.
- Ketcham, Ralph (2002). "James Madison". In Graff, Henry F. (ed.). The Presidents: A Reference History (Third ed.). New York, New York: Charles Scribner's Sons. pp. 57–70. ISBN 978-0-684-31226-2.
- Watts, Steven (1990). "The Last of the Fathers: James Madison and the Republican Legacy". The American Historical Review. 95 (4): xvii. doi:10.2307/2163682. JSTOR 2163682. Review.
