= Polk Taylor =

Formerly enslaved Methodist minister (1833–1934)

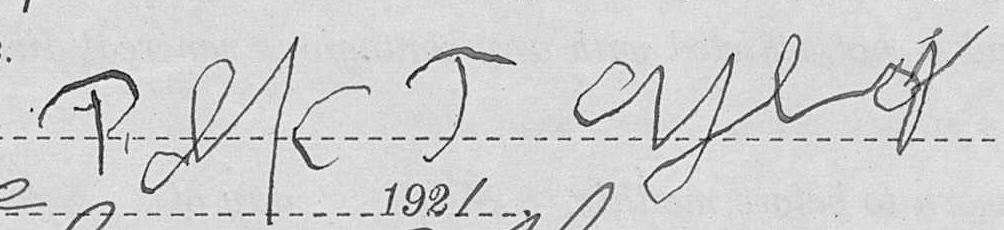
Signature of Polk Taylor in 1921, on the occasion of his remarriage

Reverend Polk Taylor (September 8, 1833 – June 18, 1934) was a formerly enslaved American Methodist minister who was inaccurately reported to have been owned by two former U.S. presidents, James K. Polk and Zachary Taylor. This claim was inaccurate, as he had been the property of Zachary Taylor's daughter Ann Eliza Taylor, and had merely been named after Polk. Ann Eliza later gave Polk Taylor to her niece as a gift. Zachary Taylor had three daughters who survived to adulthood, the oldest was Ann, the youngest was Eliza; it's unclear which one owned Polk Taylor.

Polk Taylor was born 1833 in Brownsville, Tennessee. His father was Tom Alexander, a native of Tennessee; Polk Taylor's mother is recorded in his death certificate as "Phyllis," a native of Africa, and on his second marriage documents she is listed as Phyllis Richard. Polk Taylor was apparently manumitted sometime around 1858 and then studied for the Methodist ministry. A Rev. Polk Taylor of Texas is listed in a directory of contributors to a Baptist missionary fund in 1887. He lived for some time in Colorado, where he seemingly lived and preached in Calhan. His wife and adult son both died in 1913 and services were held for them in Colorado Springs. He moved to Washington state about 1915. On December 30, 1921, at age 83, he remarried to a 42-year-old divorcée named Lizzie Smith Clay. In Washington, he was called "Uncle," tended a vegetable garden at his home, and voted in every election. He died June 18, 1934, of chronic myocarditis at the county home in Yakima, Washington, at age 100.
