= 1971 in the United States =

- Decades: 1950s; 1960s; 1970s; 1980s; 1990s
- See also: History of the United States (1964–1980); Timeline of United States history (1970–1989); List of years in the United States

Events from the year 1971 in the United States.

== Incumbents ==
=== Federal government ===
- President: Richard Nixon (R-California)
- Vice President: Spiro Agnew (R-Maryland)
- Chief Justice: Warren E. Burger (Virginia)
- Speaker of the House of Representatives:

John William McCormack (D-Massachusetts) (until January 3)
Carl Albert (D-Oklahoma) (starting January 21)

- Senate Majority Leader: Mike Mansfield (D-Montana)
- Congress: 91st (until January 3), 92nd (starting January 3)

==== State governments ====
Governors and lieutenant governors

=== Governors ===
- Governor of Alabama: Albert Brewer (Democratic) (until January 18), George Wallace (Democratic) (starting January 18)
- Governor of Alaska: William A. Egan (Democratic)
- Governor of Arizona: Jack Richard Williams (Republican)
- Governor of Arkansas: Winthrop Rockefeller (Republican) (until January 12), Dale Bumpers (Democratic) (starting January 12)
- Governor of California: Ronald Reagan (Republican)
- Governor of Colorado: John Arthur Love (Republican)
- Governor of Connecticut: John N. Dempsey (Democratic) (until January 6), Thomas J. Meskill (Republican) (starting January 6)
- Governor of Delaware: Russell W. Peterson (Republican)
- Governor of Florida: Claude R. Kirk Jr. (Republican) (until January 5), Reubin Askew (Democratic) (starting January 5)
- Governor of Georgia: Lester Maddox (Democratic) (until January 12), Jimmy Carter (Democratic) (starting January 12)
- Governor of Hawaii: John A. Burns (Democratic)
- Governor of Idaho: Don Samuelson (Republican) (until January 4), Cecil D. Andrus (Democratic) (starting January 4)
- Governor of Illinois: Richard B. Ogilvie (Republican)
- Governor of Indiana: Edgar Whitcomb (Republican)
- Governor of Iowa: Robert D. Ray (Republican)
- Governor of Kansas: Robert Docking (Democratic)
- Governor of Kentucky: Louie B. Nunn (Republican) (until December 7), Wendell H. Ford (Democratic) (starting December 7)
- Governor of Louisiana: John J. McKeithen (Democratic)
- Governor of Maine: Kenneth M. Curtis (Democratic)
- Governor of Maryland: Marvin Mandel (Democratic)
- Governor of Massachusetts: Francis W. Sargent (Republican)
- Governor of Michigan: William Milliken (Republican)
- Governor of Minnesota: Harold LeVander (Republican) (until January 4), Wendell R. Anderson (Democratic) (starting January 4)
- Governor of Mississippi: John Bell Williams (Democratic)
- Governor of Missouri: Warren E. Hearnes (Democratic)
- Governor of Montana: Forrest H. Anderson (Democratic)
- Governor of Nebraska: Norbert T. Tiemann (Republican) (until January 7), J. James Exon (Democratic) (starting January 7)
- Governor of Nevada: Paul Laxalt (Republican) (until January 4), Mike O'Callaghan (Democratic) (starting January 4)
- Governor of New Hampshire: Walter R. Peterson Jr. (Republican)
- Governor of New Jersey: William T. Cahill (Republican)
- Governor of New Mexico: David F. Cargo (Republican) (until January 1), Bruce King (Democratic) (starting January 1)
- Governor of New York: Nelson Rockefeller (Republican)
- Governor of North Carolina: Robert W. Scott (Democratic)
- Governor of North Dakota: William L. Guy (Democratic)
- Governor of Ohio: Jim Rhodes (Republican) (until January 11), John J. Gilligan (Democratic) (starting January 11)
- Governor of Oklahoma: Dewey F. Bartlett (Republican) (until January 11), David Hall (Democratic) (starting January 11)
- Governor of Oregon: Tom McCall (Republican)
- Governor of Pennsylvania: Raymond P. Shafer (Republican) (until January 19), Milton Shapp (Democratic) (starting January 19)
- Governor of Rhode Island: Frank Licht (Democratic)
- Governor of South Carolina: Robert Evander McNair (Democratic) (until January 19), John C. West (Democratic) (starting January 19)
- Governor of South Dakota: Frank Farrar (Republican) (until January 5), Richard F. Kneip (Democratic) (starting January 5)
- Governor of Tennessee: Buford Ellington (Democratic) (until January 16), Winfield Dunn (Republican) (starting January 16)
- Governor of Texas: Preston Smith (Democratic)
- Governor of Utah: Cal Rampton (Democratic)
- Governor of Vermont: Deane C. Davis (Republican)
- Governor of Virginia: A. Linwood Holton Jr. (Republican)
- Governor of Washington: Daniel J. Evans (Republican)
- Governor of West Virginia: Arch A. Moore Jr. (Republican)
- Governor of Wisconsin: Warren P. Knowles (Republican) (until January 4), Patrick J. Lucey (Democratic) (starting January 4)
- Governor of Wyoming: Stanley K. Hathaway (Republican)

=== Lieutenant governors ===
- Lieutenant Governor of Alabama: vacant (until January 18), Jere Beasley (Democratic) (starting January 18)
- Lieutenant Governor of Alaska: H. A. Boucher (Democratic)
- Lieutenant Governor of Arkansas: Maurice Britt (Republican) (until January 12), Bob C. Riley (Democratic) (starting January 12)
- Lieutenant Governor of California: Edwin Reinecke (Republican)
- Lieutenant Governor of Colorado: Mark Anthony Hogan (Democratic) (until January 12), John David Vanderhoof (Republican) (starting January 12)
- Lieutenant Governor of Connecticut: Attilio R. Frassinelli (Democratic) (until January 6), T. Clark Hull (Republican) (starting January 6)
- Lieutenant Governor of Delaware: Eugene Bookhammer (Republican)
- Lieutenant Governor of Florida: Ray Osborne (Republican) (until January 5), Thomas Burton Adams Jr. (Democratic) (starting January 5)
- Lieutenant Governor of Georgia: George T. Smith (Democratic) (until January 12), Lester Maddox (Democratic) (starting January 12)
- Lieutenant Governor of Hawaii: George Ariyoshi (Democratic)
- Lieutenant Governor of Idaho: Jack M. Murphy (Democratic)
- Lieutenant Governor of Illinois: Paul Simon (Democratic)
- Lieutenant Governor of Indiana: Richard E. Folz (Republican)
- Lieutenant Governor of Iowa: Roger Jepsen (Republican)
- Lieutenant Governor of Kansas: James H. DeCoursey Jr. (Democratic) (until January 11), Reynolds Shultz (Republican) (starting January 11)
- Lieutenant Governor of Kentucky: Wendell H. Ford (Democratic) (until December 28), Julian Carroll (Democratic) (starting December 28)
- Lieutenant Governor of Louisiana: C. C. Aycock (Democratic)
- Lieutenant Governor of Maryland: vacant (until January 20), Blair Lee III (political party unknown) (starting January 20)
- Lieutenant Governor of Massachusetts: Francis W. Sargent (Republican) (until month and day unknown), Donald R. Dwight (Republican) (starting month and day unknown)
- Lieutenant Governor of Michigan: vacant (until month and day unknown), James H. Brickley (Republican) (starting month and day unknown)
- Lieutenant Governor of Minnesota: James B. Goetz (Republican) (until month and day unknown), Rudy Perpich (Democratic) (starting month and day unknown)
- Lieutenant Governor of Mississippi: Charles L. Sullivan (Democratic)
- Lieutenant Governor of Missouri: William S. Morris (Democratic)
- Lieutenant Governor of Montana: Thomas Lee Judge (Democratic)
- Lieutenant Governor of Nebraska: John Everroad (Republican) (until January 7), Frank Marsh (Republican) (starting January 7)
- Lieutenant Governor of Nevada: Edward Fike (political party unknown) (until January), Harry Reid (Democratic) (starting January)
- Lieutenant Governor of New Mexico: Elias Lee Francis II (Republican) (until January 1), Roberto Mondragón (Democratic) (starting January 1)
- Lieutenant Governor of New York: Malcolm Wilson (Republican)
- Lieutenant Governor of North Carolina: Hoyt Patrick Taylor Jr. (Democratic)
- Lieutenant Governor of North Dakota: Richard F. Larsen (Republican)
- Lieutenant Governor of Ohio: John William Brown (Republican)
- Lieutenant Governor of Oklahoma: George Nigh (Democratic)
- Lieutenant Governor of Pennsylvania: Raymond J. Broderick (Republican) (until January 19), Ernest P. Kline (Democratic) (starting January 19)
- Lieutenant Governor of Rhode Island: J. Joseph Garrahy (Democratic)
- Lieutenant Governor of South Carolina: John C. West (Democratic) (until January 19), Earle Morris Jr. (Democratic) (starting January 19)
- Lieutenant Governor of South Dakota: James Abdnor (Republican) (until January 5), William Dougherty (Democratic) (starting January 5)
- Lieutenant Governor of Tennessee: Frank Gorrell (Democratic) (until January 7), John S. Wilder (Democratic) (starting January 7)
- Lieutenant Governor of Texas: Ben Barnes (Democratic)
- Lieutenant Governor of Vermont: Thomas L. Hayes (Republican) (until month and day unknown), John S. Burgess (Republican) (starting month and day unknown)
- Lieutenant Governor of Virginia:
  - until June 13: J. Sargeant Reynolds (Democratic)
  - June 13-December 4: vacant
  - starting December 4: Henry Howell (Democratic)
- Lieutenant Governor of Washington: John Cherberg (Democratic)
- Lieutenant Governor of Wisconsin: Jack B. Olson (Republican) (until January 4), Martin J. Schreiber (Democratic) (starting January 4)

== Events ==
=== January ===
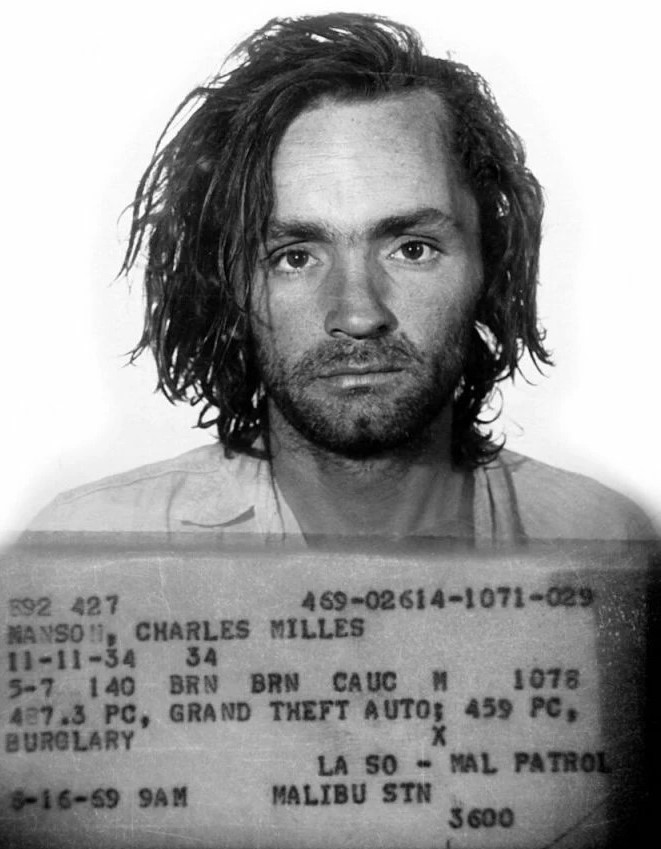
January 25: Charles Manson is found guilty of murder

- January 1 – The Uniform Monday Holiday Act takes effect: Washington's Birthday and several other federal holidays are always observed on certain Mondays, resulting in more three-day weekends for federal employees.
- January 2 – A ban on radio and television cigarette advertisements goes into effect in the United States.
- January 8
  - Voyageurs National Park is established.
  - Gulf Islands National Seashore is established.
- January 12 – The landmark television sitcom All in the Family, starring Carroll O'Connor as Archie Bunker, debuts on CBS.
- January 17 – Super Bowl V: The Baltimore Colts defeat the Dallas Cowboys 16–13 at the Orange Bowl in Miami, Florida.
- January 25 – In Los Angeles, Charles Manson and three female "Family" members are found guilty of the 1969 Tate-LaBianca murders.
- January 28 – An explosion at a federal building in Los Angeles kills 18-year-old employee Tomas Ortiz.
- January 31 – Apollo program: Apollo 14 (carrying astronauts Alan Shepard, Stuart Roosa, and Edgar Mitchell) lifts off on the third successful lunar landing mission.

=== February ===
- February 9
  - The 6.5–6.7 M_{w} Sylmar earthquake hits the Greater Los Angeles Area with a maximum Mercalli intensity of XI (Extreme), killing 58–65 and injuring 200–2,000.
  - Apollo program: Apollo 14 returns to Earth after the third crewed Moon landing.
  - Satchel Paige becomes the first Negro league player to become voted into the Baseball Hall of Fame.
- February 11 – The U.S., United Kingdom, and the USSR (along with others) sign the Seabed Treaty, outlawing nuclear weapons on the ocean floor.
- February 20
  - The Mississippi Delta tornado outbreak leaves 123 dead and more than 1,592 injured.
  - The U.S. Emergency Broadcast System sends an erroneous warning; many radio stations ignore it.

=== March ===
- March 1 – A bomb explodes in the men's room at the U.S. Capitol; the Weather Underground organization claims responsibility.
- March 8 – Boxer Joe Frazier defeats Muhammad Ali in a 15-round unanimous decision at Madison Square Garden.
- March 24 – Congress discontinues funding for supersonic transport (SST); primary contractor was Boeing.
- March 29
  - U.S. Army Lieutenant William Calley is found guilty of 22 murders in the My Lai massacre and sentenced to life in prison. After intervention from President Nixon, he is released in 1974.
  - A Los Angeles jury recommends the death penalty for Charles Manson and three female followers.
- March 30 – The first Starbucks coffee shop opens, in Pike Place Market, Elliott Bay, Seattle.

=== April ===
- April 1 – Pipe bomb explodes in a bathroom at Los Angeles City Hall; Chicano Liberation Front later claims responsibility.
- April 9 – Charles Manson is sentenced to death; in 1972, the sentence for all California death row inmates is commuted to life imprisonment (see Furman v. Georgia).
- April 10 – Veterans Stadium in Philadelphia opens.
- April 15 – The 43rd Academy Awards ceremony, hosted by 34 various "Friends of Oscar", is held at Dorothy Chandler Pavilion in Los Angeles. Franklin J. Schaffner's Patton wins seven awards, including Best Picture and Best Director for Schaffner. The film is also tied with George Seaton's Airport in receiving ten nominations. George C. Scott becomes the first actor to reject an Oscar, declining his Best Actor win.
- April 19 – The Doors release their sixth and final studio album with frontman Jim Morrison, L.A. Woman, before Morrison moves to Paris.
- April 20
  - Swann v. Charlotte-Mecklenburg Board of Education: The Supreme Court of the United States rules unanimously that busing of students may be ordered to achieve racial desegregation.
  - National Public Radio goes live.
- April 24 – Five hundred thousand people in Washington, D.C., and 125,000 in San Francisco march in protest against the Vietnam War.
- April 30 – The Milwaukee Bucks win the championship of the National Basketball Association in just their third season, completing a four-game sweep of the Baltimore Bullets in the finals.

=== May ===
- May 1 – Amtrak begins inter-city rail passenger service in the United States.
- May 3
  - A Harris Poll claims that 60% of Americans are against the Vietnam War.
  - Anti-war activists attempt to disrupt government business in Washington, D.C.; police and military units arrest as many as 12,000, most of whom are later released.
- May 5 – The US dollar floods the European currency markets and threatens especially the Deutsche Mark; the central banks of Austria, Belgium, Netherlands and Switzerland stop the currency trading.
- May 9 – Mariner 8 fails to launch.
- May 29 – Al Unser wins the Indianapolis 500 in the Vel's Parnelli Jones Special Colt-Ford.
- May 30 – Mariner program: Mariner 9 is launched toward Mars.

=== June ===
- June – Massachusetts passes its Chapter 766 laws enacting Special Education.
- June 1 – Vietnam War: Vietnam Veterans for a Just Peace, claiming to represent the majority of U.S. veterans who served in Southeast Asia, speak against war protests.
- June 6 – A midair collision between Hughes Airwest Flight 706 Douglas DC-9 jetliner and a U.S. Marine Corps McDonnell Douglas F-4 Phantom jet fighter near Duarte, California, claims 50 lives.
- June 10 – The U.S. ends its trade embargo of China.
- June 13 – Vietnam War: The New York Times begins to publish the Pentagon Papers.
- June 17 – Representatives of Japan and the United States sign the Okinawa Reversion Agreement, whereby the U.S. will return control of Okinawa.
- June 18 – Southwest Airlines, the most successful low cost carrier in history, begins its first flights between Dallas, Houston and San Antonio.
- June 25 – Madagascar accuses the U.S. of being connected to the plot to oust the current government; the U.S. recalls its ambassador.
- June 27
  - Concert promoter Bill Graham closes the legendary Fillmore East, which first opened on 2nd Avenue (between 5th and 6th Streets) in New York City on March 8, 1968.
  - WTVP (PBS) first airs in Peoria, Illinois.
- June 28
  - Assassin Jerome A. Johnson shoots Joe Colombo in the head in the middle of an Italian-American rally, putting him in a coma and paralyzing him. He dies seven years later as a result of his injuries.
  - Lemon v. Kurtzman: The Supreme Court of the U.S. rules in a landmark case on the Establishment Clause.
- June 30 – New York Times Co. v. United States: The Supreme Court of the U.S. rules that the Pentagon Papers may be published, rejecting government injunctions as unconstitutional prior restraint.

=== July ===
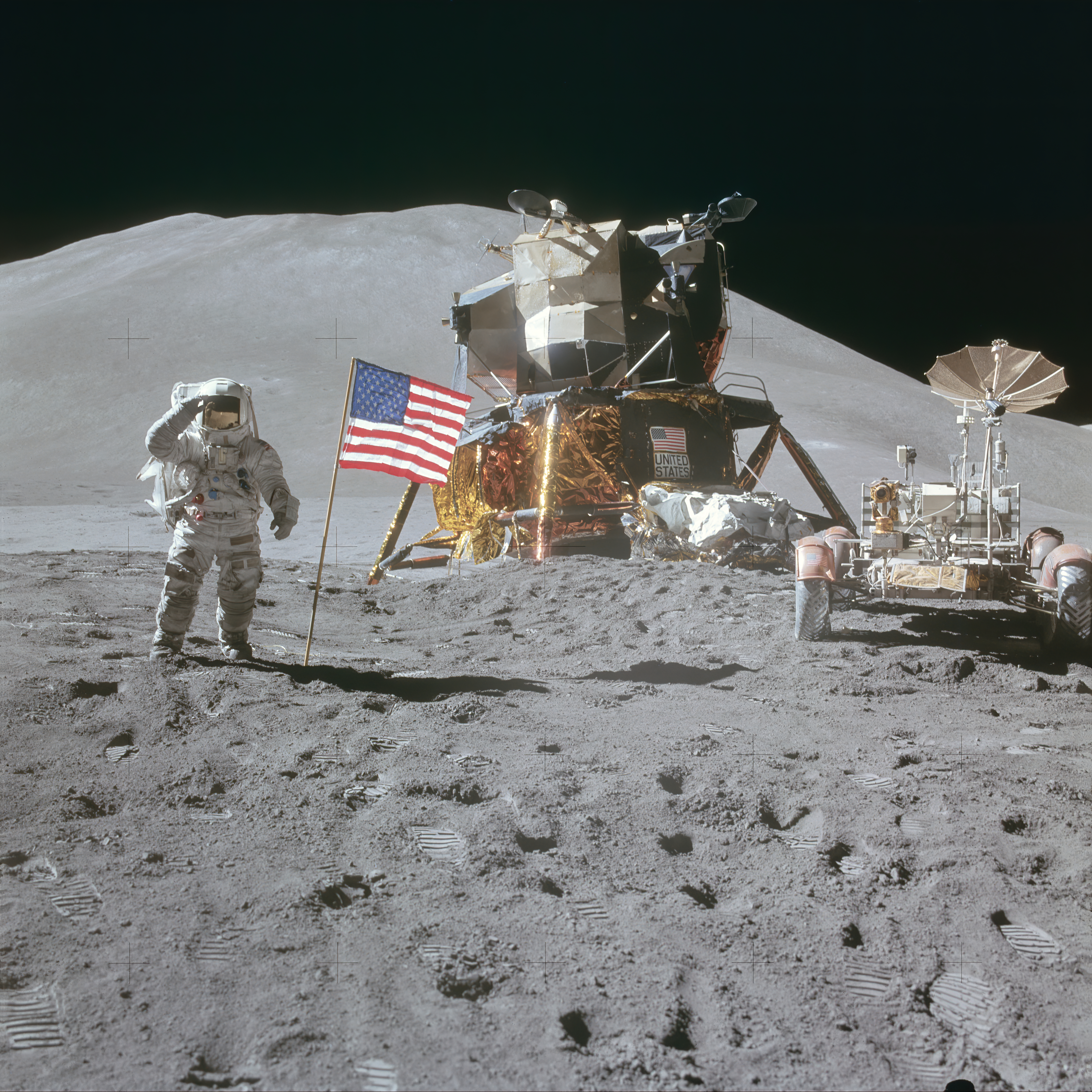
July 26–August 7: Apollo 15

- July 1 – The Postal Reorganization Act goes into effect, replacing the Cabinet-level Post Office Department with the United States Postal Service.
- July 3 – Jim Morrison, lead singer and lyricist of The Doors, is found dead in his bathtub in Paris, France.
- July 5 – Right to vote: The Twenty-sixth Amendment to the United States Constitution is formally certified by President Richard Nixon, lowering the voting age from 21 to 18.
- July 19 – The South Tower of the World Trade Center is topped out at 1,362 feet (415 m), making it the second tallest building in the world.
- July 26 – Apollo 15 (carrying astronauts David Scott, Alfred Worden, and James Irwin) is launched.
- July 31 – Apollo 15 astronauts David Scott and James Irwin become the first to ride in a lunar rover, a day after landing on the Moon.

=== August ===
- August – The unemployment rate peaks at 6.1%.
- August 1 – In New York City, 40,000 people attend the Concert for Bangladesh.
- August 7 – Apollo 15 returns to Earth.
- August 11 – Construction begins on the Louisiana Superdome in New Orleans.
- August 15 – President Richard Nixon announces that the United States will no longer convert dollars to gold at a fixed value, effectively ending the Bretton Woods system. He also imposes a 90-day freeze on wages, prices and rents.
- August 20 – The USS Manatee (AO-58) spills 1,000 US gallons (3,800 L) of fuel oil on President Nixon's Western White House beach in San Clemente, California.

=== September ===
- September 4 – A Boeing 727 (Alaska Airlines Flight 1866) crashes into the side of a mountain near Juneau, Alaska, killing all 111 people on board.
- September 8 – In Washington, D.C., the John F. Kennedy Center for the Performing Arts is inaugurated, with the opening feature being the premiere of Leonard Bernstein's Mass.
- September 9–13 – Attica Prison riots: A revolt breaks out at the maximum-security prison in Attica, New York. In the end, state police and the United States National Guard storm the facility; 42 are killed, 10 of them hostages.
- September 22 – Ernest Medina is cleared of all charges connected with the My Lai massacre.
- September 28 – Cardinal József Mindszenty, who had taken refuge in the U.S. Embassy in Budapest since 1956, is allowed to leave Hungary.
- September 30 – Unruly fans storm the field at Robert F. Kennedy Memorial Stadium during the final game for the second incarnation of the Washington Senators, who will move to Arlington, Texas, prior to the next season and become the Texas Rangers. The Senators, leading the New York Yankees 7–5 with two out in the ninth inning when fans invade the diamond, are forced to forfeit.

=== October ===
- October 1 – Walt Disney World opens in Orlando, Florida.
- October 17 – The Pittsburgh Pirates defeat the Baltimore Orioles, 4 games to 3, to win their fourth World Series title.
- October 18 – In New York City, the Knapp Commission begins public hearings on police corruption.
- October 21 – U.S. President Richard Nixon nominates Lewis Franklin Powell Jr. and William H. Rehnquist to the U.S. Supreme Court.
- October 23 – Texas Christian University football coach Jim Pittman collapses on the sideline and dies from a massive heart attack while coaching the Horned Frogs during a game against Southwest Conference rival Baylor in Waco, Texas.
- October 24 – Detroit Lions wide receiver Chuck Hughes collapses and dies of a heart attack near the end of a game against the Chicago Bears in Detroit.
- October 29 – Vietnam War: Vietnamization: The total number of American troops in Vietnam drops to a record low of 196,700 (the lowest since January 1966).

=== November ===
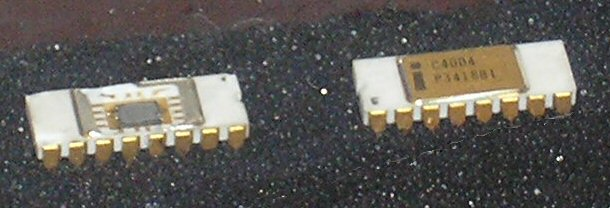
November 15: The Intel 4004, the first commercially available microprocessor, is released

- November 6 – Operation Grommet: The U.S. tests a thermonuclear warhead at Amchitka Island in Alaska, code-named Project Cannikin. At around 5 megatons, it is the largest ever U.S. underground detonation.
- November 12
  - Vietnam War: Vietnamization: U.S. President Richard Nixon sets February 1, 1972, as the deadline for the removal of another 45,000 American troops from Vietnam.
  - Arches National Park is established.
- November 13 – Mariner program: Mariner 9 becomes the first spacecraft to enter Mars orbit successfully.
- November 15 – Intel releases the world's first commercially available microprocessor, the Intel 4004.
- November 24 – During a severe thunderstorm over Washington, a man calling himself D. B. Cooper parachutes from the Northwest Orient Airlines plane he hijacked, with US$200,000 in ransom money, and is never seen again.

=== December ===
- December 8 – U.S. President Richard Nixon orders the 7th Fleet to move towards the Bay of Bengal in the Indian Ocean.
- December 10
  - The John Sinclair Freedom Rally in support of the imprisoned activist features a performance by John Lennon at Crisler Arena in Ann Arbor, Michigan.
  - George Lucas founds Lucasfilm.
- December 11
  - The Libertarian Party (United States) is established.
  - An explosion in a water tunnel beneath Lake Huron in Port Huron, Michigan, kills 22.
- December 18
  - The U.S. dollar is devalued for the second time in history.
  - Capitol Reef National Park is established.
- December 21 – In Cleveland Ohio, an African-American man named Tyrone Howard, the father of actor Terrence Howard, stabs and kills a White man named Jack Fitzpatrick during a dispute while waiting in line to meet Santa with their respective families. The incident received nationwide coverage and attention.
- December 22 – KUAC-TV in Fairbanks, Alaska, launches, becoming the 49th state's first public television station.
- December 23 – Rudolph The Red Nosed Reindeer airs for the last time on NBC, as KENI-TV (now KTUU-TV) in Anchorage, Alaska, KFAR-TV (now KATN, current ABC affiliate) in Fairbanks Alaska, KHON-TV (current Fox affiliate) in Honolulu, Hawaii, and KUAM-TV in Guam air the special in prime time. It will move to CBS a year later and would return to NBC in 2024.
- December 25 – In the longest game in NFL history, the Miami Dolphins beat the Kansas City Chiefs 27–24 after 22 minutes, 40 seconds of sudden death overtime.

=== Undated ===
- Crude oil production peaks in the continental United States at approximately 4.5 million barrels per day (720,000 m^{3}/d).

=== Ongoing ===
- Cold War (1947–1991)
- Space Race (1957–1975)
- Vietnam War, U.S. involvement (1964–1973)
- Détente (c. 1969–1979)

== Births ==
=== January ===
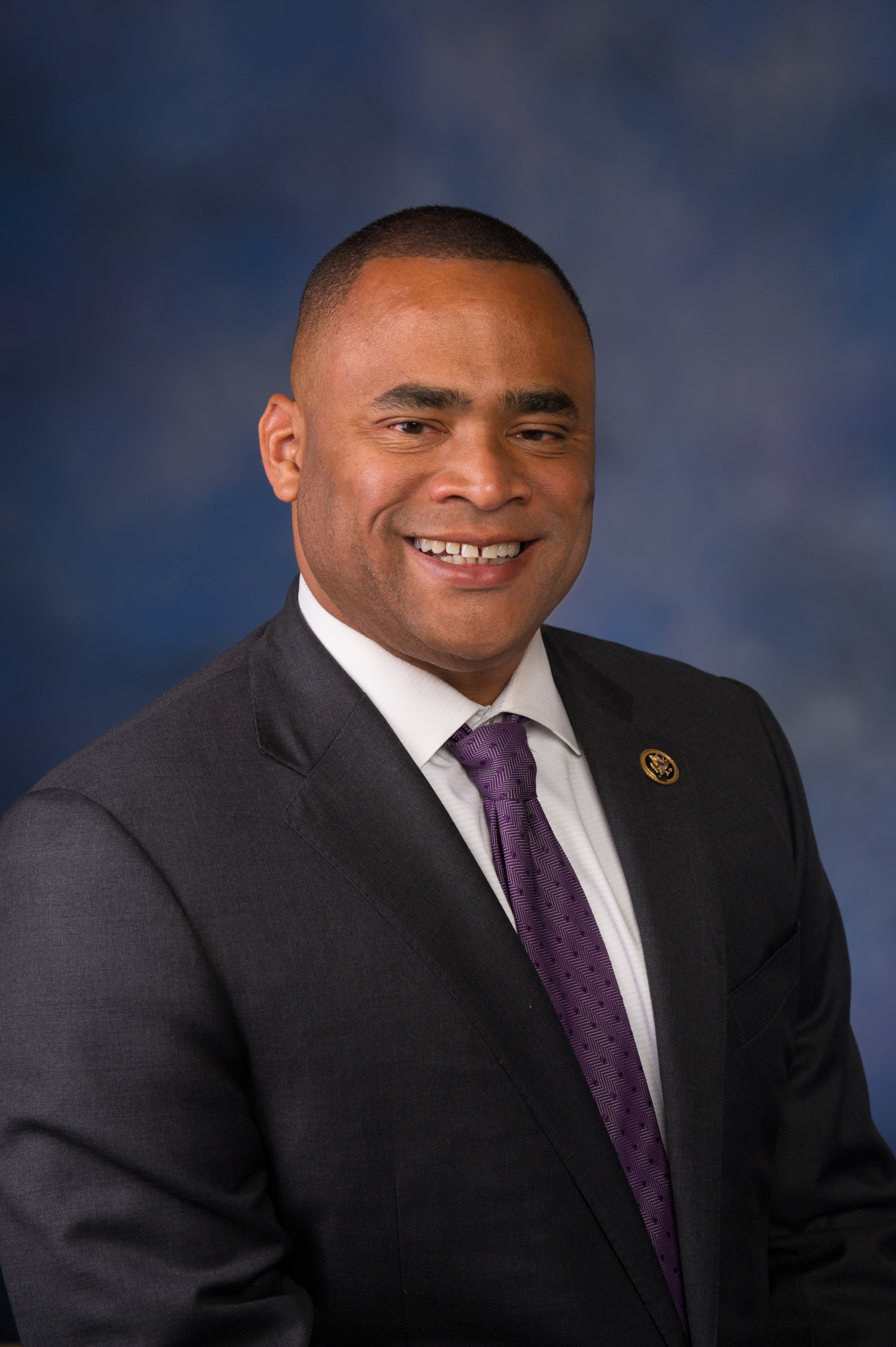
Marc Veasey

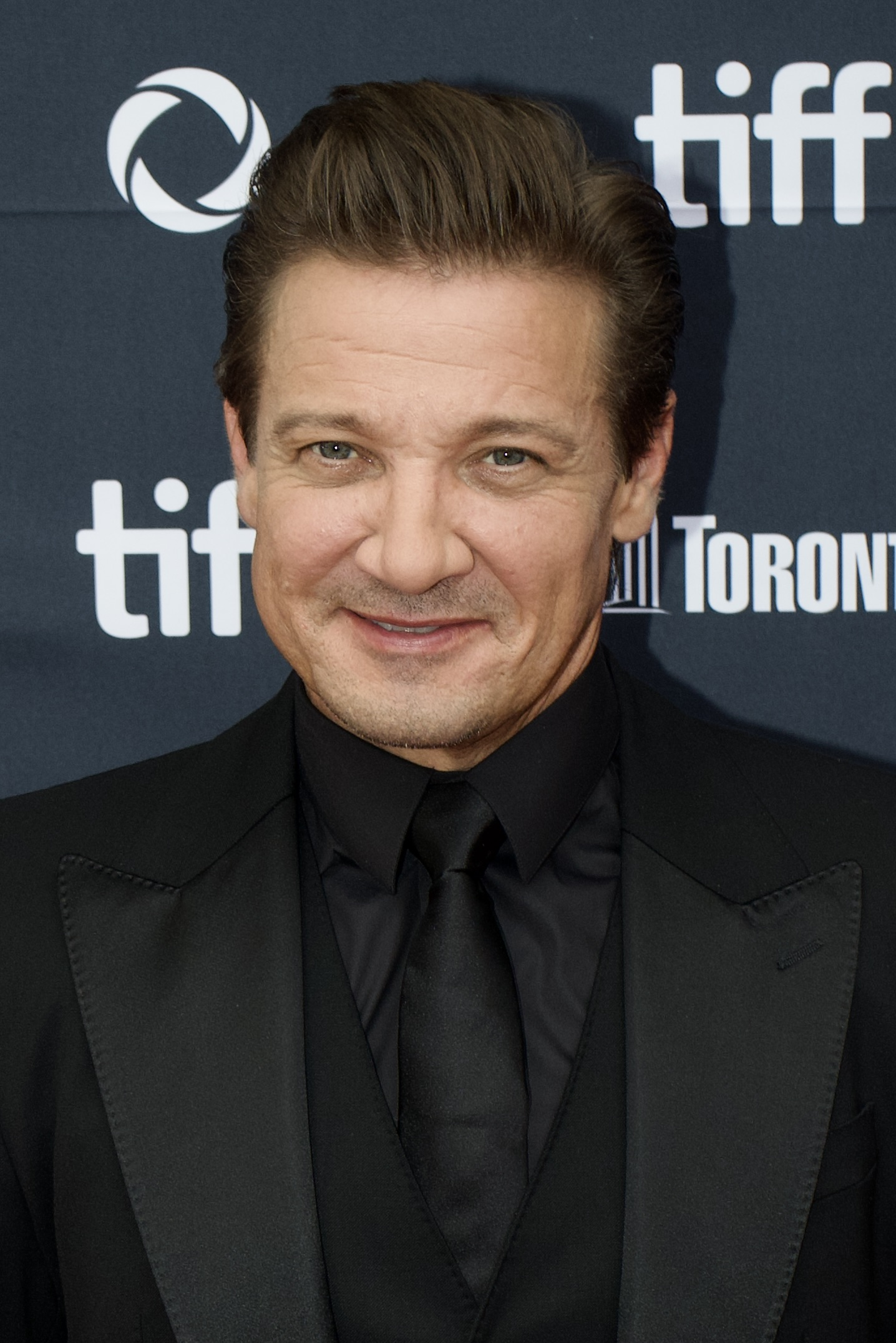
Jeremy Renner

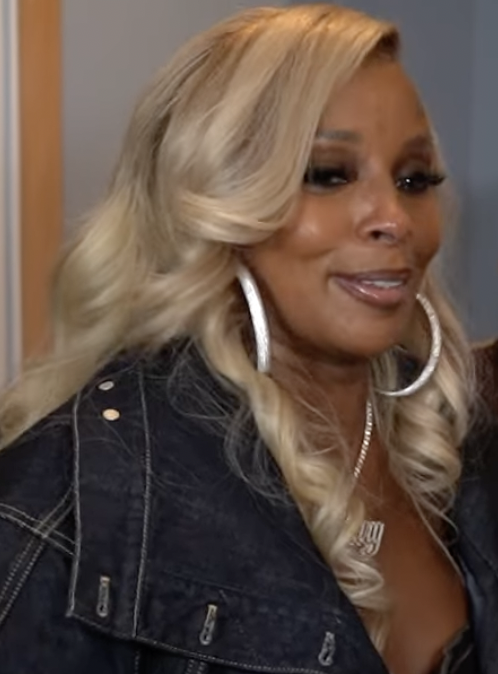
Mary J. Blige

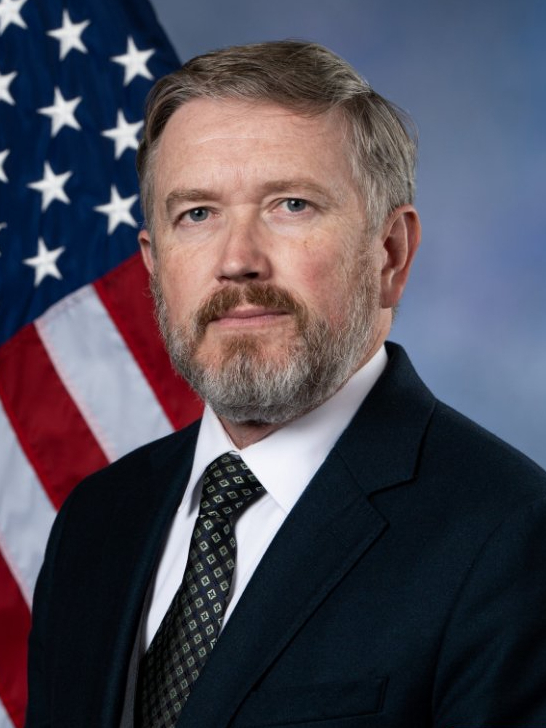
Thomas Massie

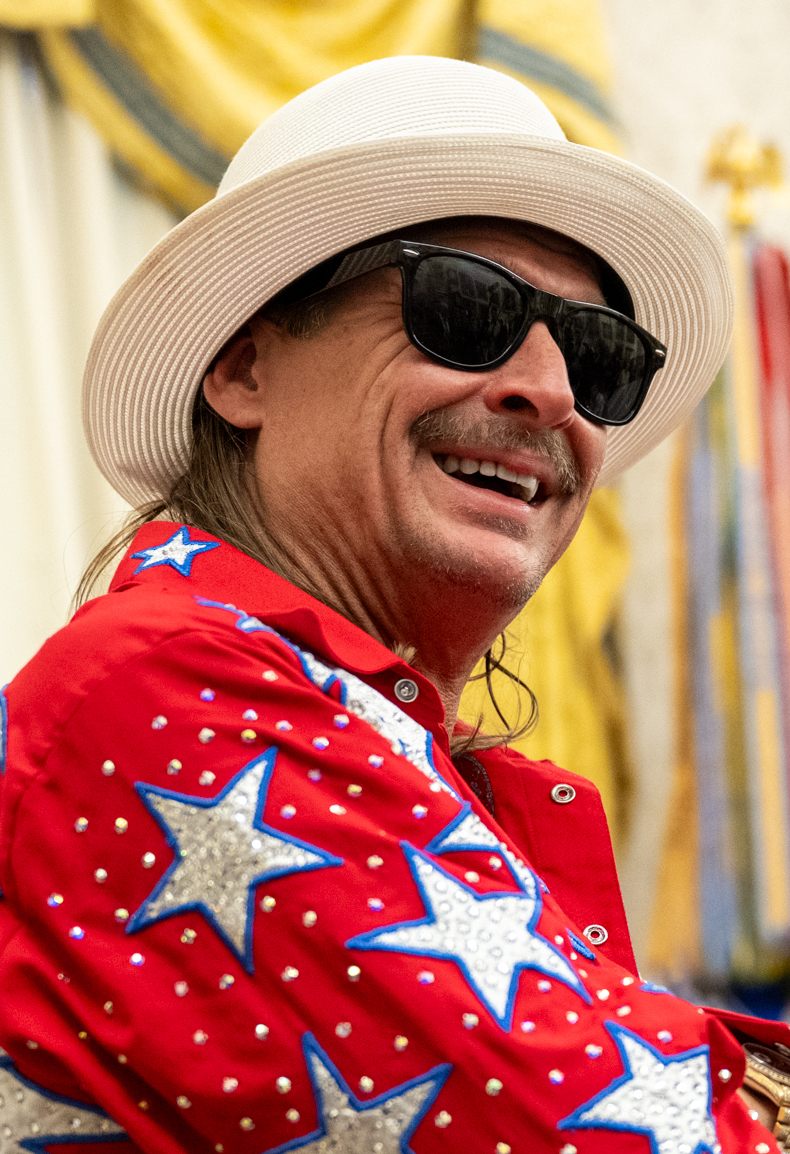
Kid Rock

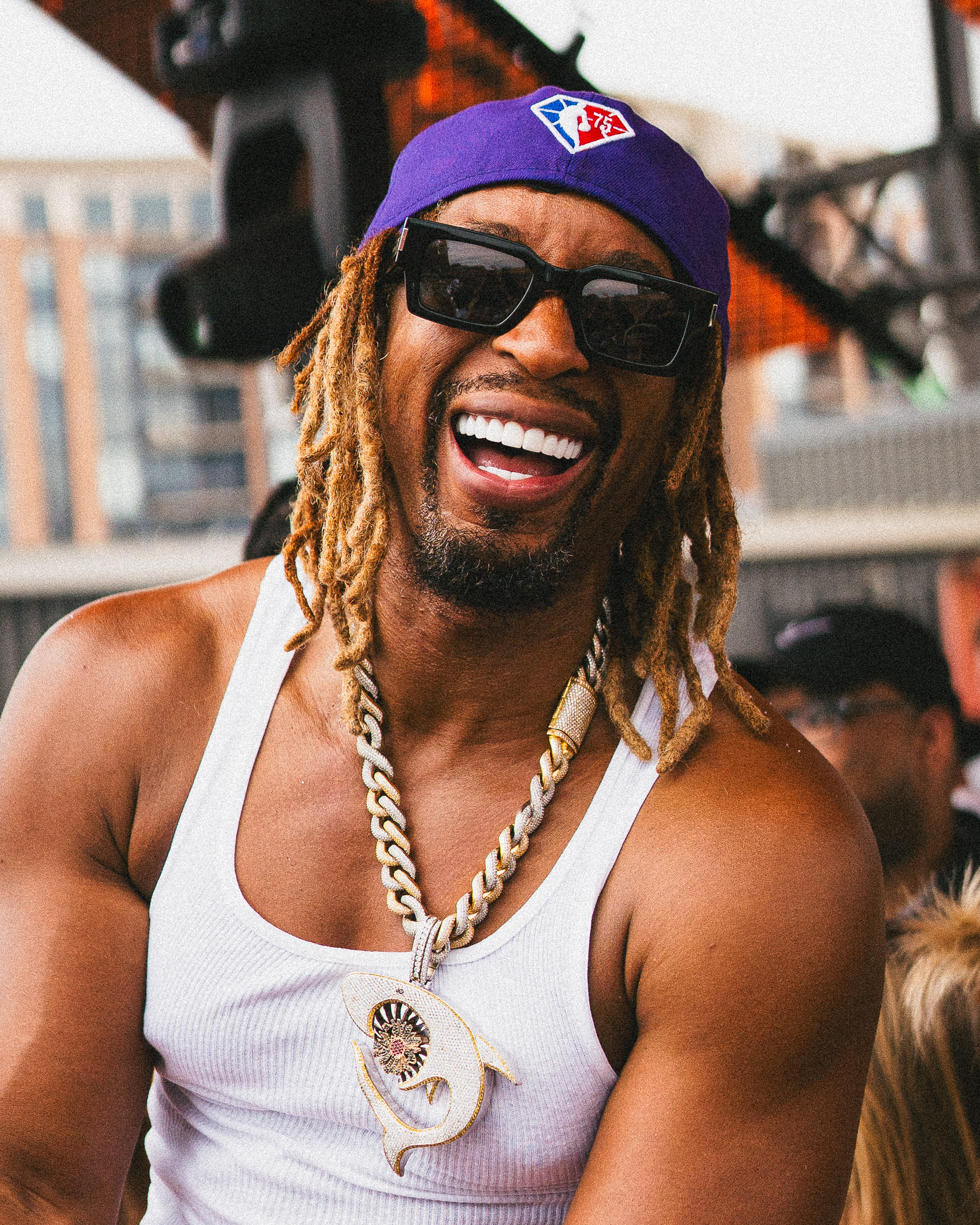
Lil Jon

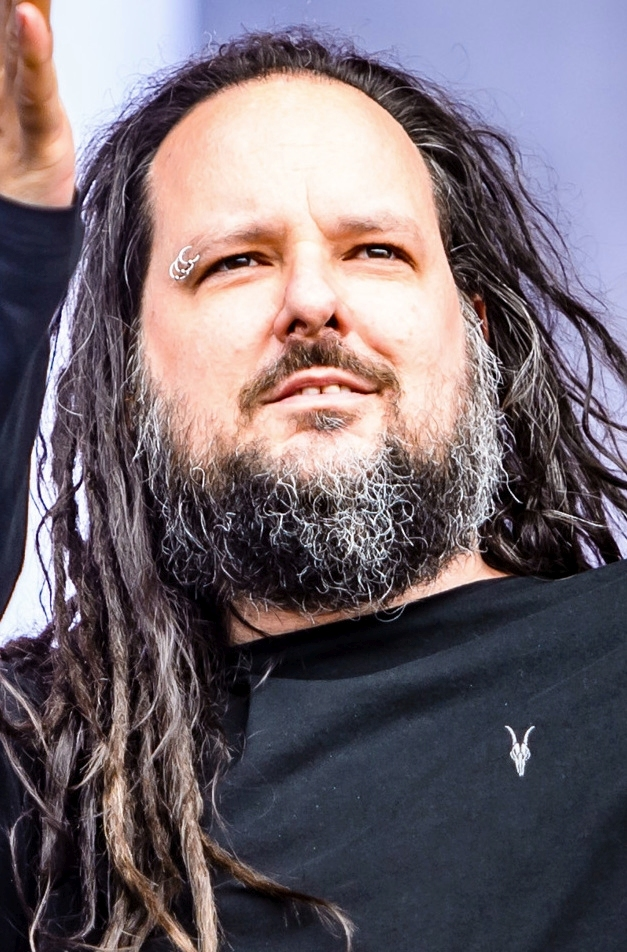
Jonathan Davis

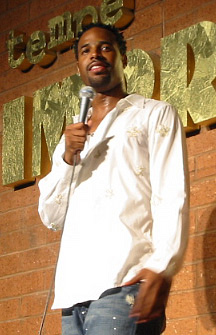
Shawn Wayans

- January 1
  - Alicia Berneche, opera soprano
  - Beno Bryant, football player
  - Sammie Henson, wrestler
  - Bridget Pettis, basketball player
  - Denise Stapley, sex therapist and former game show contestant, winner of Survivor: Philippines
- January 2
  - Taye Diggs, actor
  - Renée Elise Goldsberry, actress
  - Lisa Harrison, basketball player
- January 3 – Marc Veasey, politician
- January 5
  - Jason Bates, baseball player
  - Hillary Butler, football player
- January 6
  - Kristi Addis, actress, journalism, athlete, and beauty queen, Miss Teen USA 1987
  - Myron Baker, football player
- January 7
  - C. W. Anderson, wrestler
  - J. D. Barker, author
  - Kevin Rahm, actor
  - Jeremy Renner, actor
- January 8
  - Ben Byer, actor and playwright
  - Jason Giambi, baseball player
- January 9
  - John Ballato, materials scientist, entrepreneur, and academic
  - Angie Martinez, radio host
- January 10 – Kris Bruton, basketball player
- January 11 – Mary J. Blige, singer
- January 12
  - Scott Burrell, basketball player and coach
  - Andy Fox, baseball player and coach
- January 13
  - John Asher, actor and filmmaker
  - Thomas Massie, politician
- January 14 – Andrew Brenner, politician
- January 15 – Regina King, actress
- January 16 – Junior Bryant, football player
- January 17
  - Jalal Alamgir, Bangladeshi-born academic and university professor (d. 2011)
  - John Bergsma, University professor
  - Brother J, hip hop artist
  - Kid Rock, rock singer
  - Lil Jon, rapper
  - Herneitha Rochelle Hardaway, conservative commentator
- January 18
  - Amy Barger, astronomer
  - Norm Bazin, ice hockey player and coach
  - Jonathan Davis, musician and frontman for Korn
  - Debbie Mucarsel-Powell, politician
- January 19
  - Reggie Brooks, football player
  - Shawn Wayans, actor, writer, and producer
  - John Wozniak, singer and guitarist, frontman for Marcy Playground
- January 20
  - Brian Giles, baseball player
  - Derrick Green, singer/songwriter
  - Questlove, drummer, DJ, and producer
- January 22 – Bucky Brooks, football player and sportswriter
- January 23
  - Diana Barrows, actress, singer, and dancer
  - Julie Foudy, soccer player and commentator
  - Kevin Mawae, football player and coach
  - Marc Nelson, singer/songwriter
- January 24
  - Cory Bailey, baseball player
  - Kenya Moore, actress and model
- January 25
  - Maya Arad, Israeli-born writer
  - Vincent Brisby, football player
- January 26 – Keirda Bahruth, filmmaker
- January 27 – Clint Baker, jazz musician
- January 30
  - Derek Allen, football player
  - Lizzie Grubman, publicist
  - Kimo von Oelhoffen, football player
- January 31 – J. P. Boulee, judge

=== February ===
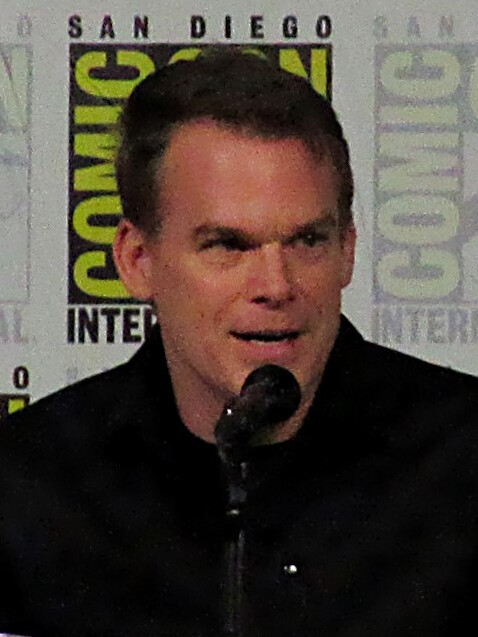
Michael C. Hall

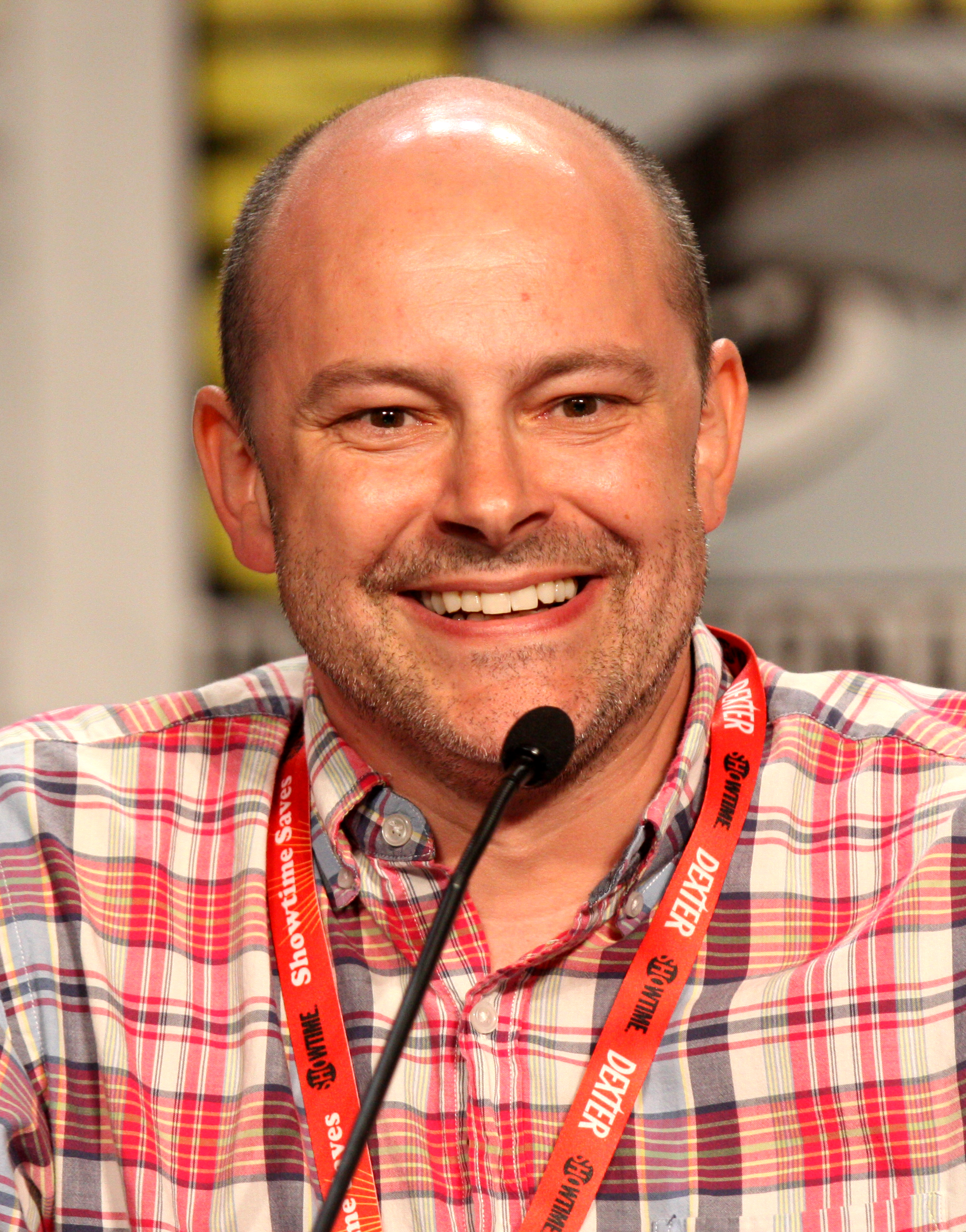
Rob Corddry

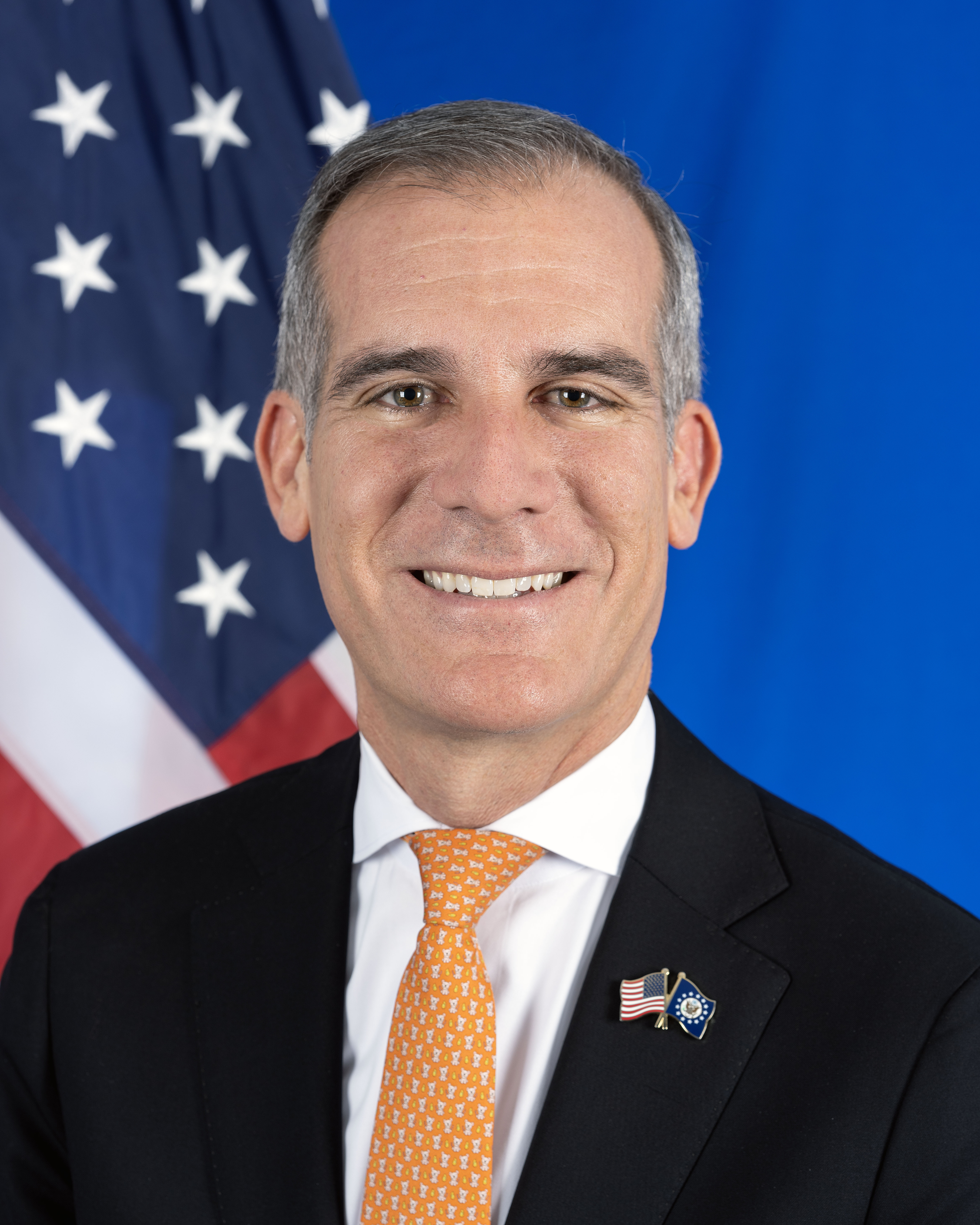
Eric Garcetti

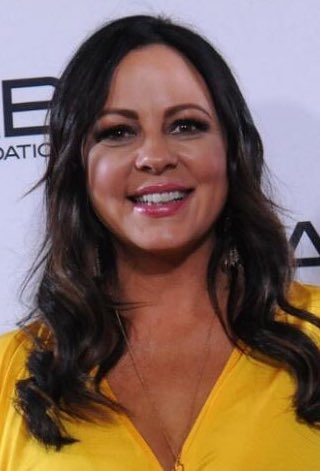
Sara Evans

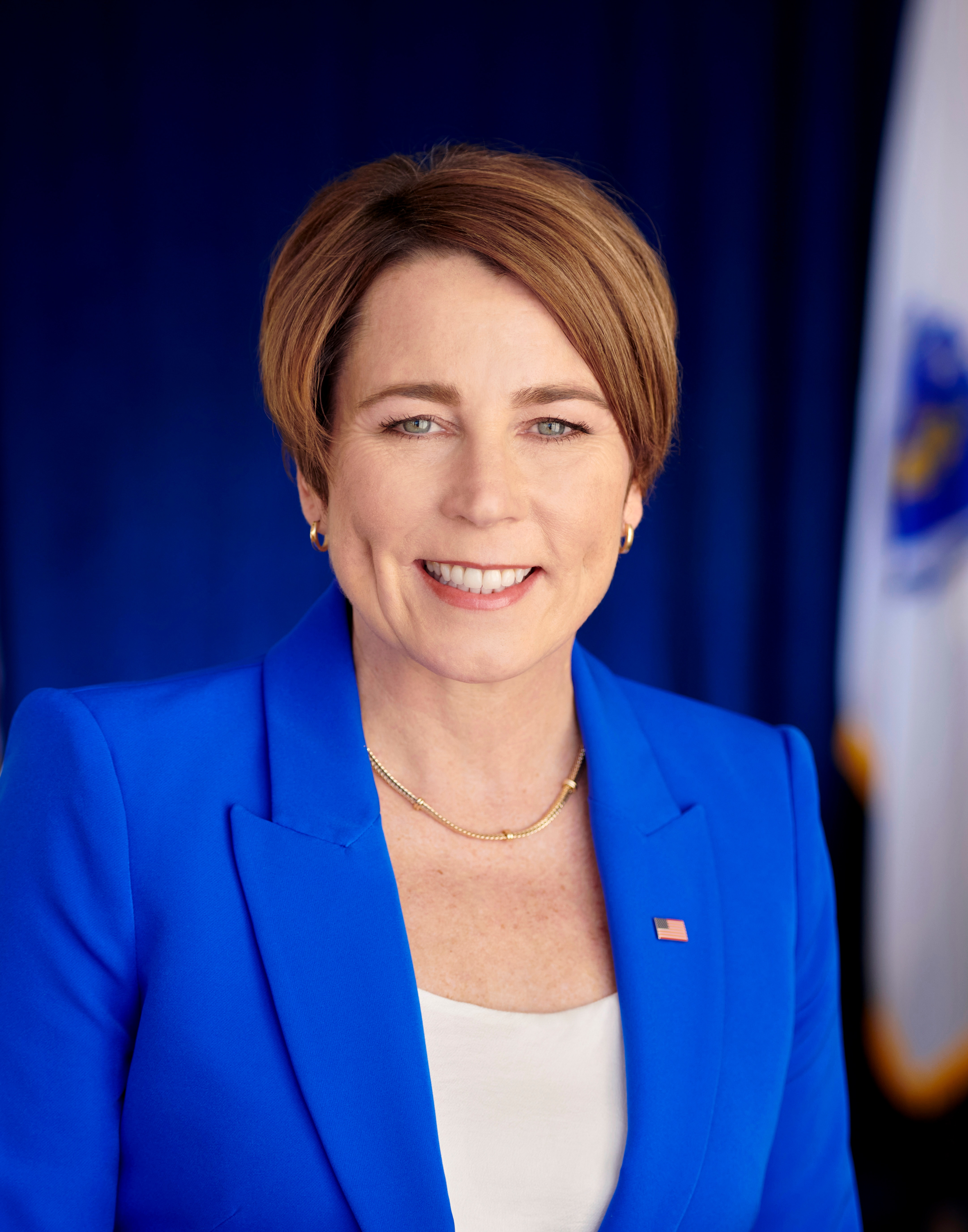
Maura Healey

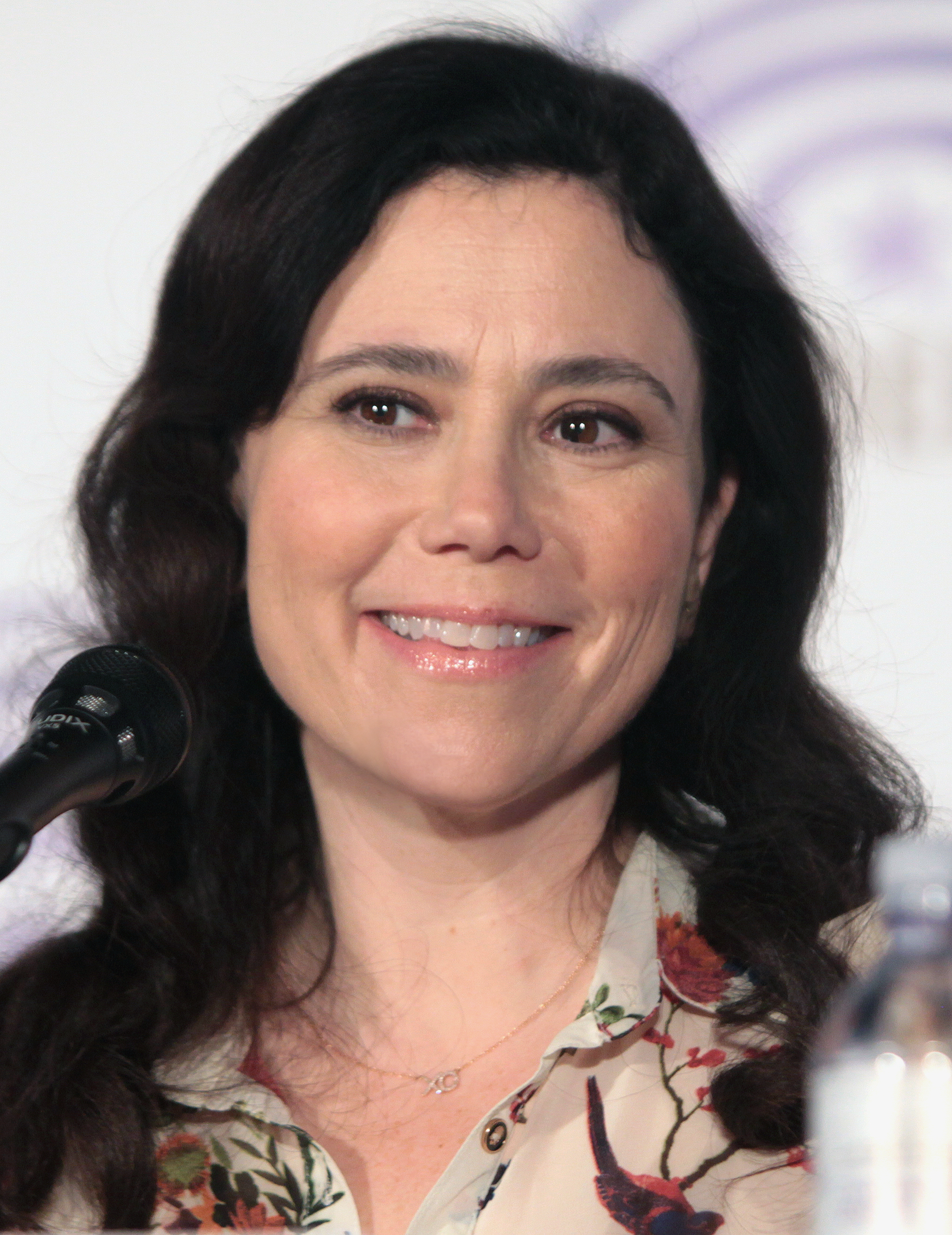
Alex Borstein

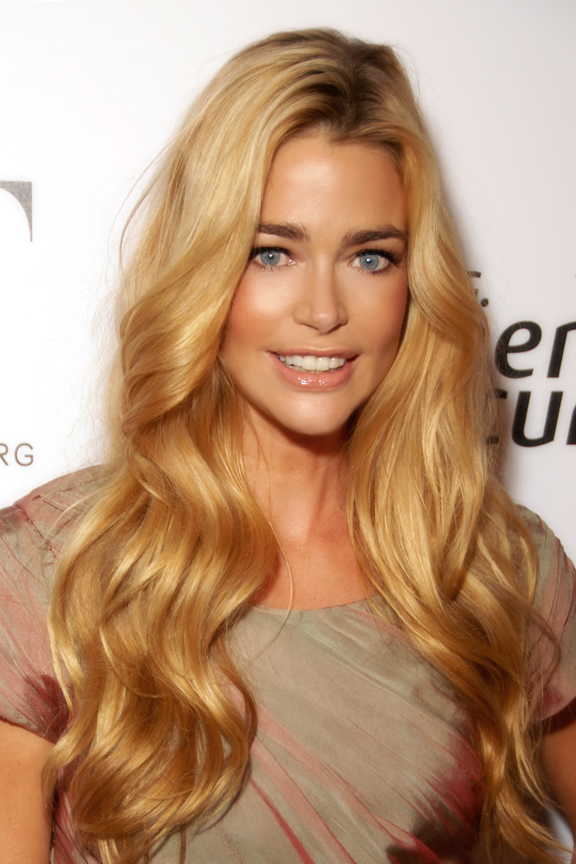
Denise Richards

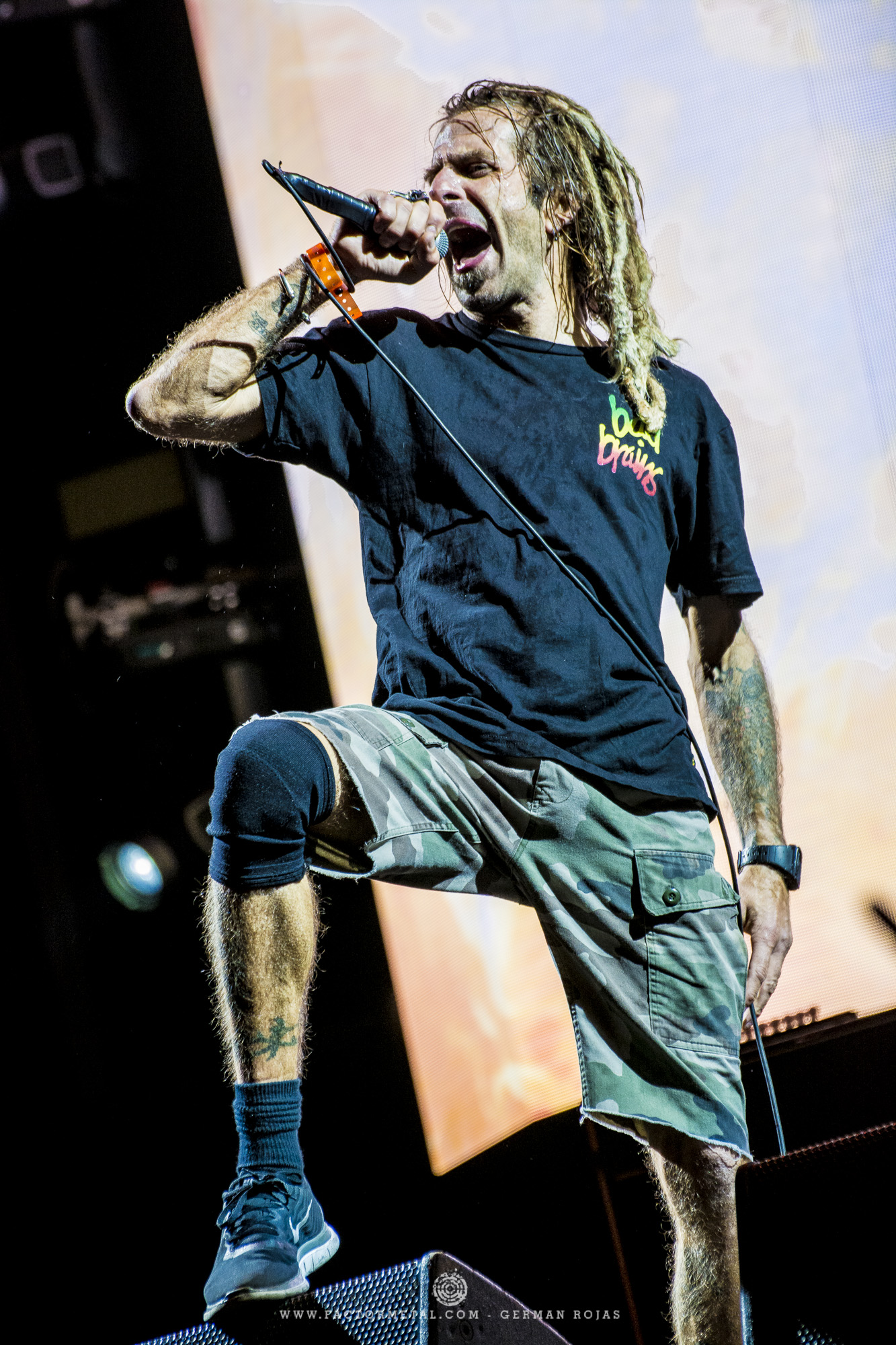
Randy Blythe

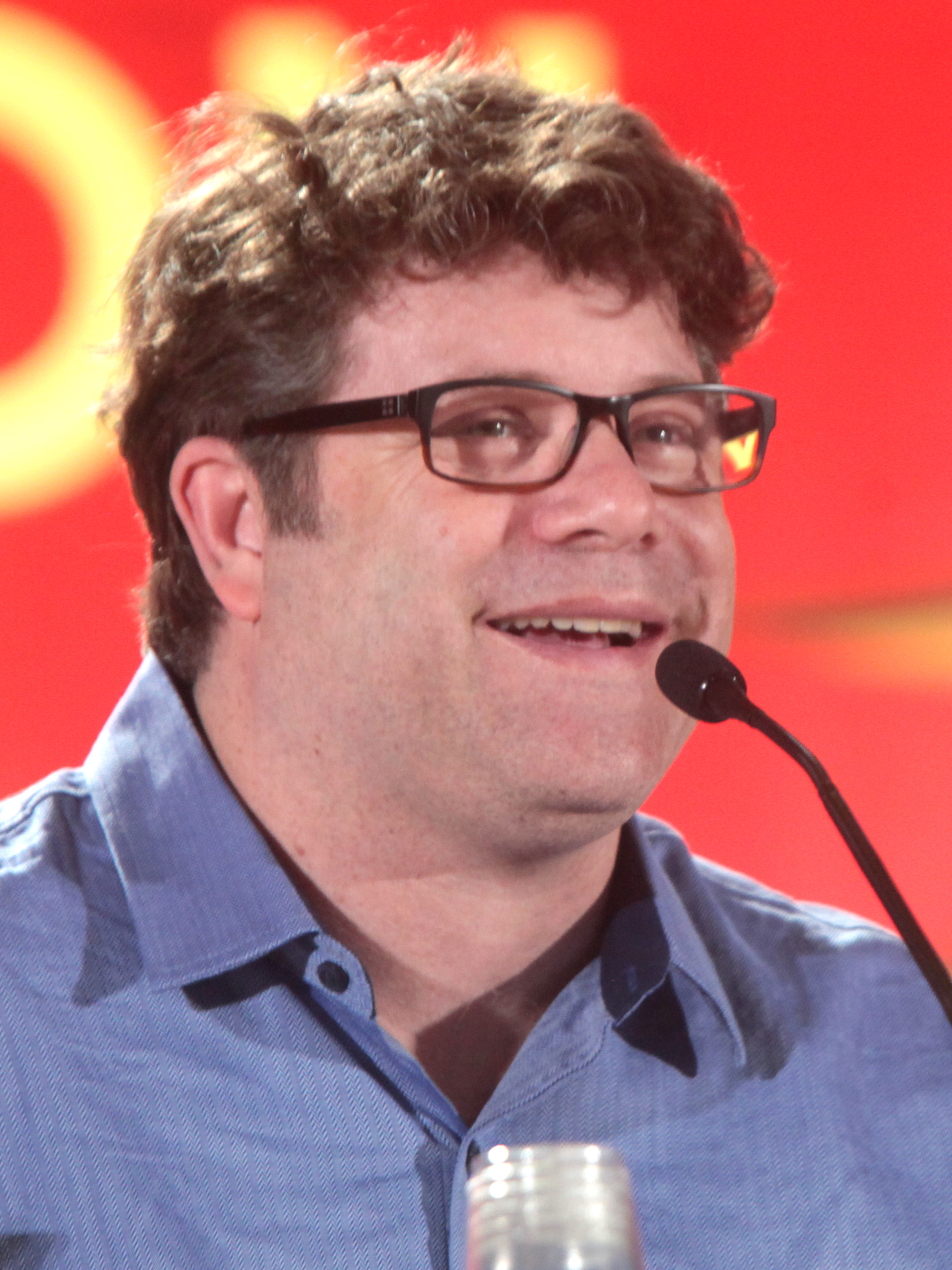
Sean Astin

- February 1
  - Israel Byrd, football player
  - Rebecca Creskoff, actress
  - Michael C. Hall, actor
  - Jill Kelly, pornographic actress
  - Hynden Walch, actress
- February 2
  - Brad Alexander, composer
  - Ted Alford, football player
  - Jase Bolger, politician
  - Kevin Symons, actor
- February 3
  - Marcus Buckley, football player
  - Sean Dawkins, football player (d. 2023)
- February 4
  - Rob Corddry, actor and comedian
  - Eric Garcetti, politician, 42nd mayor of Los Angeles
  - Michael A. Goorjian, actor, director, producer, and screenwriter
- February 5
  - Dan Amrich, writer, author, actor, musician, and social media expert
  - Janine Boyd, politician
  - Sara Evans, country singer
- February 6
  - Lance Bade, Olympic target shooter
  - Brian Stepanek, actor
- February 8
  - Mike Ammann, soccer player
  - Gretchen J. Berg, writer and producer
  - Maura Healey, politician, 73rd Governor of Massachusetts
- February 9
  - Timothy Archambault, flutist, architect, and composer
  - Sharon Case, model and actress
- February 10
  - Sherry Block, Olympic archer
  - Chuck Butler, Christian music producer, songwriter and composer
  - Jon Button, bassist
  - Lisa Marie Varon, wrestler
  - Annie Wood, actress, writer, and television personality
- February 11 – John Bock, football player
- February 12
  - Romeo Bandison, football player
  - Gil Cisneros, politician
  - Scott Menville, actor and voice actor
- February 13
  - Rochelle Ballard, surfer
  - Matt Berninger, singer/songwriter and frontman for The National
  - Tommy Dreamer, wrestler
- February 14 – Viscera, wrestler (d. 2014)
- February 15
  - Alex Borstein, actress, voice artist, producer, and screenwriter
  - Jim Butler, Olympic table tennis player
  - Renee O'Connor, actress
- February 16
  - Michael Avenatti, attorney and convicted criminal
  - Zac Baird, keyboardist
  - Ian Boyden, artist
  - Dan Green, voice actor and voice director
  - Jack Rose, guitarist (d. 2009)
- February 17 – Denise Richards, actress
- February 18 – Hiep Thi Le, Vietnamese-born actress and restaurateur (d. 2017)
- February 19
  - Gil Shaham, violinist
  - Jeff Kinney, author and cartoonist
- February 20
  - Calpernia Addams, actress, author, and activist
  - Brian Bohannon, football player and coach
- February 21 – Randy Blythe, heavy metal singer and frontman for Lamb of God
- February 22
  - Gilbert Brown, football player
  - Lisa Fernandez, softball player
  - Max Lane, football player
  - Lea Salonga, singer and Broadway actress
- February 23 – Angela Alsobrooks, lawyer and politician
- February 24
  - Josh Bernstein, anthropologist, explorer, and author
  - Gillian Flynn, author, comic book writer, and screenwriter
- February 25 – Sean Astin, actor
- February 26
  - Erykah Badu, singer/songwriter and record producer
  - Sean Baker, filmmaker
  - Patricia D. Barksdale, lawyer and judge
- February 27
  - Anthony Adams, politician
  - Charles Baker, actor, writer, and director
  - Sara Blakely, businesswoman and philanthropist
  - Rozonda Thomas, singer
- February 28
  - Maxine Bahns, actress, triathlete, and model
  - Peter Beinart, columnist, journalist, and political commentator
  - Amanda Davis, writer and teacher (d. 2003)

=== March ===
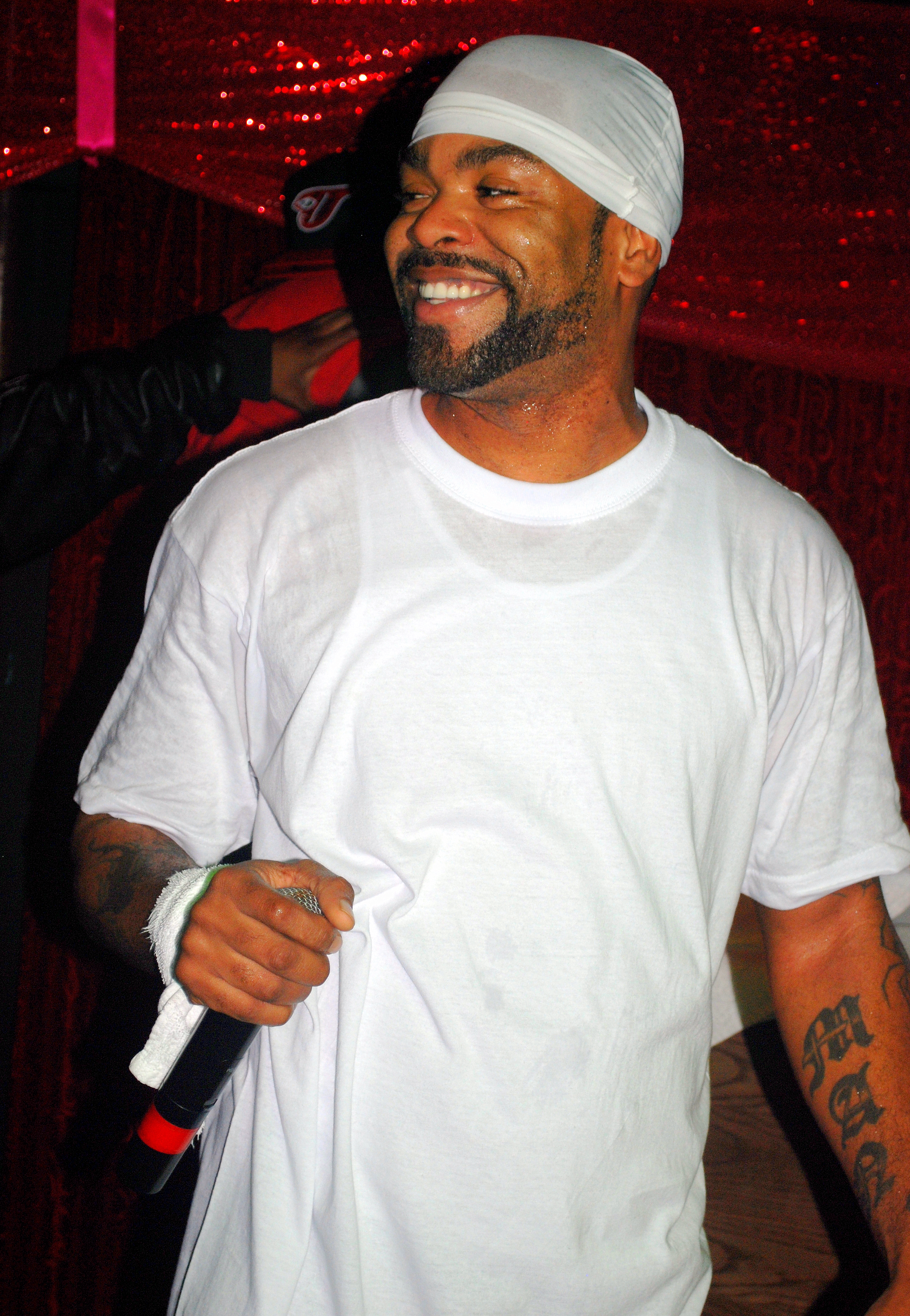
Method Man

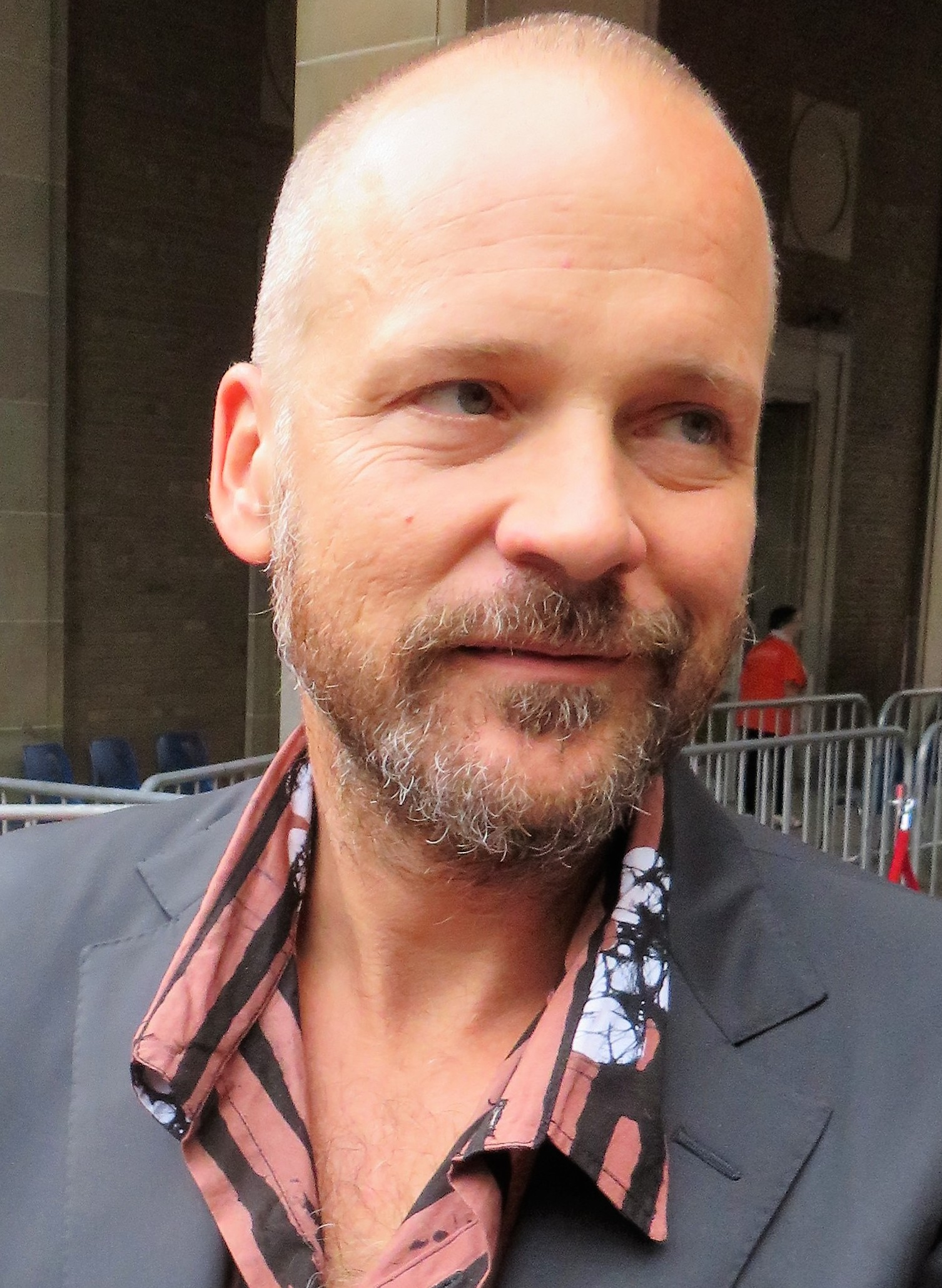
Peter Sarsgaard

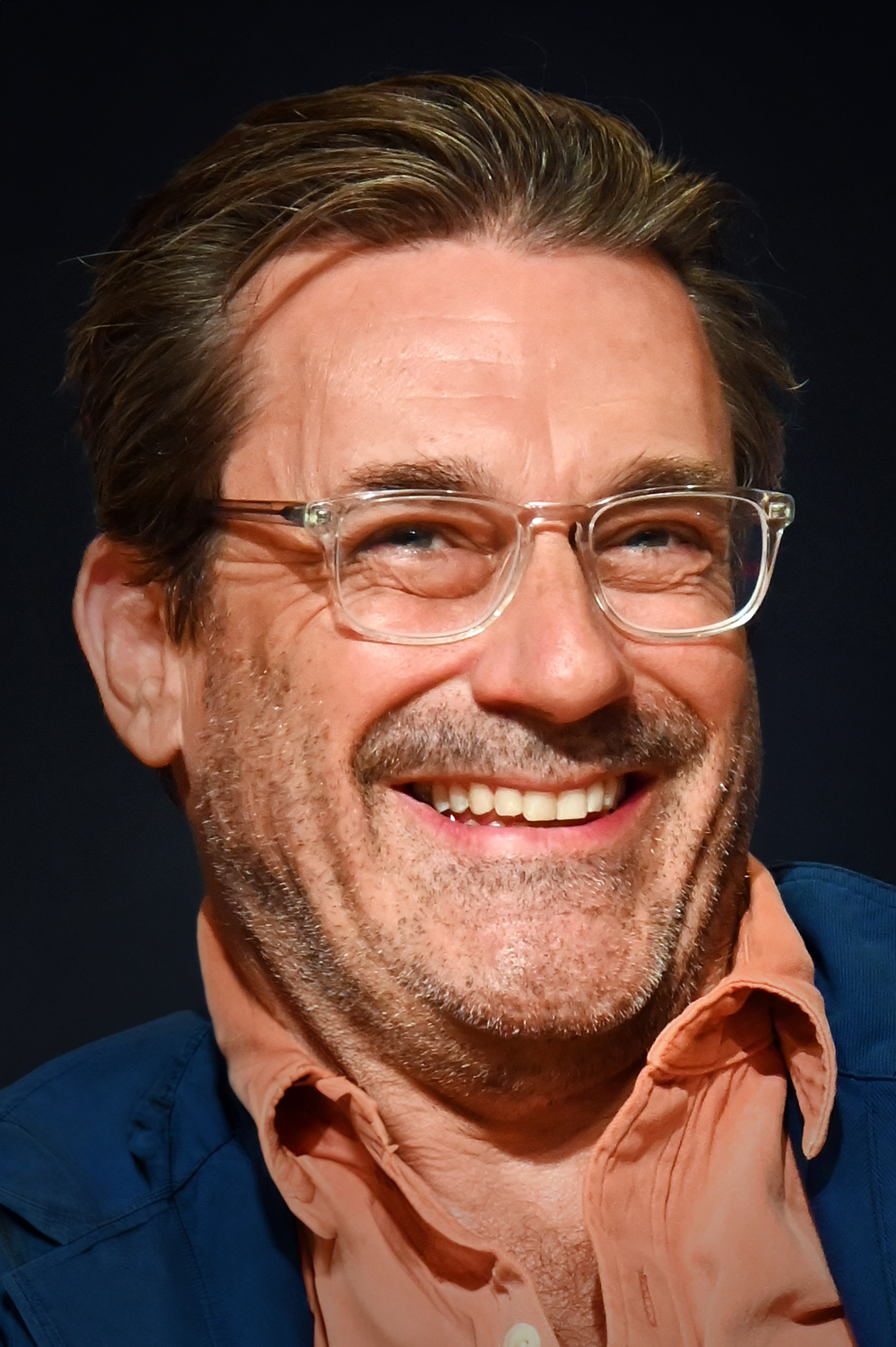
Jon Hamm

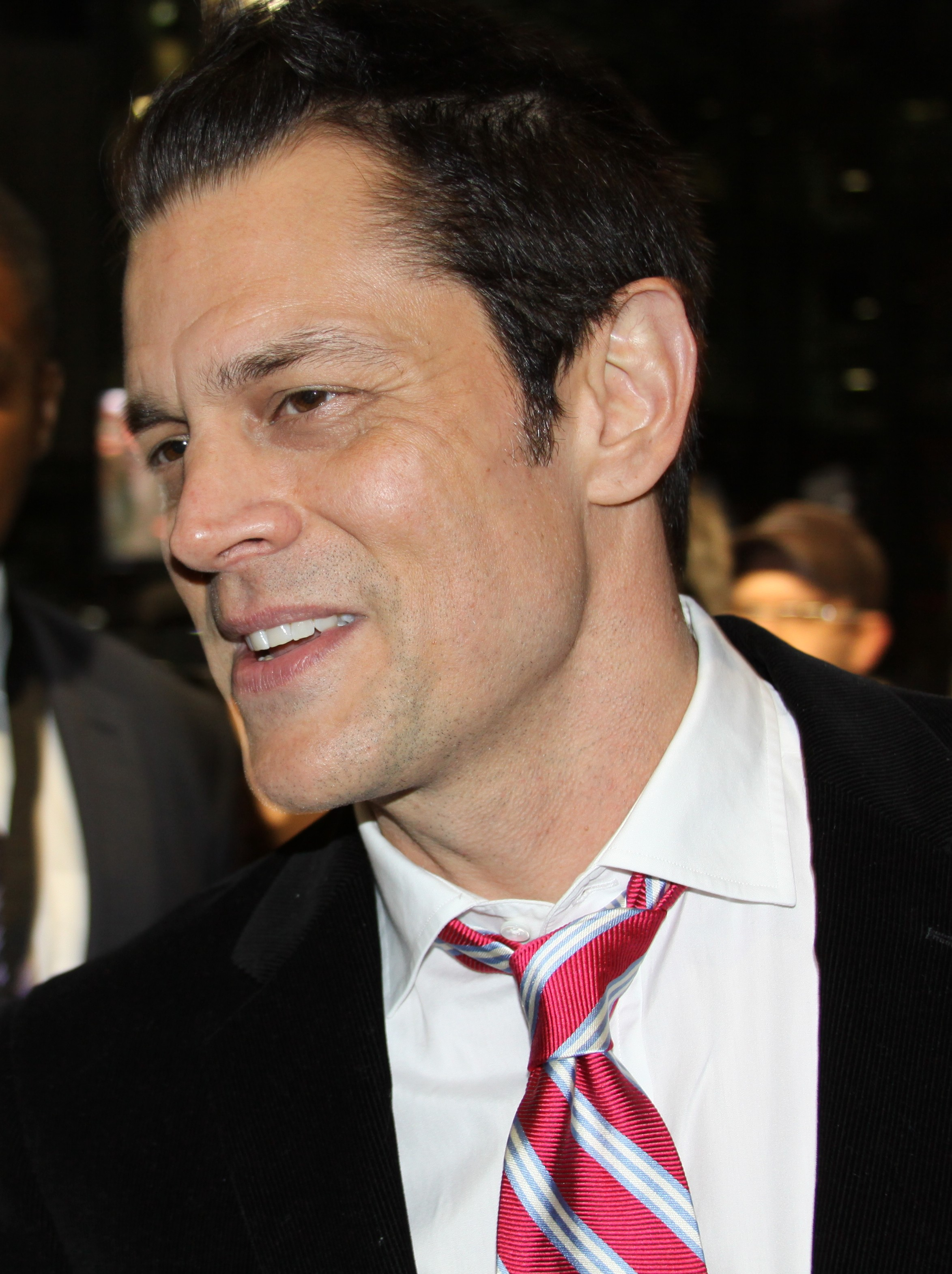
Johnny Knoxville

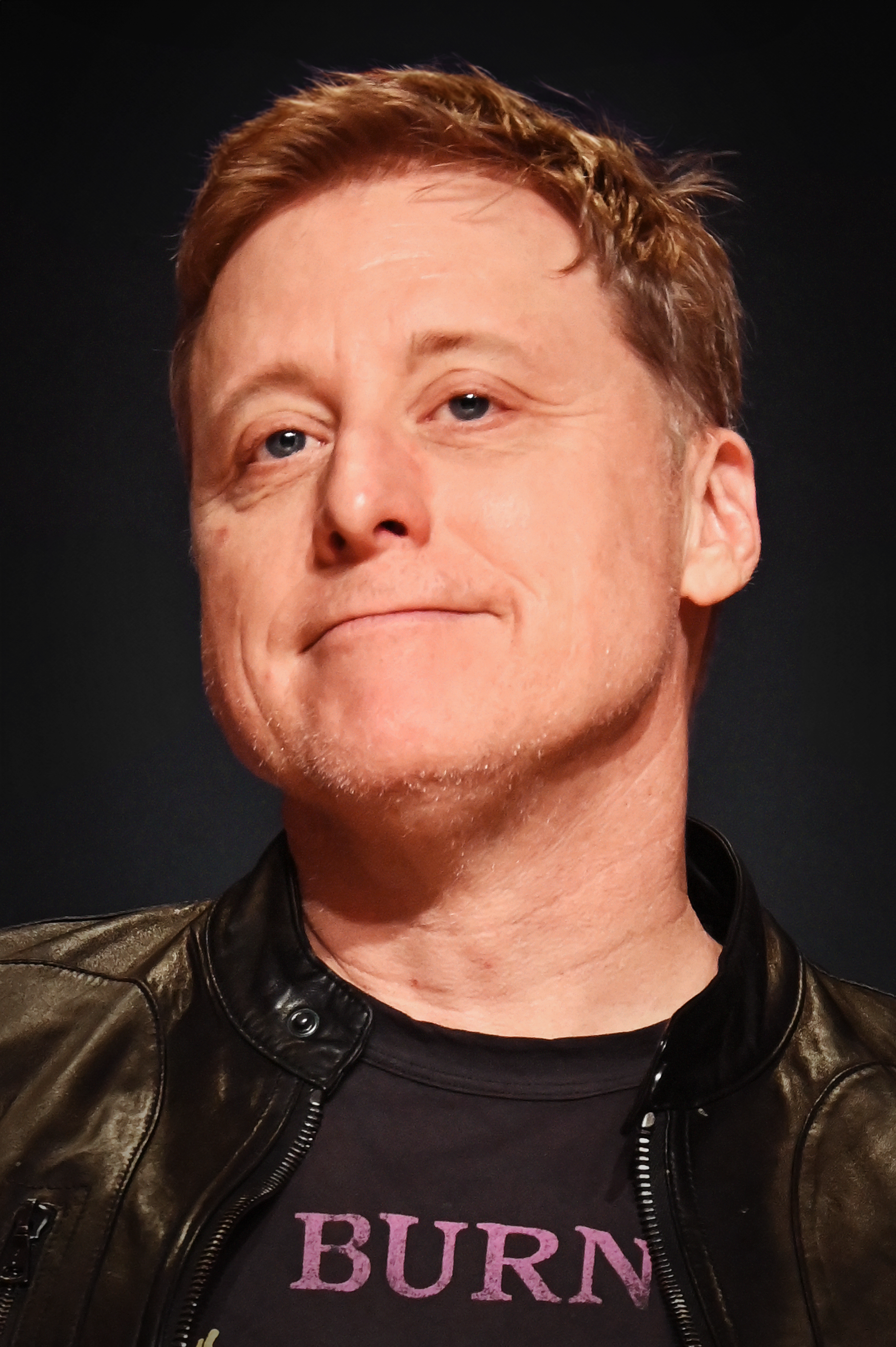
Alan Tudyk

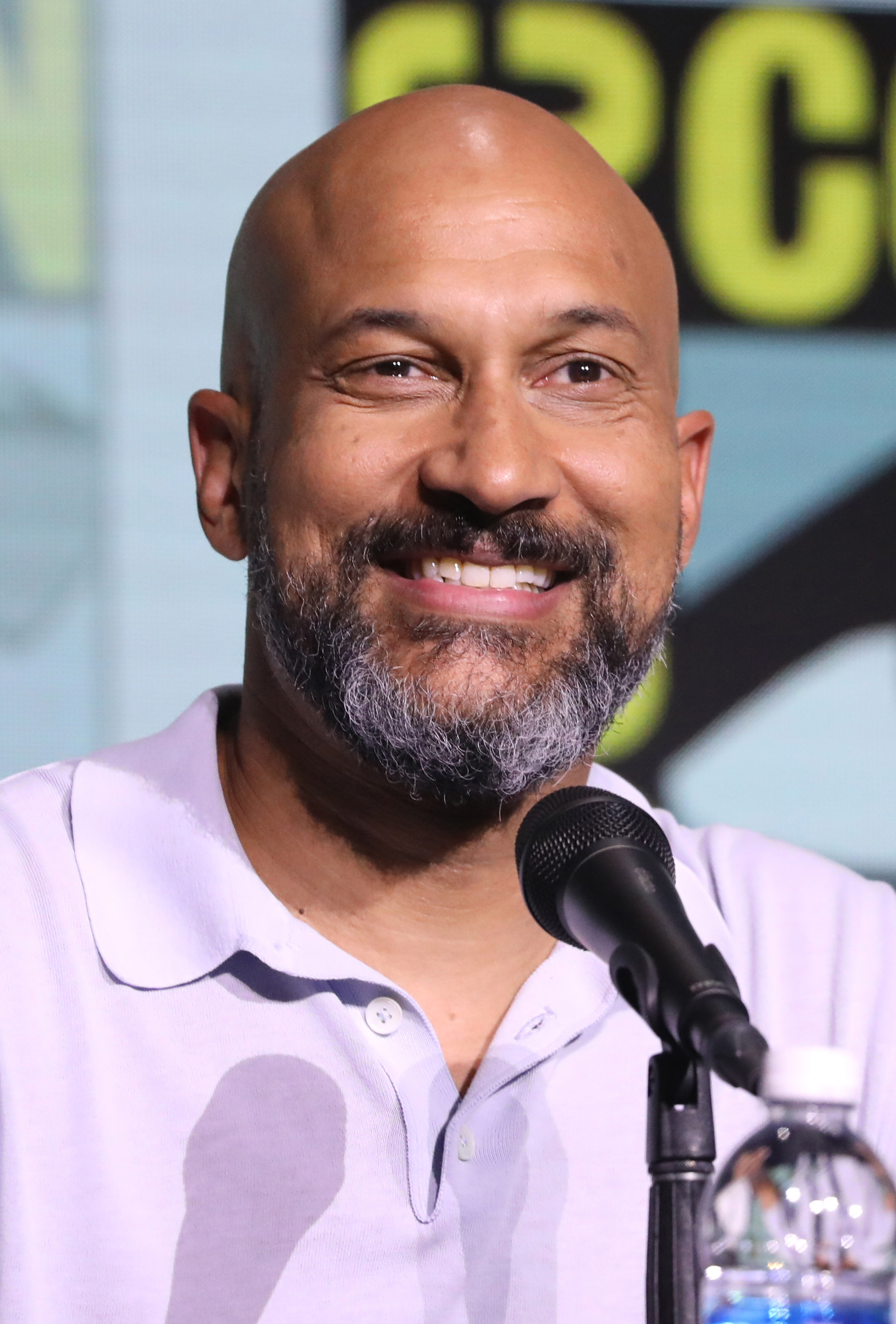
Keegan-Michael Key

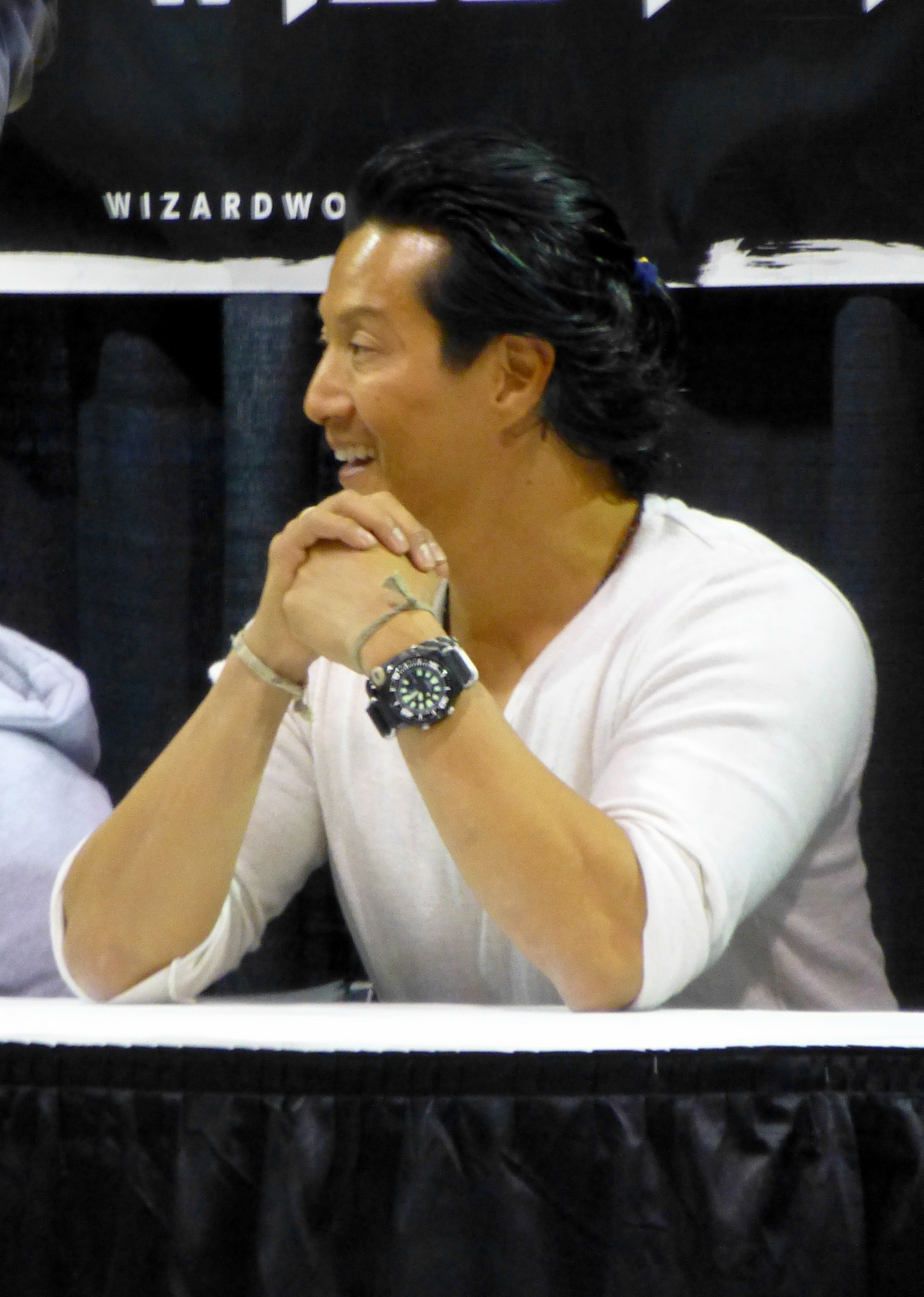
Will Yun Lee

- March 1 – Allen Johnson, Olympic hurdler
- March 2
  - Bootie Barker, NASCAR crew chief
  - Method Man, rapper, record producer, and actor
- March 4
  - Emily Bazelon, journalist
  - Michael D'Agostino, politician
  - Shavar Ross, actor and producer
- March 5
  - Chris Brown, politician
  - Yuri Lowenthal, actor, voice actor, producer, and screenwriter
  - Scott Mosier, producer
- March 7
  - Peter Sarsgaard, actor
- March 9
  - Kyle Balda, animator and director
  - Lou Benfatti, football player
  - C-Murder, rapper and songwriter
  - Mike DelGuidice, musician and singer/songwriter
  - Emmanuel Lewis, actor
- March 10
  - Brian Allgeier, video game designer
  - Doug Ardito, bassist for Puddle of Mudd
  - Paul Burmeister, sportscaster
  - Jon Hamm, actor, director, and producer
- March 11 – Johnny Knoxville, daredevil, actor, comedian, screenwriter, and film producer
- March 13
  - Matt Bollant, basketball coach
  - Mike Carey, politician
- March 14
  - Ernie Brown, football player
  - Jean Butler, dancer
- March 15
  - Todd Agnew, Christian singer/songwriter
  - Marcelle Bruce, soccer player
  - Chris Patton, voice actor
- March 16
  - Kenneth Brown, interior designer and decorator
  - Alan Tudyk, actor
- March 17 – Abraham Burton, saxophonist and bandleader
- March 18
  - Dwayne Armstrong, football player
  - Mike Bell, wrestler (d. 2008)
- March 19
  - Ben Albert, football player and coach
  - Kirk Botkin, football player and coach
  - Tim Brooks, basketball player
  - Dalton James, actor
- March 20 – Manny Alexander, Dominican-born baseball player
- March 22
  - Karen McDougal, model and actress
  - Keegan-Michael Key, actor, writer, and comedian
  - Will Yun Lee, actor
- March 23
  - Ira Black, heavy metal guitarist
  - Bill Kelliher, guitarist for Mastodon
  - Karen McDougal, model
- March 26
  - Michael Bennett, boxer
  - Rob Burger, composer
  - Erick Morillo, DJ, music producer, and record label owner (d. 2020)
- March 27 – John Best, basketball player
- March 28
  - Kieran Barton, soccer player
  - Mr. Cheeks, rapper
- March 29
  - Stephen Allison, politician
  - Robert Gibbs, White House Press Secretary
- March 30
  - Yaphett El-Amin, politician
  - Kristine Baker, judge
  - Mark Consuelos, Spanish-born actor
  - Mari Holden, cyclist
  - Indya Kincannon, politician, mayor of Knoxville, Tennessee (2019–present)
- March 31
  - Craig McCracken, animator, writer, and cartoonist
  - Rich Ruohonen, Olympic curler

=== April ===
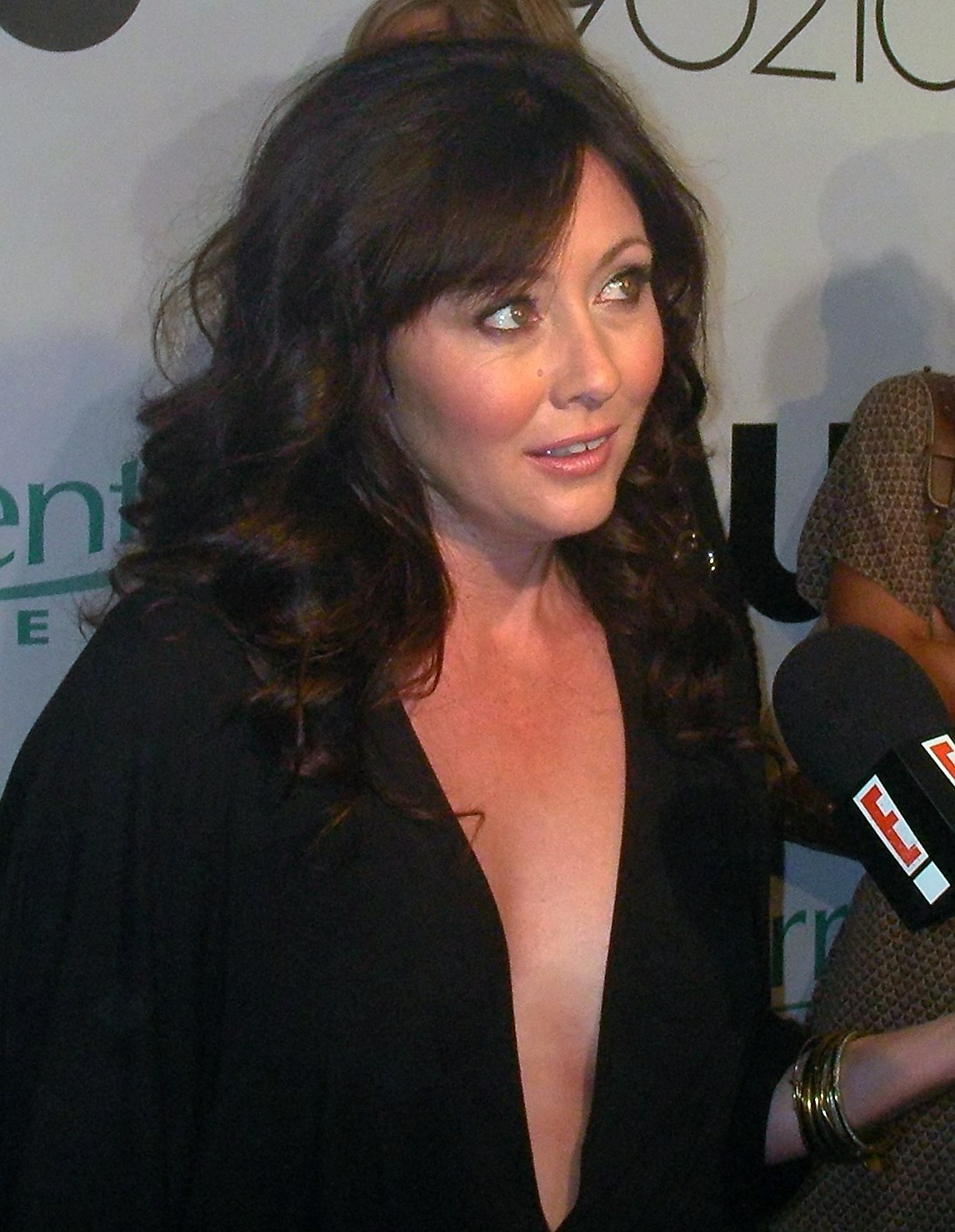
Shannen Doherty

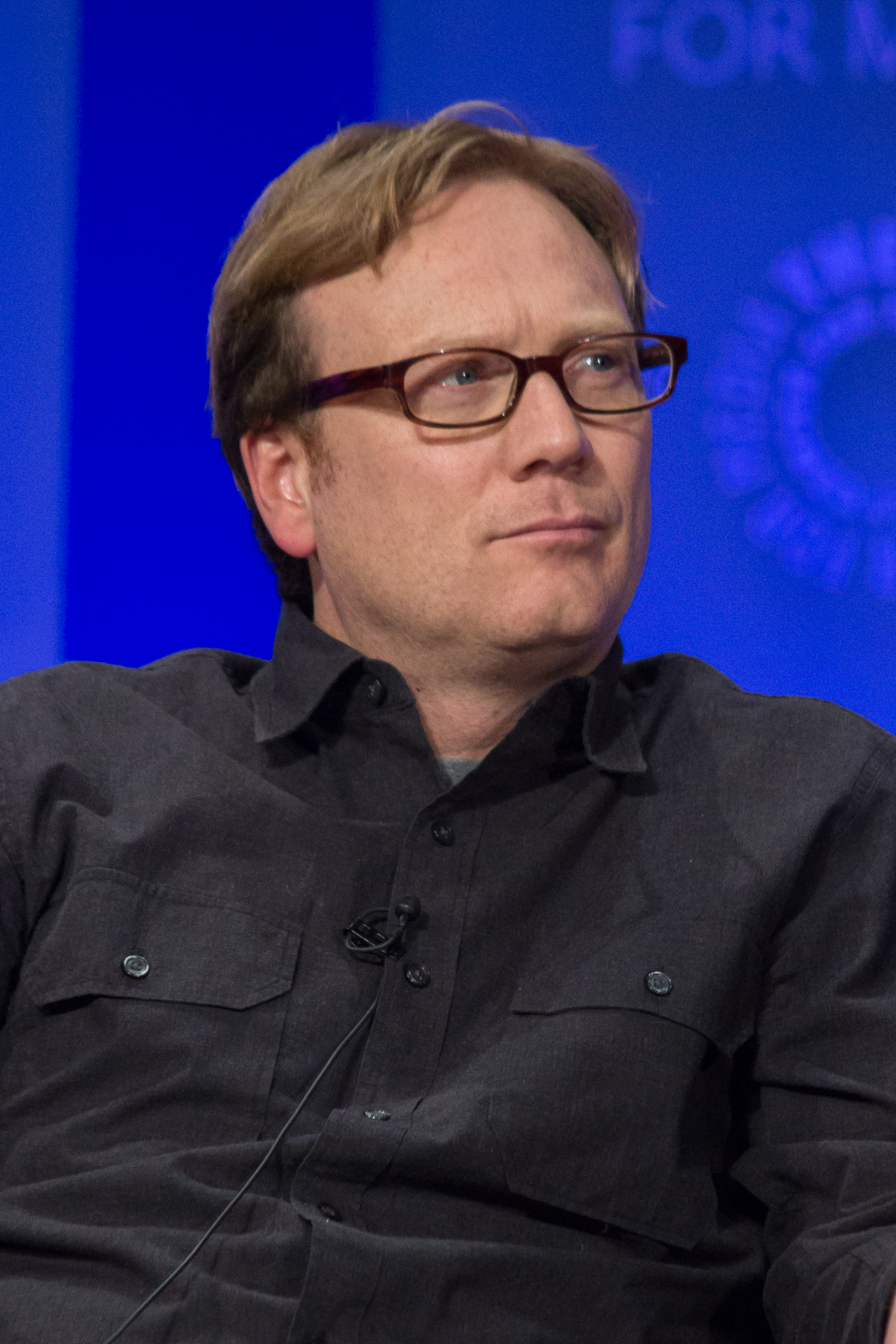
Andy Daly

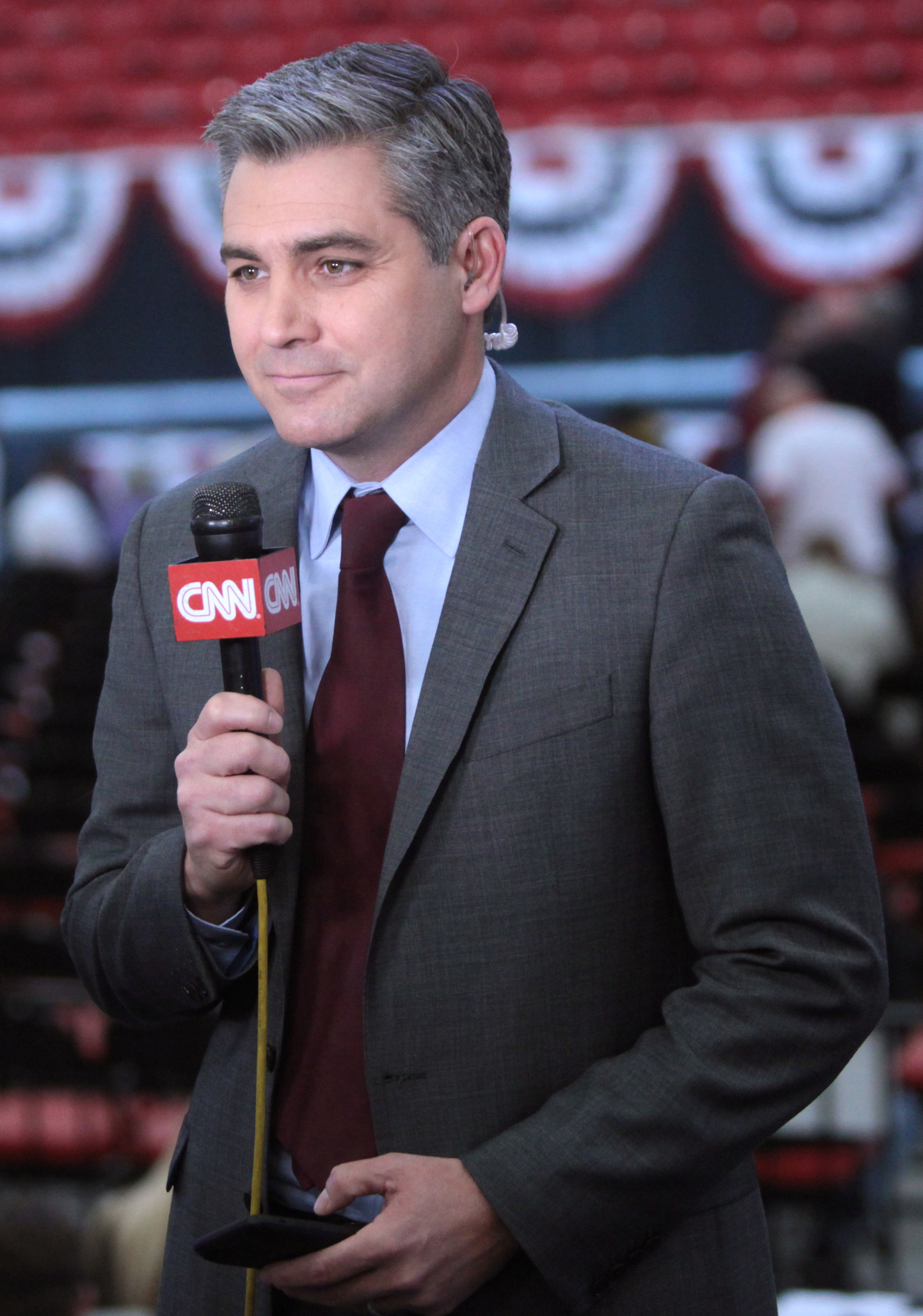
Jim Acosta

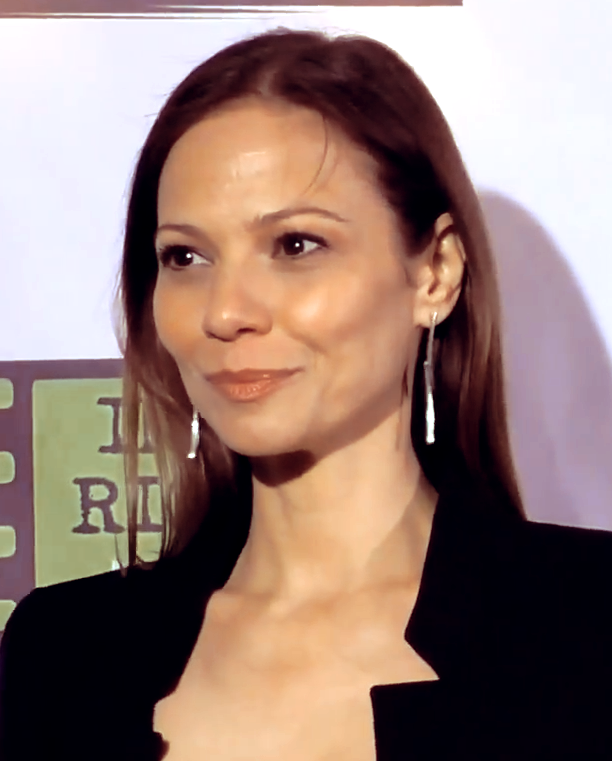
Tamara Braun

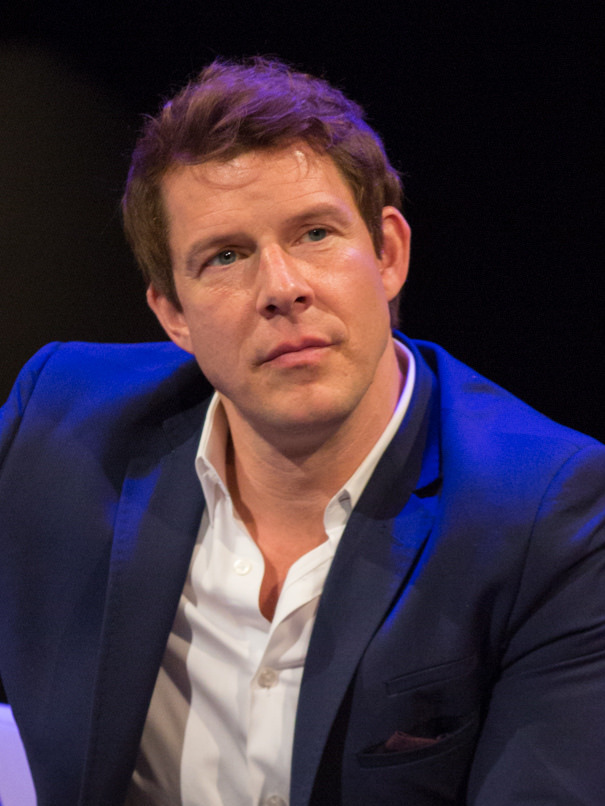
Eric Mabius

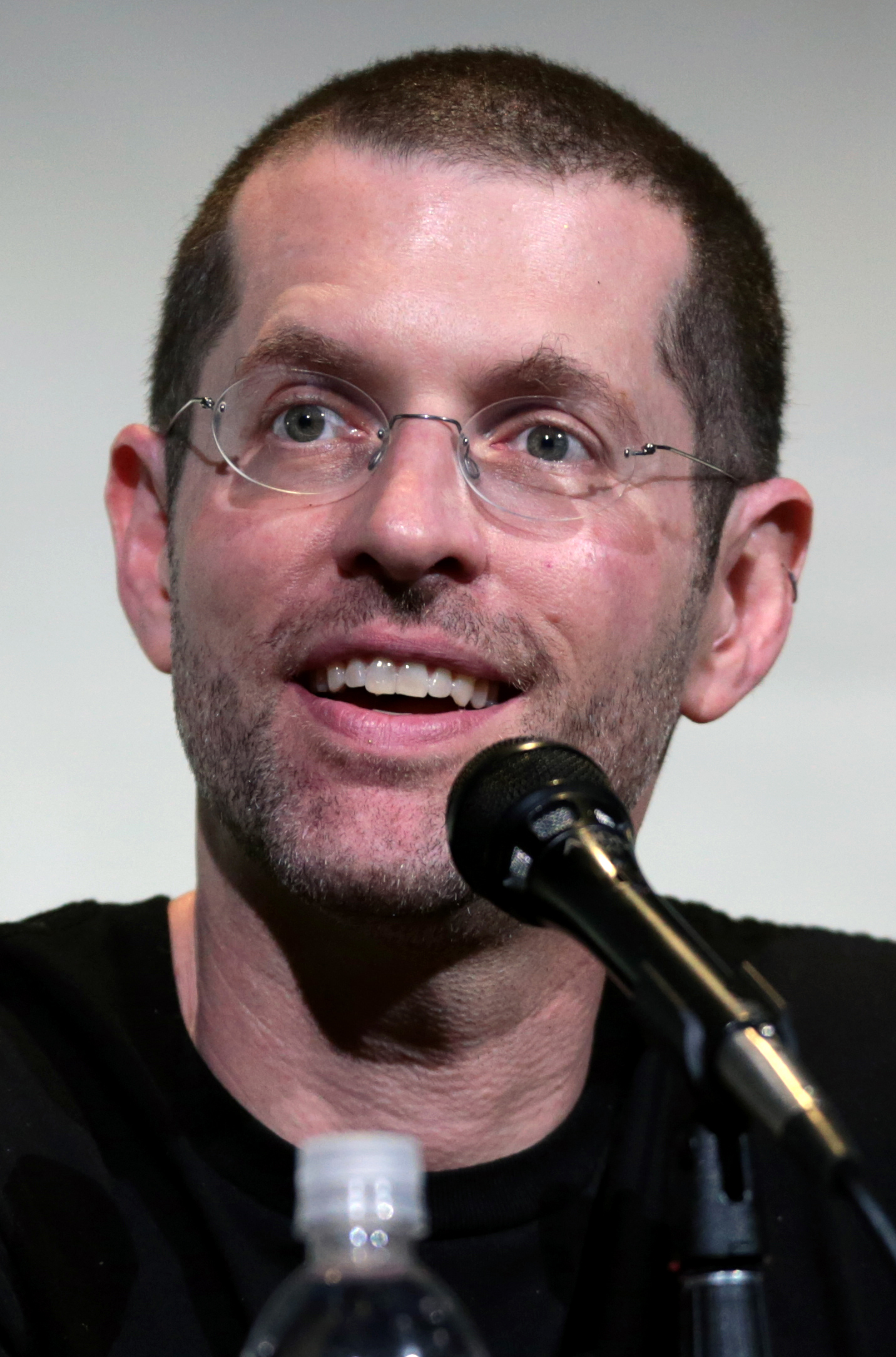
D.B. Weiss

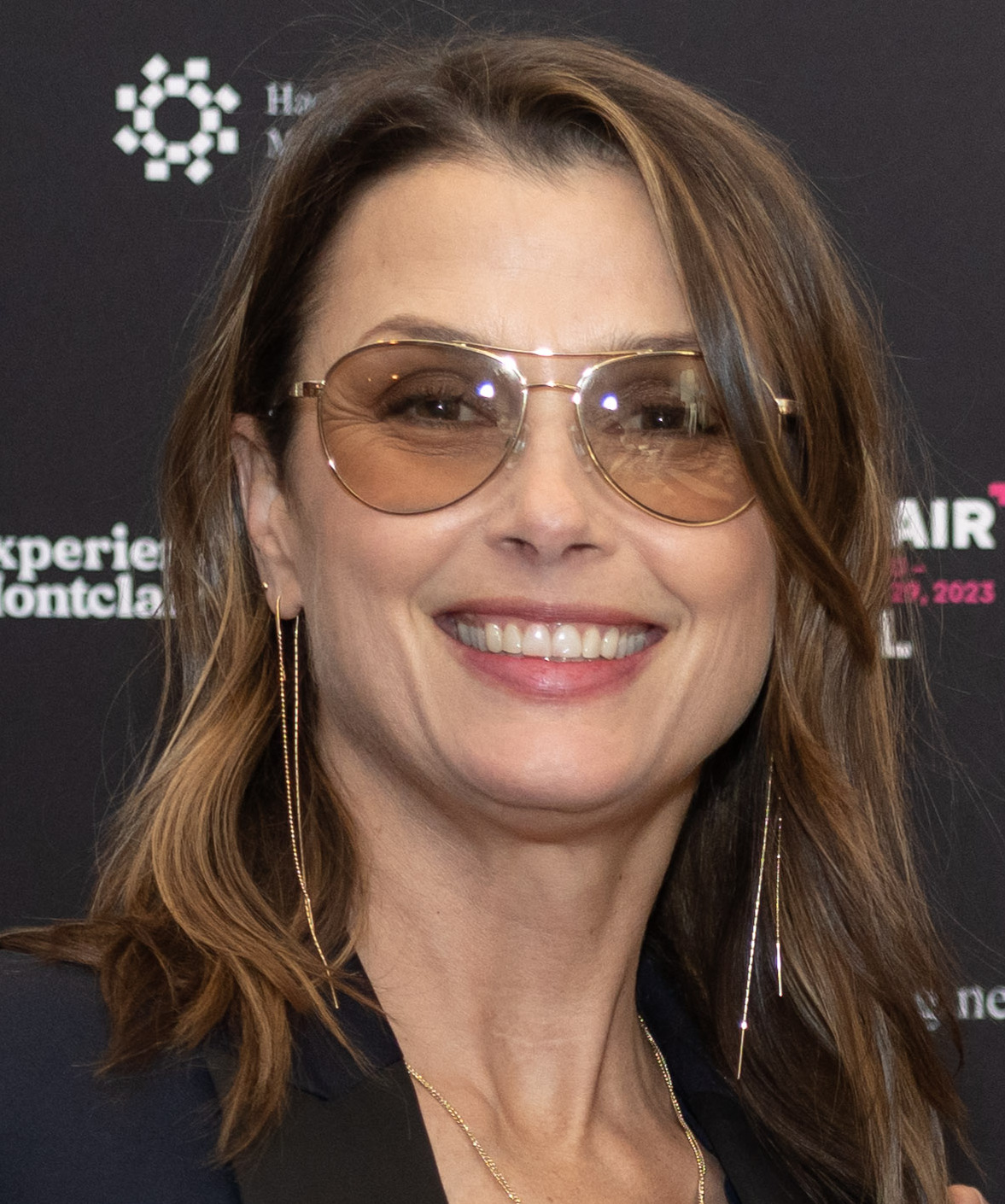
Bridget Moynahan

- April 1
  - Neal Bascomb, journalist and author
  - Jessica Collins, actress
- April 2 – Traci Braxton, singer (d. 2022)
- April 3
  - Shireen Abu Akleh, Palestinian-born journalist (d. 2022)
  - David Michael Barrett, screenwriter and film producer
  - Wes Berggren, guitarist for Tripping Daisy (d. 1999)
  - Troy Brown, basketball player
  - Alex Marvez, sportscaster, journalist, and author
  - Picabo Street, Olympic skier
- April 5
  - Kazim Ali, English-born poet, novelist, essayist, and professor
  - Krista Allen, actress, model, and comedian
- April 8
  - Cara Judea Alhadeff, photographer, performance artist, writer, activist, and yoga teacher
  - Dewan Bader, soccer player and coach
- April 10
  - Mihai Bagiu, Olympic gymnast
  - Joey DeFrancesco, musician (d. 2022)
  - Nana Smith, American born-Japanese tennis player
- April 11
  - Ellen Barry, journalist
  - Vicellous Reon Shannon, actor
- April 12
  - Nicholas Brendon, actor and writer (d. 2026)
  - Shannen Doherty, actress (d. 2024)
- April 14 – Tim Austin, boxer
- April 15
  - Derek Brown, football player
  - Andy Daly, actor and comedian
  - Jason Sehorn, football player
- April 16
  - Peter Billingsley, actor, director, and producer
  - Selena, entertainer and Tejano singer (d. 1995)
- April 17
  - Jim Acosta, news anchor and journalist
  - Michael Birawer, artist
- April 18
  - Tamara Braun, actress
  - Fredro Starr, rapper
- April 19
  - Derek Bryant, boxer
  - Cord Byrd, politician
  - Wendy Powell, voice actress
- April 20
  - Ron Barfield Jr., stock car racing driver
  - Bruce Beresford-Redman, producer and convicted murderer
  - Bernard Bull, academic administrator and scholar
  - Allan Houston, basketball player
  - Mikey Welsh, musician and artist (d. 2011)
- April 21 – Anwar al-Awlaki, imam (d. 2011)
- April 22 – Eric Mabius, actor
- April 23
  - Chuck Adams, tennis player
  - Andrew Kreisberg, writer, producer, and comic book writer
  - D.B. Weiss, producer, writer, and novelist
- April 24
  - Anastasia Barzee, actress
  - Jeff Brohm, football player and coach
- April 26
  - Shondrella Avery, actress
  - Jay DeMarcus, singer and bassist for Rascal Flatts
- April 27
  - Hayley Barr, actress
  - James Burton, football player
  - Ernest Morrell, academic (d. 2026)
- April 28
  - Barry Burden, political scientist
  - Bridget Moynahan, actress
- April 29
  - Bob Byington, director, screenwriter, and actor
  - Tamara Johnson-George, singer
  - Darby Stanchfield, actress

=== May ===
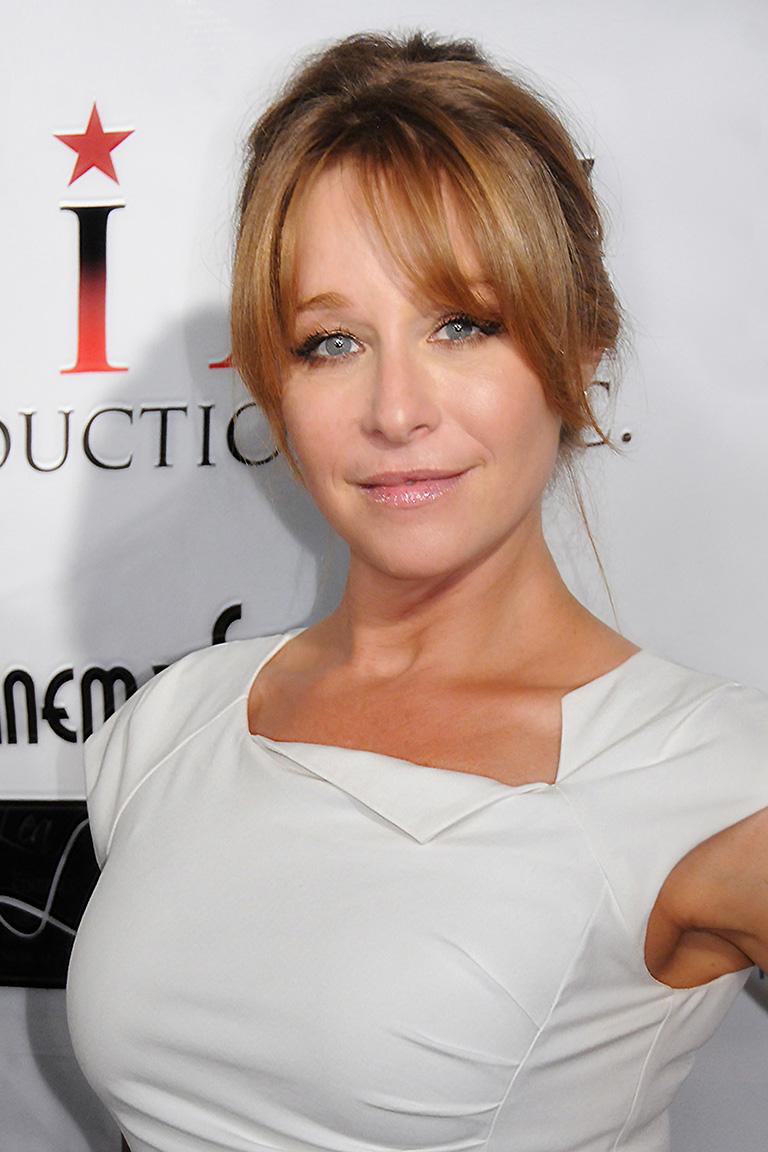
Jamie Luner

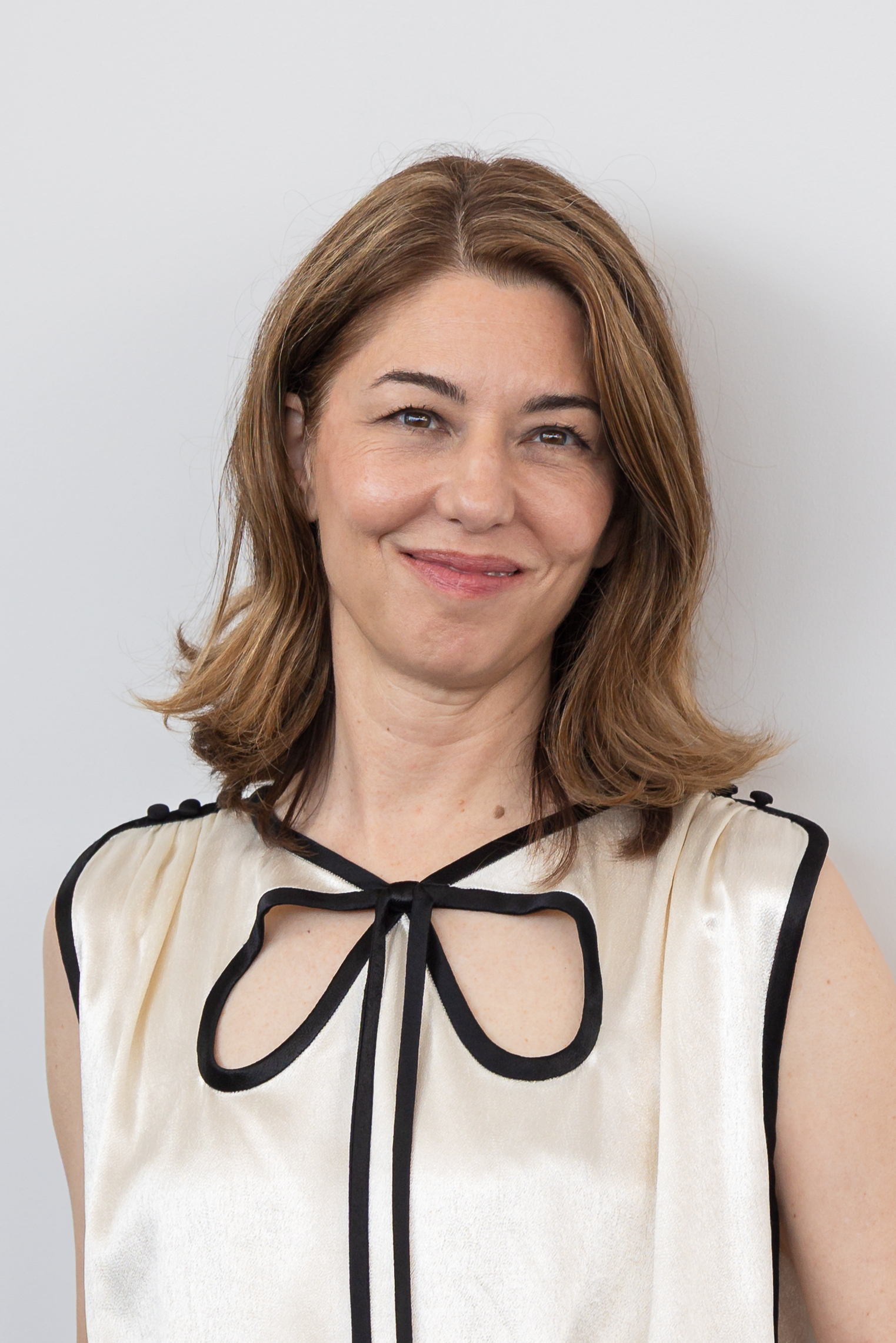
Sofia Coppola

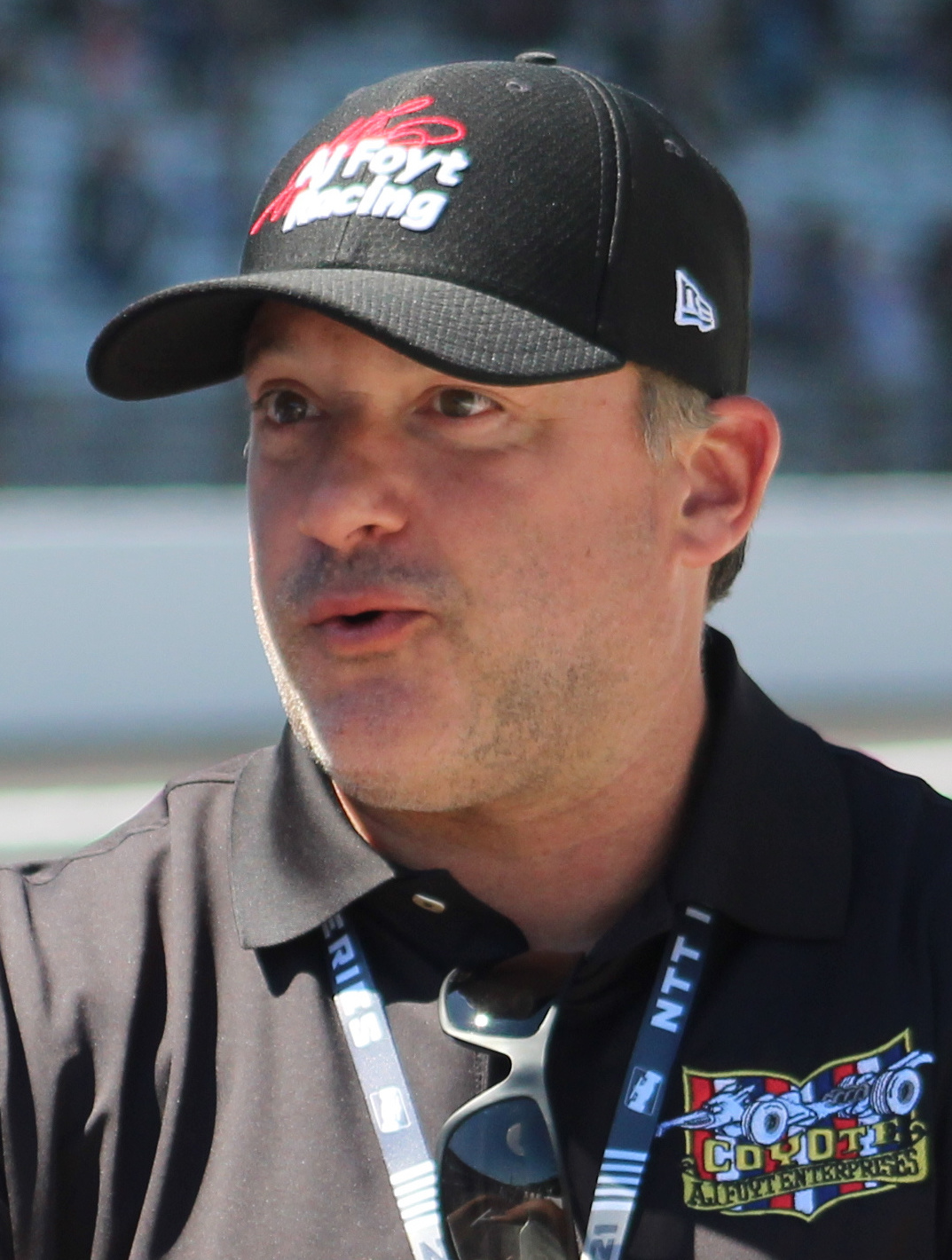
Tony Stewart

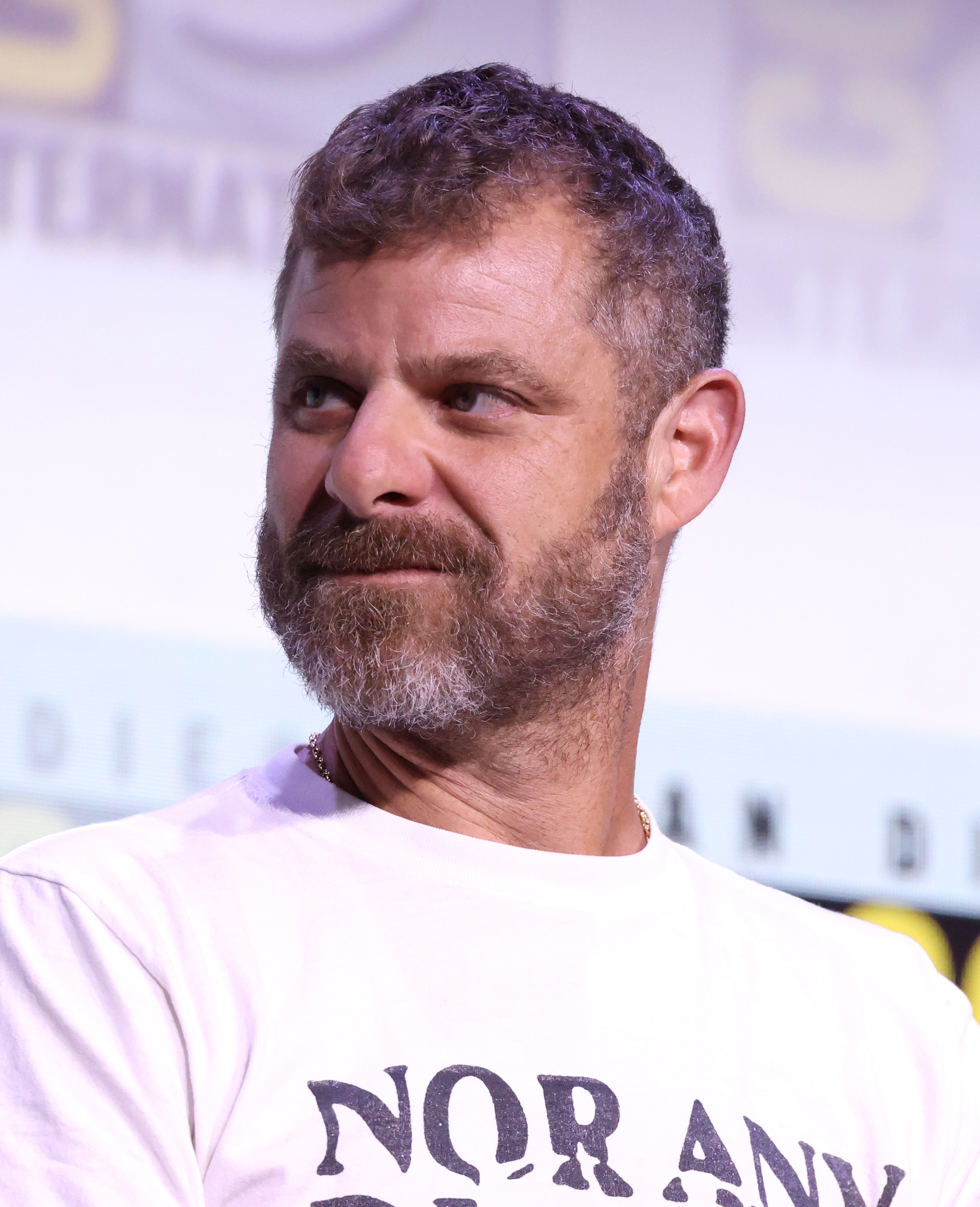
Matt Stone

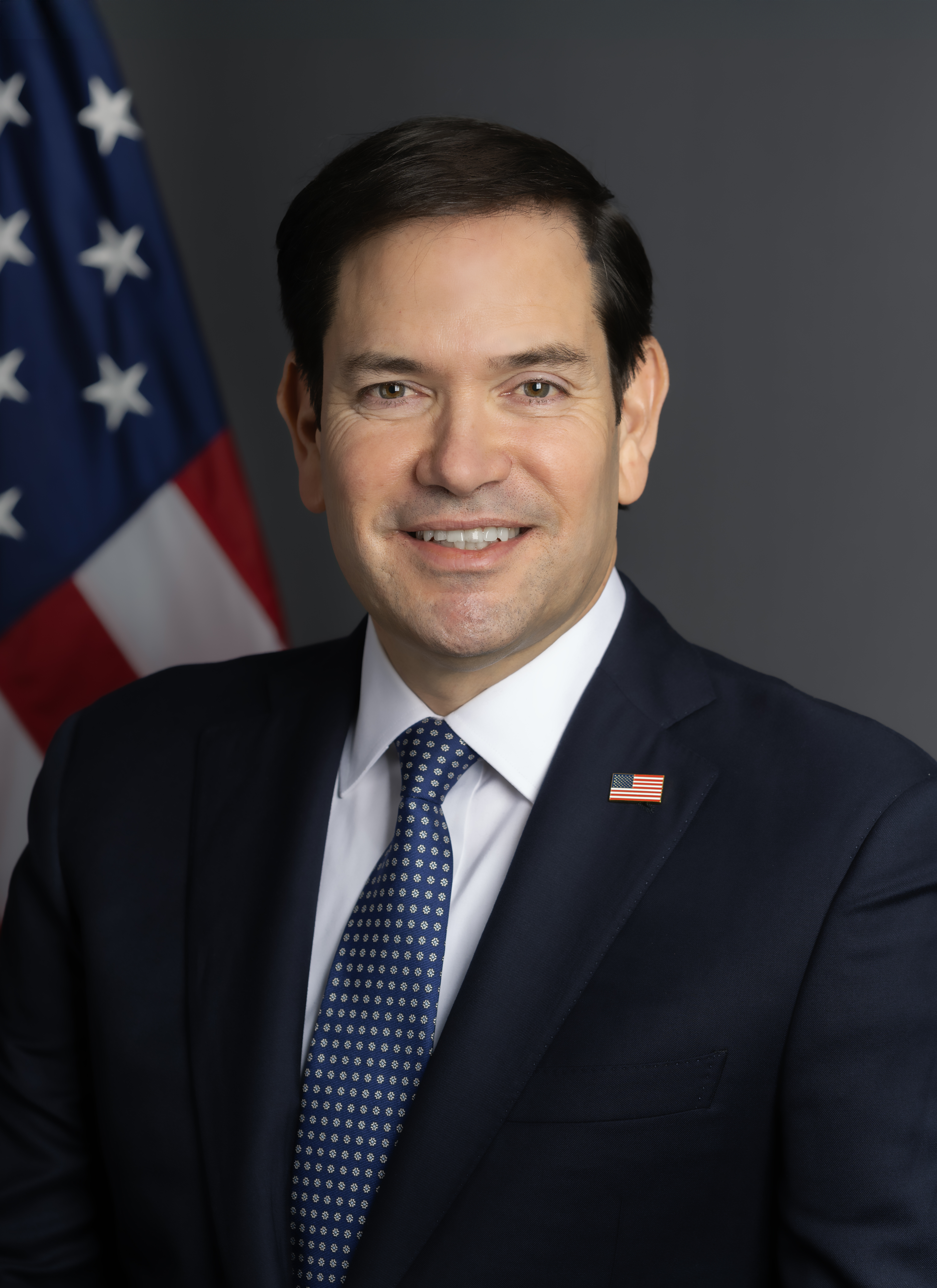
Marco Rubio

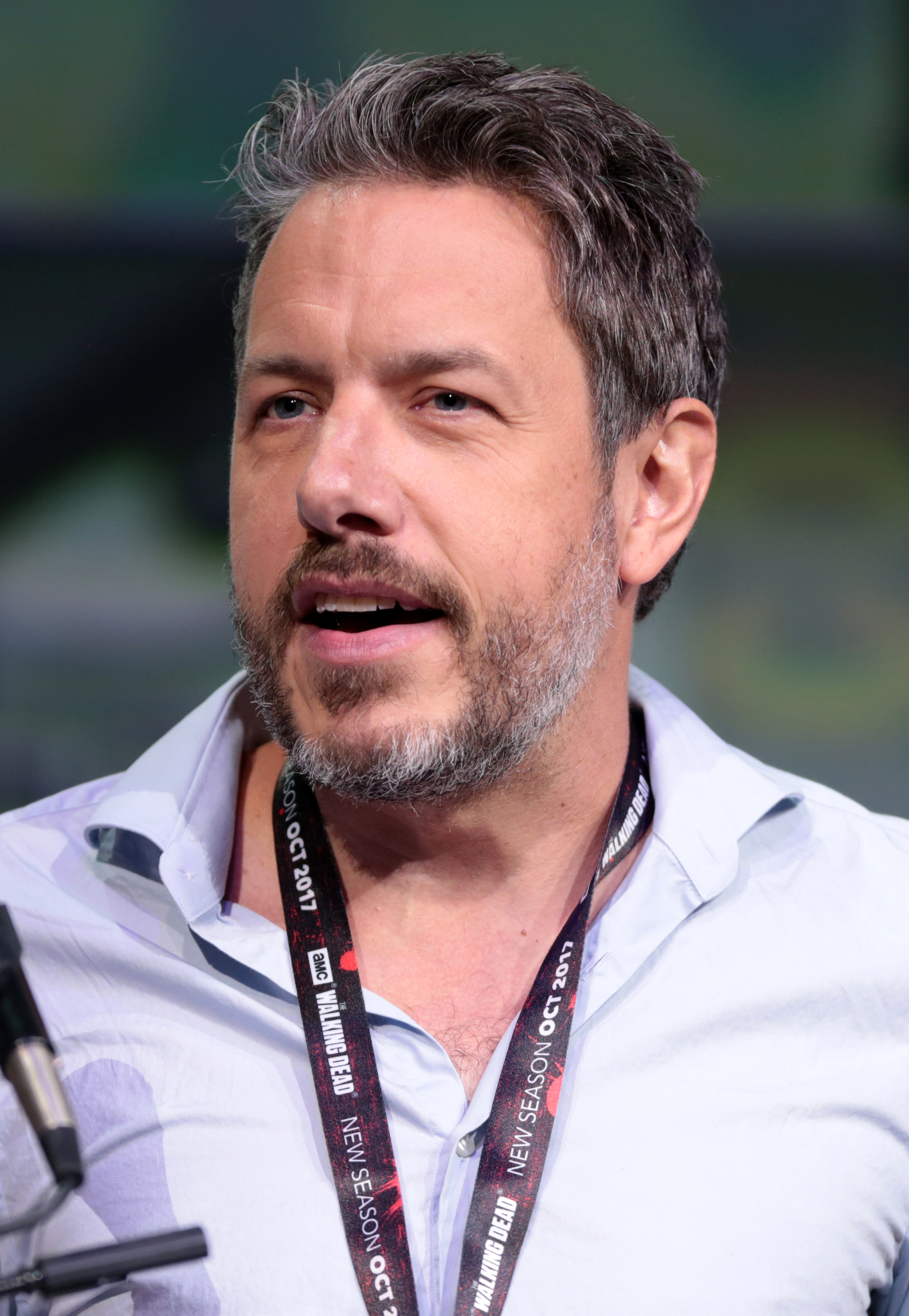
John Ross Bowie

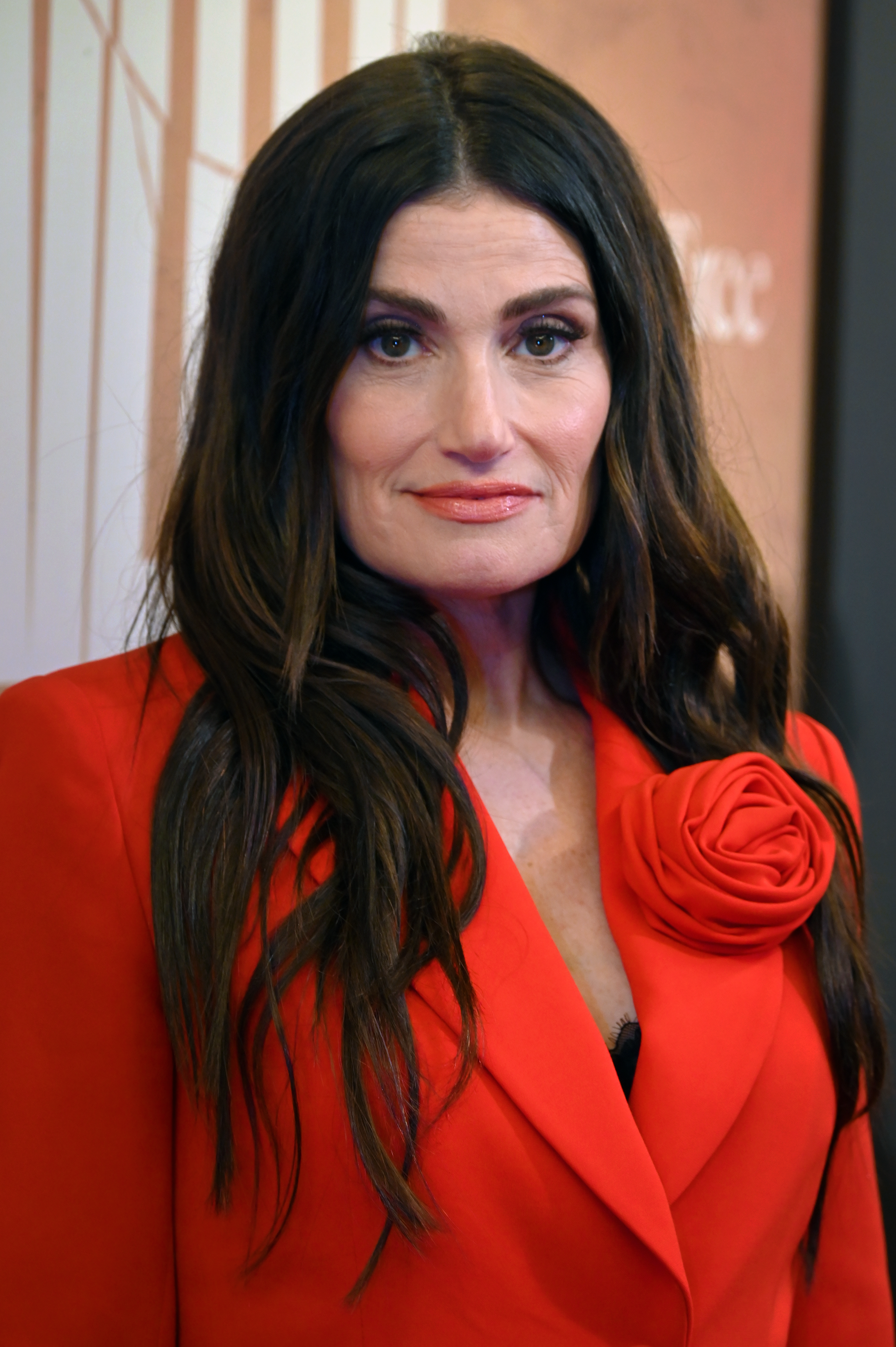
Idina Menzel

- May 1
  - Ethan Albright, football player
  - Catharine Baker, attorney and politician
  - Timothy D. Bellavia, children's author, fabric artist, and educator
  - Alundis Brice, football player
- May 2
  - Greg Bishop, football player
  - Brent Bowers, baseball player
- May 4
  - Dave Aronberg, politician
  - Joe Borowski, baseball player
  - David Blackwell, football player and coach
- May 5 – Dresta, rapper
- May 6
  - Bryan Beller, bassist
  - Geneva Carr, actress
  - Chris Shiflett, guitarist for Foo Fighters
- May 7
  - Pablo Almaguer, lawyer and politician
  - Lloyd Anoa'i, wrestler
  - Ana Lucia Araujo, Brazilian-born historian, author, and university professor
- May 8
  - Ross Anderson, speed skier
  - Kevin Bellie, director and choreographer
  - Bob Guiney, television personality, singer, and insurance carrier consultant
- May 10
  - Glen Barker, baseball player
  - John E. Bradley, politician
- May 11
  - Aaron Accetta, record producer, songwriter, and musician
  - Malaika Griffin, anti-white racist convicted of the 1999 murder of Jason Patrick Horsley
- May 12
  - Daron Alcorn, football player
  - Doug Basham, wrestler
  - Jamie Luner, actress
- May 13
  - Jeremy Allaire, technologist and internet entrepreneur
  - Omer Avital, Israeli-born jazz musician
  - O.C., rapper
- May 14
  - Gregory A. Baca, attorney and politician
  - Deanne Bray, actress
  - Sofia Coppola, screenwriter, director, producer, and actress, daughter of Francis Ford Coppola
- May 15 – Phil Pfister, strongman
- May 17 – Danny Barber, soccer player
- May 18
  - Erik K. Alexander, endocrinologist and medical researcher
  - Bob Boyle, animator, producer, writer, storyboard artist, and director
  - Karyn Bye-Dietz, ice hockey player
  - Brad Friedel, soccer player
  - Desiree Horton, helicopter pilot, television reporter and aerial firefighter
- May 19 – Stephanie Nadolny, voice actress and singer
- May 20 – Tony Stewart, race car driver
- May 21
  - Joe Benitez, comic book artist
  - Jamal Harrison Bryant, minister, author, and political candidate
- May 22
  - Afrika Baby Bam, rapper
  - Troy Barnhart Jr., Olympic water polo player
- May 23
  - Katherine Baicker, health economist
  - Issac Booth, football player
  - Marshall Boze, baseball player
- May 24 – Troy Barnett, football player
- May 25
  - Michelle Bowman, politician
  - Sonya Smith, actress
- May 26
  - Monte Barrett, boxer
  - Jason Bere, baseball player
  - Derek Brown, politician
  - Matt Stone, actor, animator, and producer
- May 27
  - Corey Beck, basketball player
  - Lisa Lopes, rapper, singer, songwriter, and dancer (d. 2002)
- May 28
  - Nick Bravin, Olympic fencer and lawyer
  - Marco Rubio, politician, U.S. Secretary of State (2025–present)
  - Mosh, wrestler
- May 29 – Kim Berfield, politician
- May 30
  - John Ross Bowie, actor and comedian
  - Idina Menzel, actress and singer/songwriter
- May 31 – Thomas Ambrosio, university professor

=== June ===
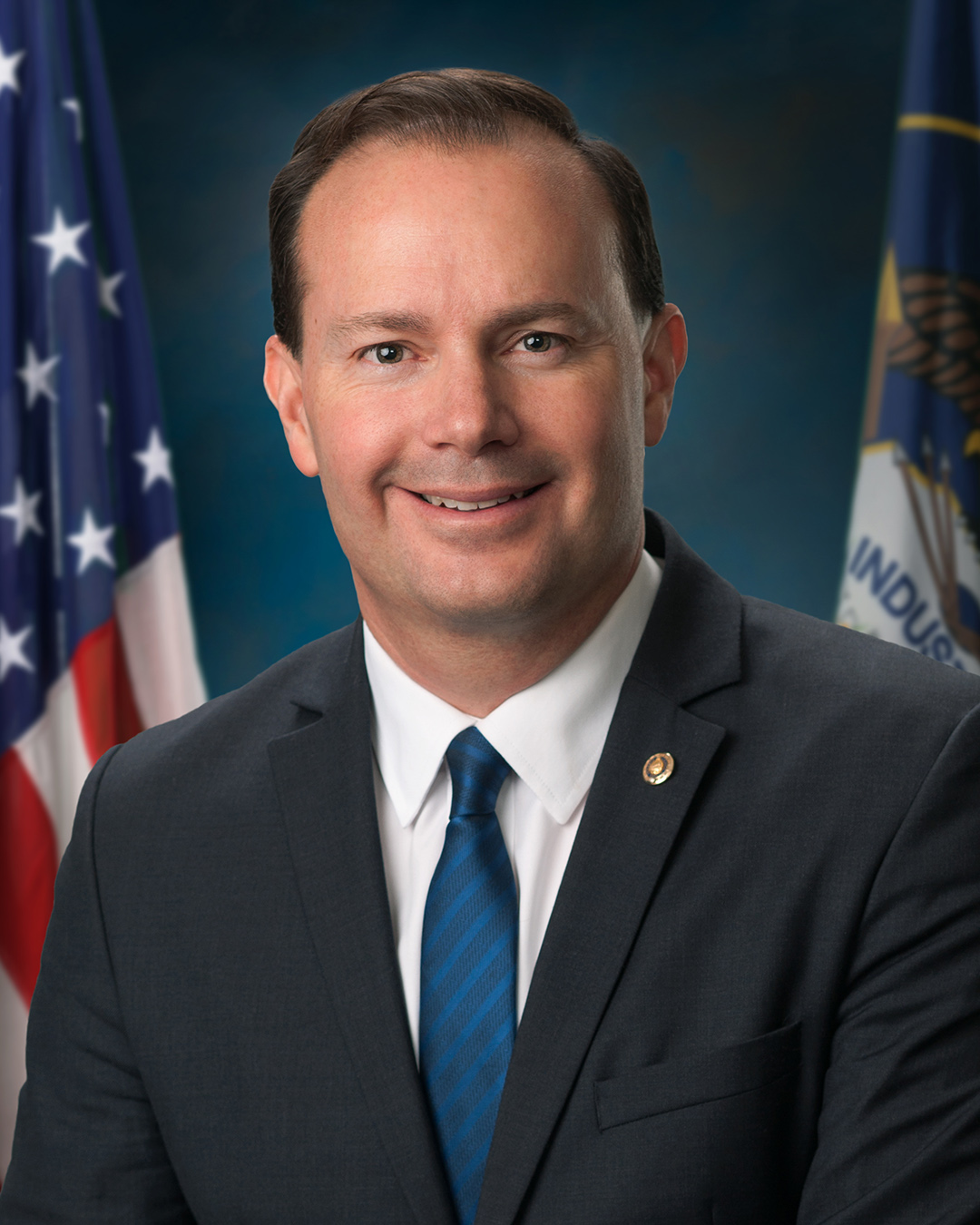
Mike Lee

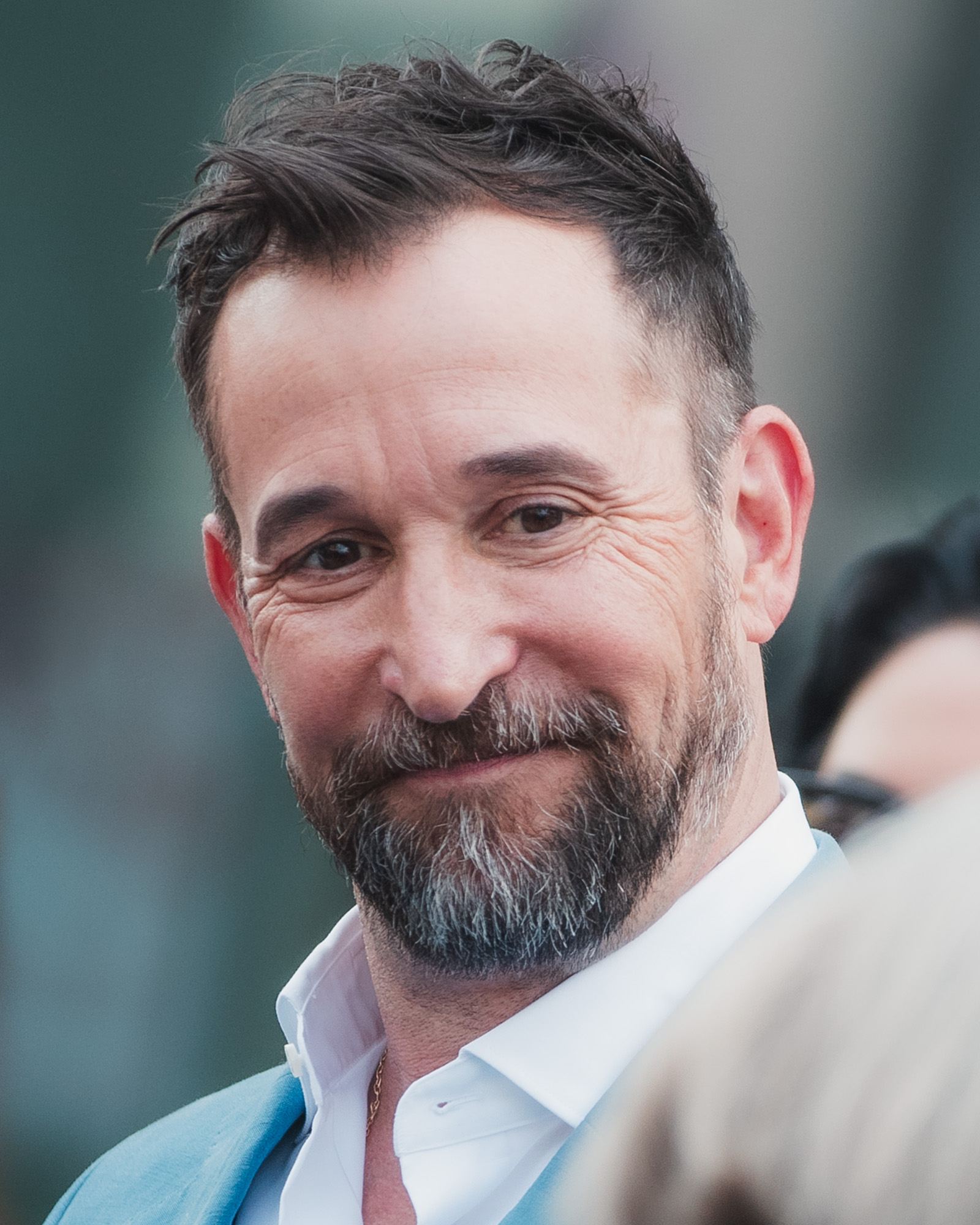
Noah Wyle

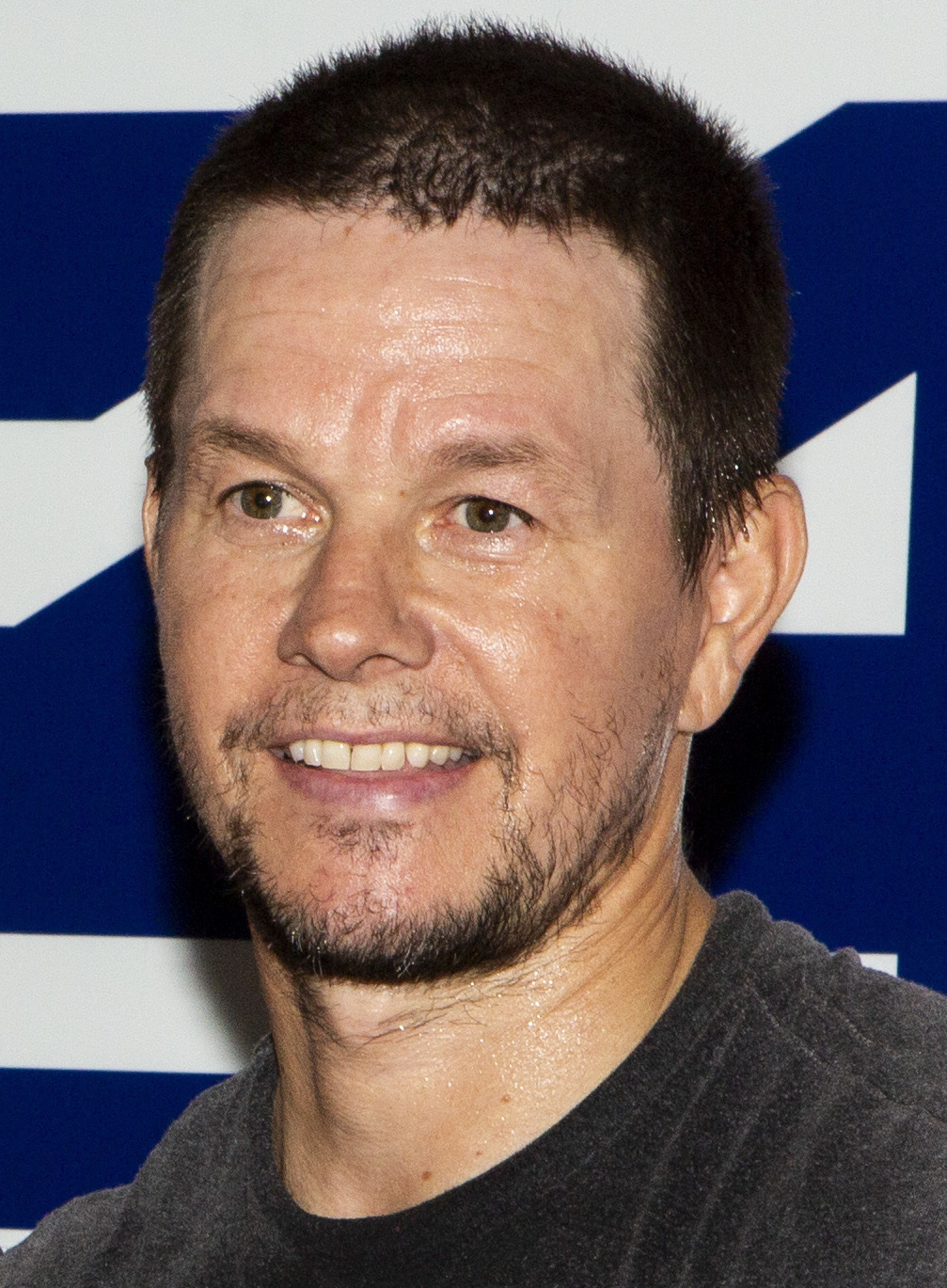
Mark Wahlberg

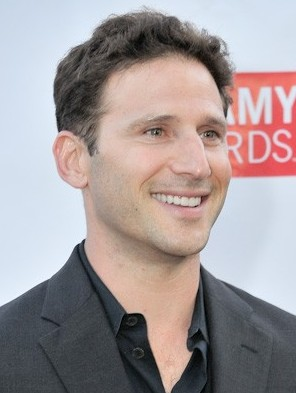
Mark Feuerstein

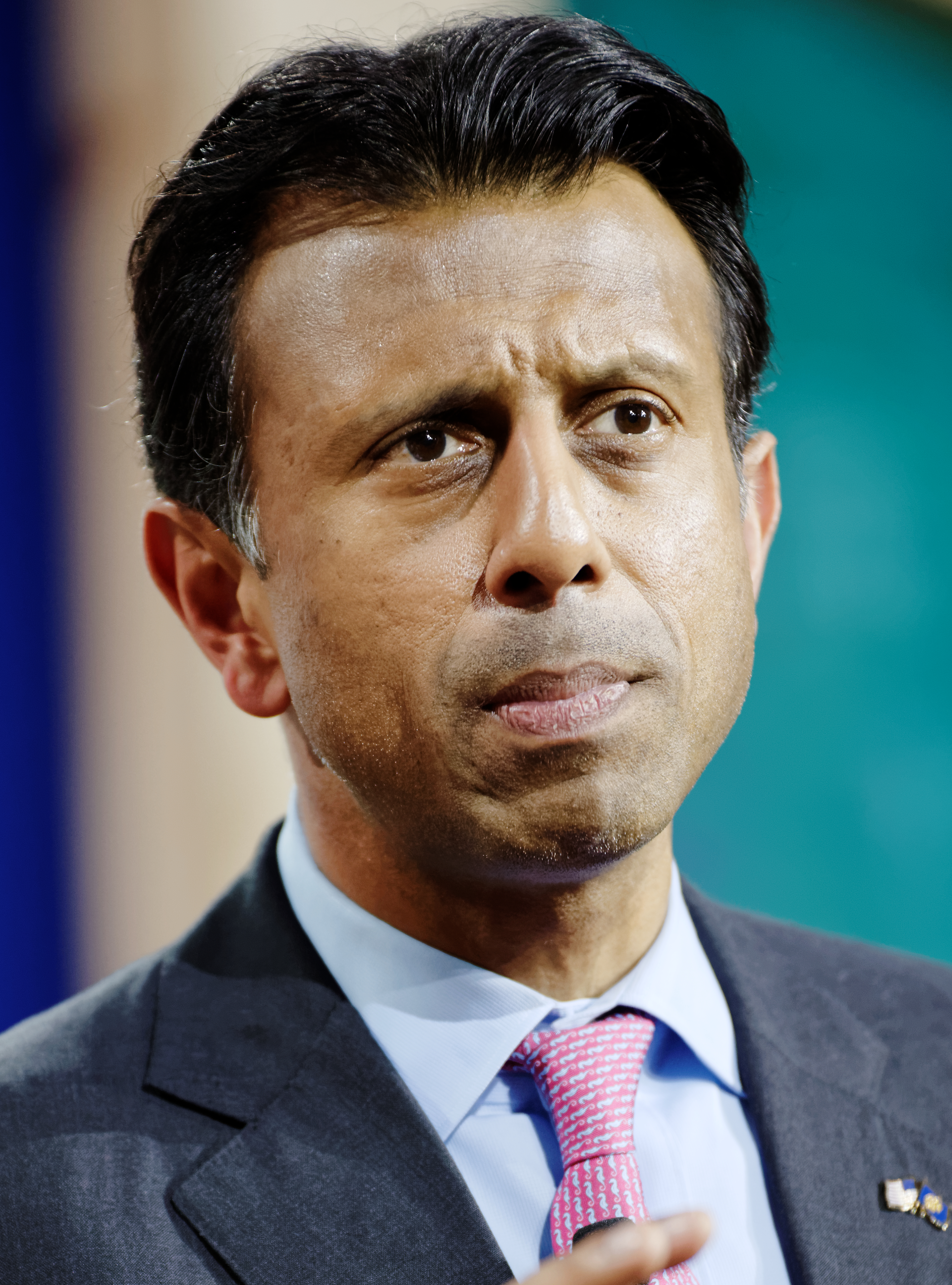
Bobby Jindal

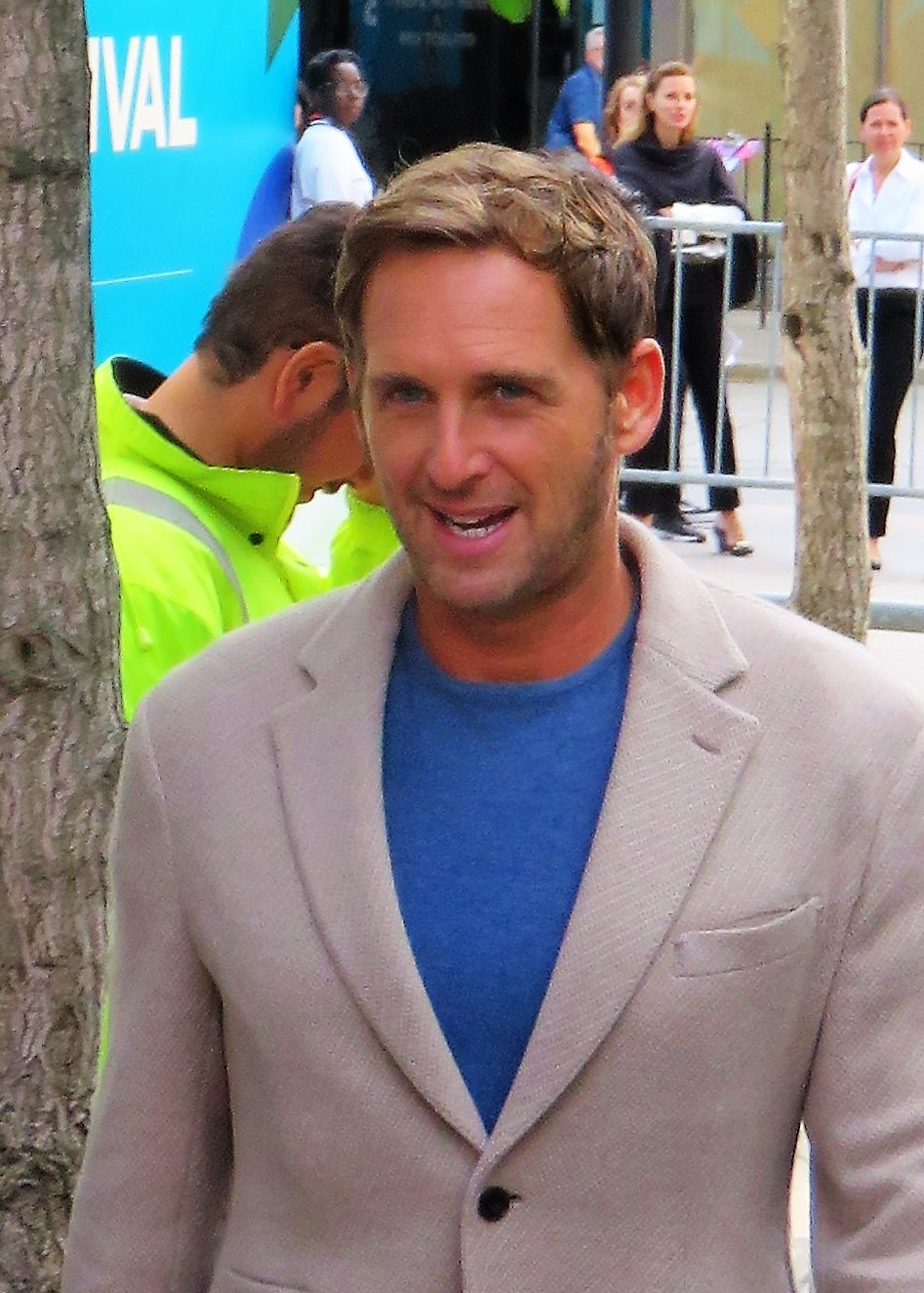
Josh Lucas

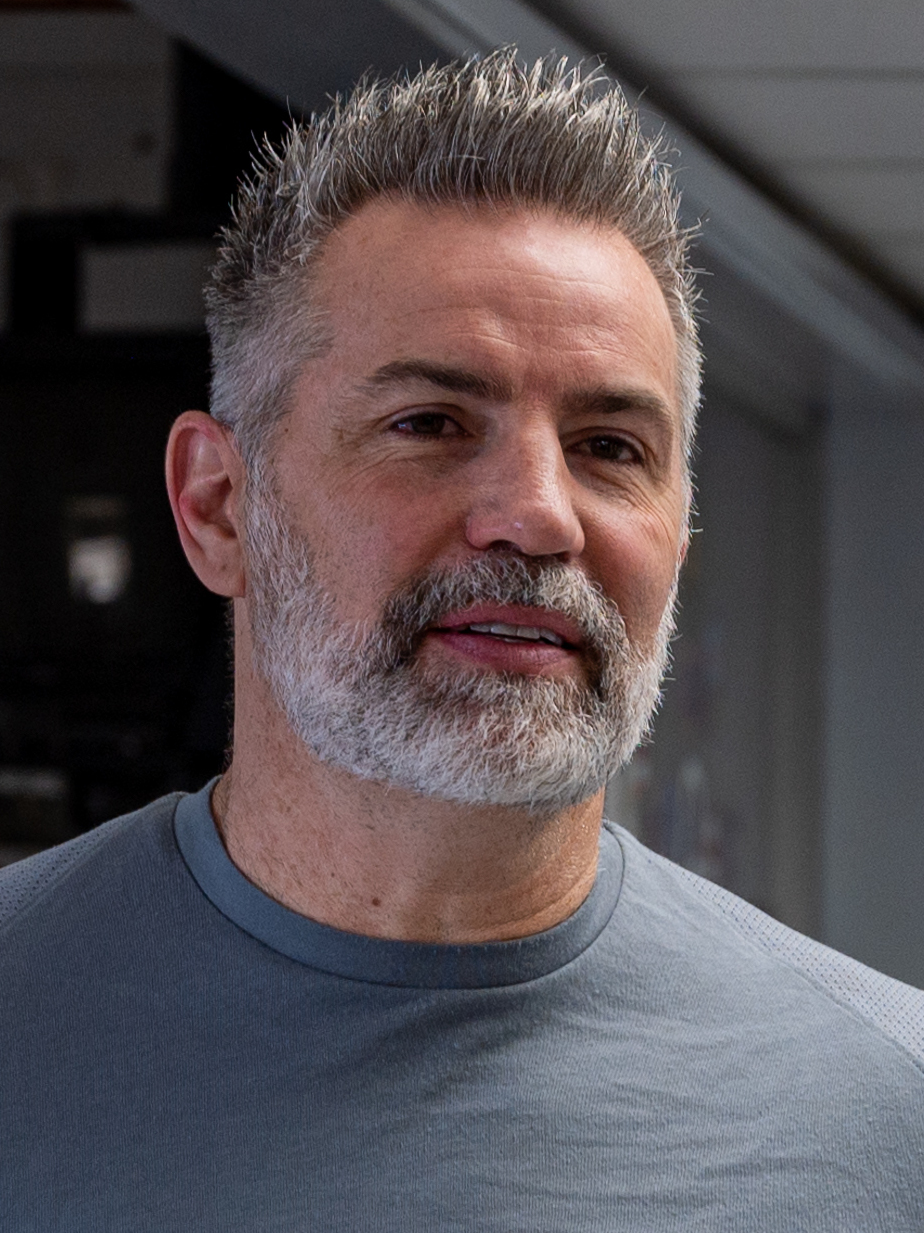
Kurt Warner

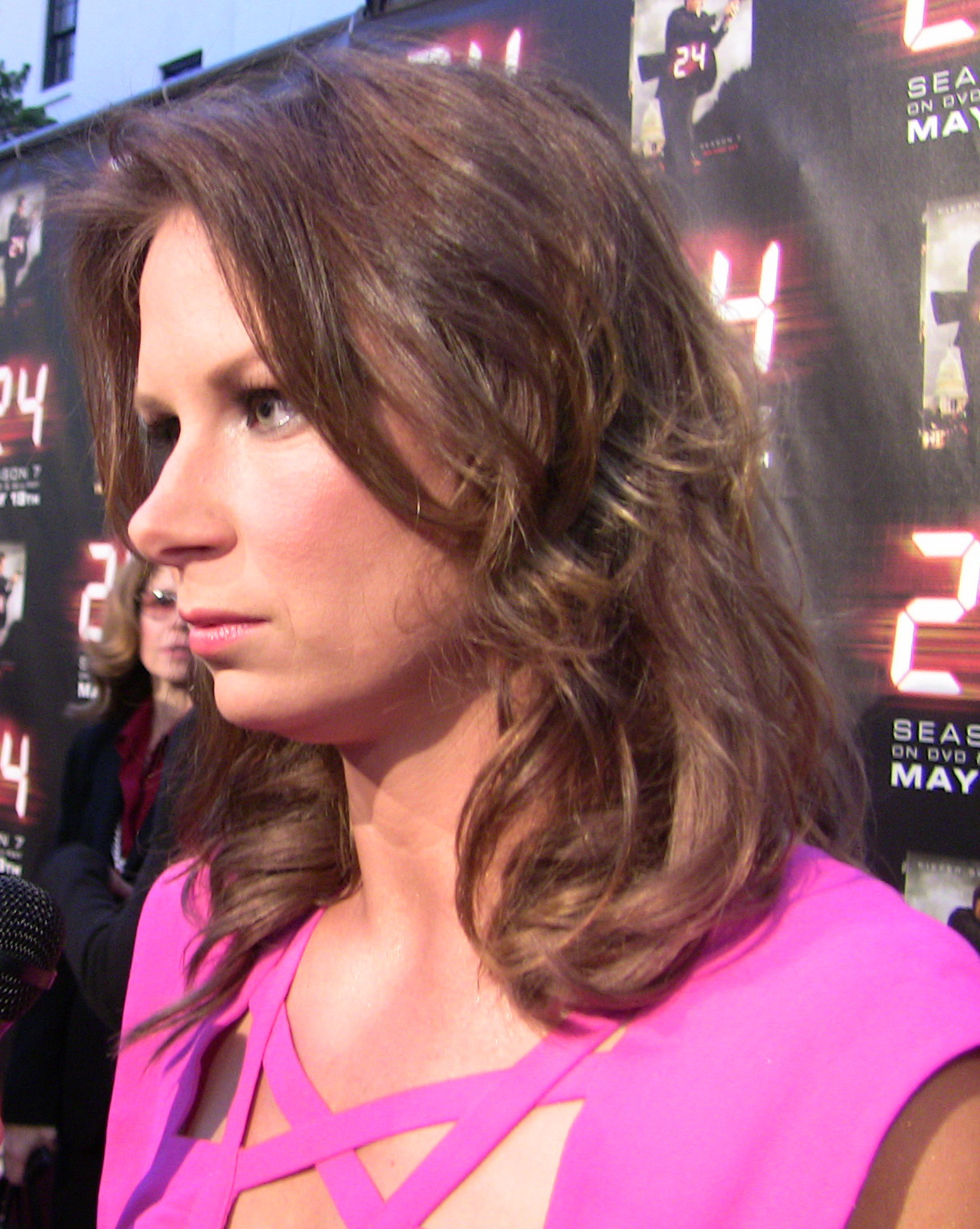
Mary Lynn Rajskub

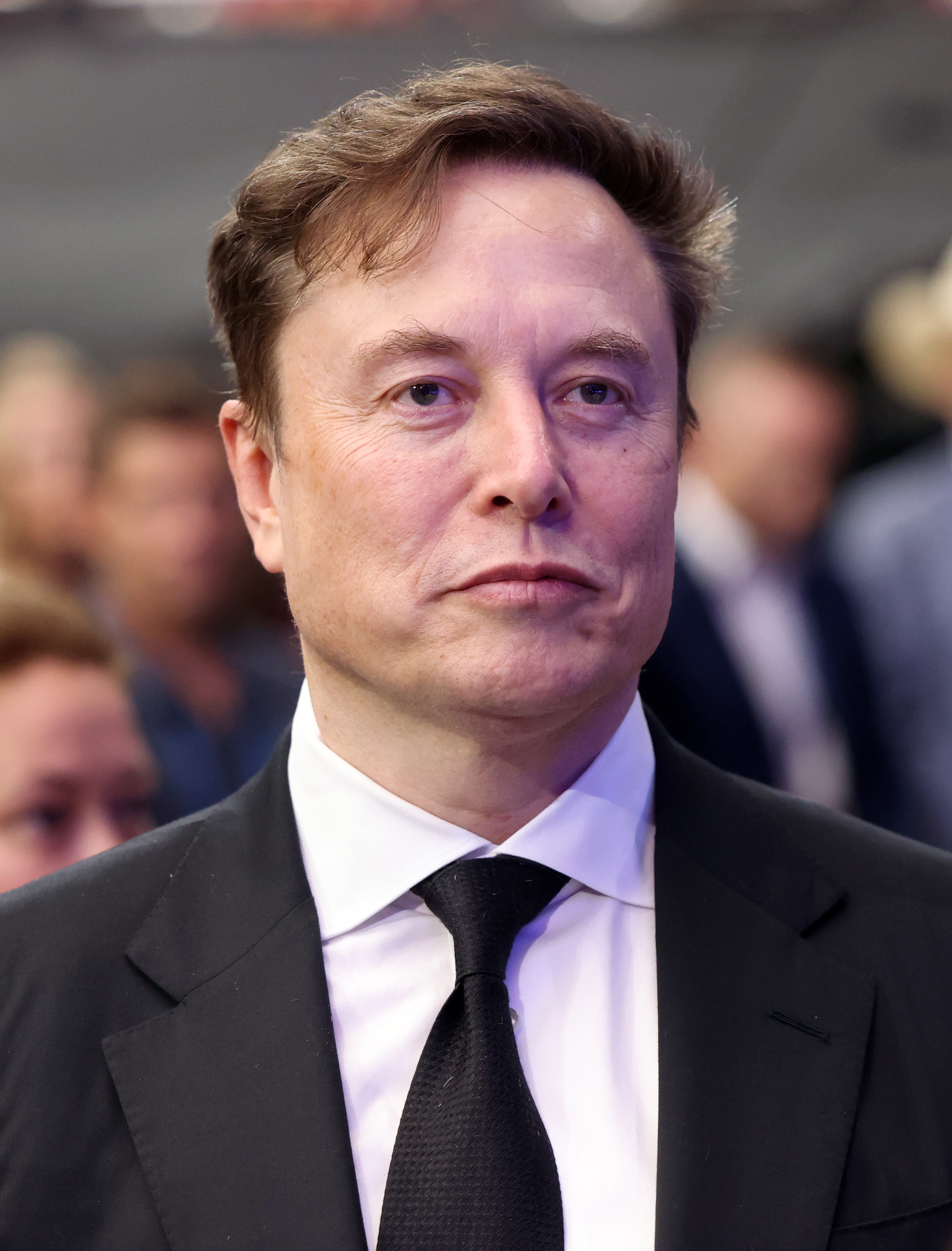
Elon Musk

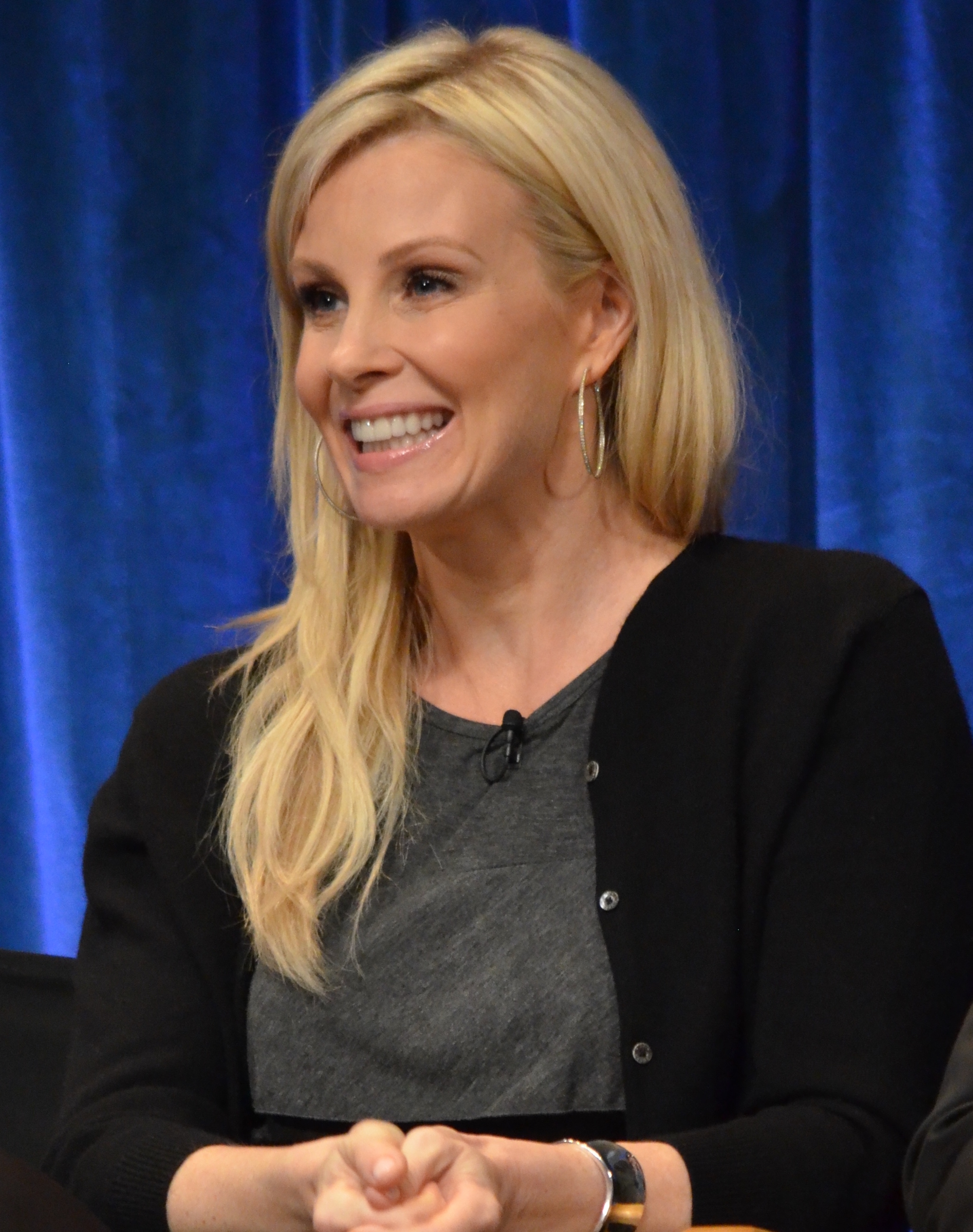
Monica Potter

- June 1
  - Dan Bartlett, political advisor, White House Communications Director (2001–2005) and counselor to George Bush (2005–2007)
  - Cubby Bryant, radio personality
- June 2 – Steve Brooks, football player
- June 3
  - Christine Bakke, LGBT rights activist
  - John Hodgman, actor and writer
- June 4
  - Holly Benson, politician
  - Rob Bryan, politician
  - Mike Lee, politician
  - Stryker, radio personality and disc jockey
  - Noah Wyle, actor
- June 5
  - June Ambrose, Antiguan-born stylist, costume designer, author, creative director, influencer, and television host
  - Robert Melson, murderer (d. 2017)
  - Mark Wahlberg, actor and singer
- June 6 – Joe Lombardi, football coach
- June 7
  - Brian Anderson, sportscaster
  - Terrell Buckley, football player and coach
  - Allan Funk, wrestler
  - Alex Mooney, lawyer and politician
- June 8
  - Chris Estes, bassist
  - Mark Feuerstein, actor, director, and producer
  - Troy Vincent, football player
- June 10
  - Taylor Armstrong, television personality
  - Steve Bigelow, Olympic swimmer
  - Bobby Jindal, politician, 55th Governor of Louisiana (2008–2016)
- June 12
  - MC Breed, rapper (d. 2008)
  - Mark Henry, wrestler
- June 13 – Yang Huang, Chinese-born novelist
- June 14
  - Fred Baxter, football player
  - Bruce Bowen, basketball player
  - Jeff Burlingame, author
- June 15
  - Jimmy Allen, basketball player and coach
  - Dana Bash, journalist and news anchor
  - Jake Busey, actor, musician, and film producer
- June 16
  - Eileen Burbidge, American-born British venture capitalist
  - Jefferson Byrd, politician
  - Tupac Shakur, rapper, poet, actor, and murder victim (d. 1996)
- June 17 – Kiran Ahuja, attorney and director of the United States Office of Personnel Management
- June 18
  - Rohit Aggarwala, environmental policy adviser, transportation planner, historian, and civil servant
  - Lisa Barbuscia, model, singer, and actress
  - Kerry Butler, actress and singer
  - Jen Kiggans, politician
  - Nathan Morris, singer
  - Andy Ogles, politician
- June 19 – Michael Burry, investor, hedge fund manager, and physician
- June 20
  - DJ Funk, music producer and DJ (d. 2025)
  - Josh Lucas, actor
- June 22
  - Brant Brown, baseball player
  - Antonino D'Ambrosio, Italian-born author, filmmaker, producer, and visual artist
  - Mary Lynn Rajskub, actress and comedian
  - Kurt Warner, football player
- June 25
  - Rick Alverson, director, screenwriter, and musician
  - Gary Brown, football player
  - Angela Kinsey, actress
- June 26
  - Greg Blosser, baseball player
  - Chali 2na, painter and rapper
- June 27
  - Yancey Arias, actor
  - Brant Boyer, football player and coach
  - Tod Brown, baseball player and coach
- June 28
  - Andy Blitz, comedian, writer, producer, and actor
  - Van Burnham, writer, designer, producer, and curator
  - Benito Martinez, actor
  - Elon Musk, South African-born entrepreneur and investor, founder of SpaceX and Tesla, Inc., and head of the Department of Government Efficiency
  - Aileen Quinn, actress
- June 29
  - Kaitlyn Ashley, pornographic actress
  - Carlo Basile, politician
  - David Blair, tennis player
- June 30
  - Aaron Gunches, convicted murderer (executed 2025)
  - Monica Potter, actress
  - Paul Tremblay, author and editor

=== July ===
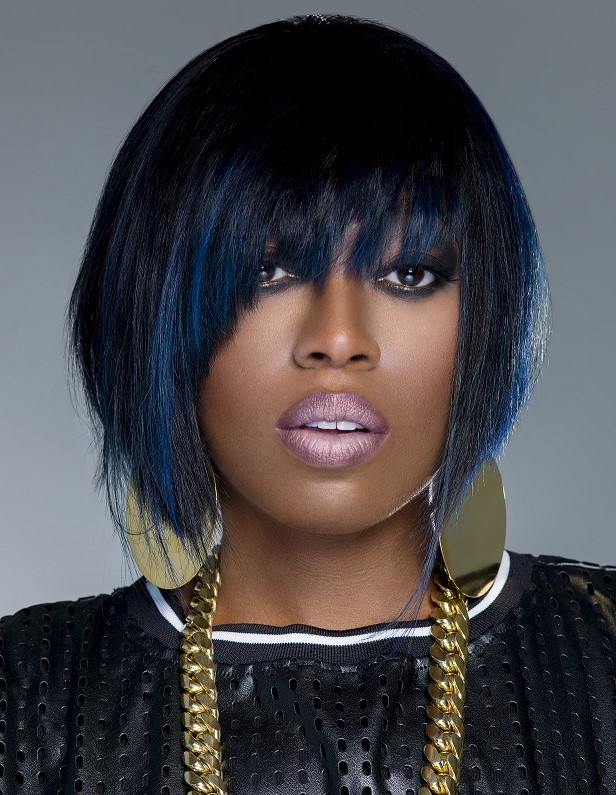
Missy Elliott

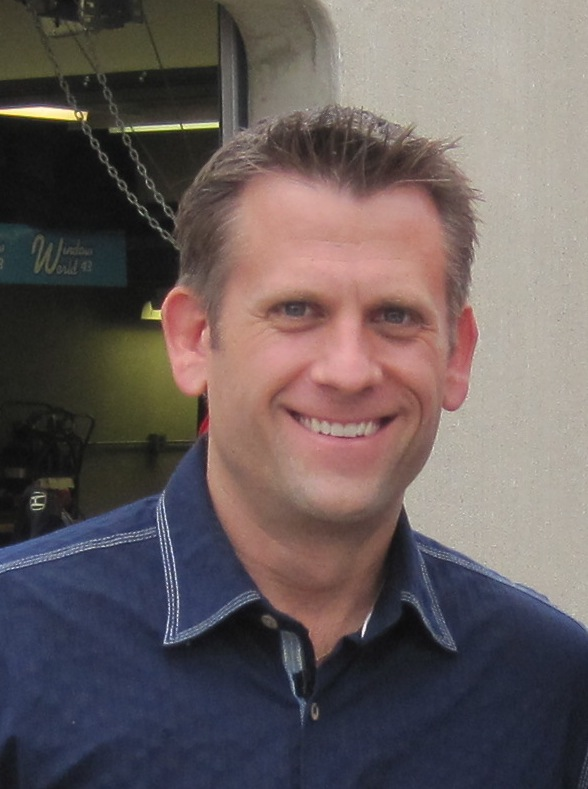
John Brenkus

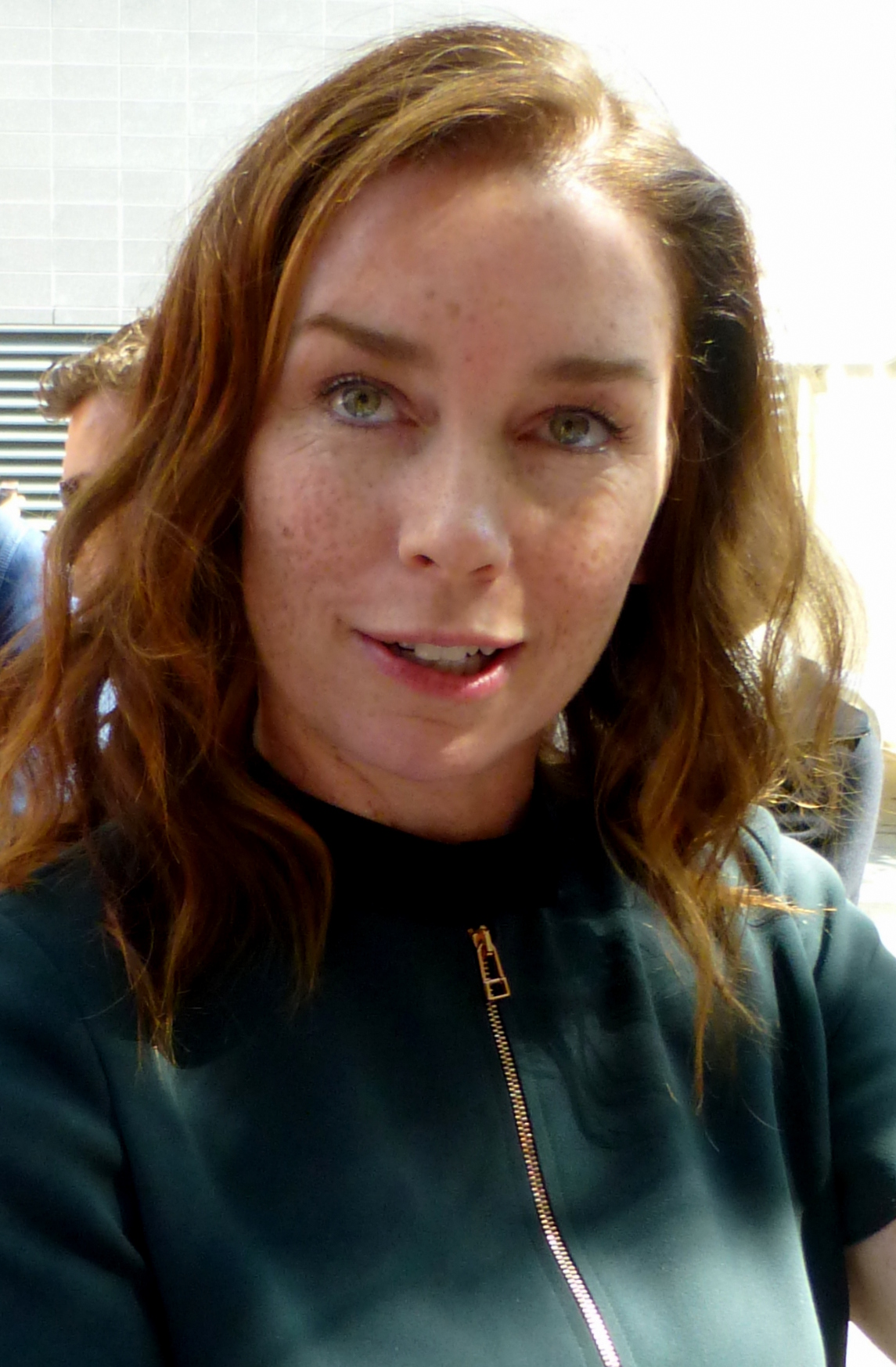
Julianne Nicholson

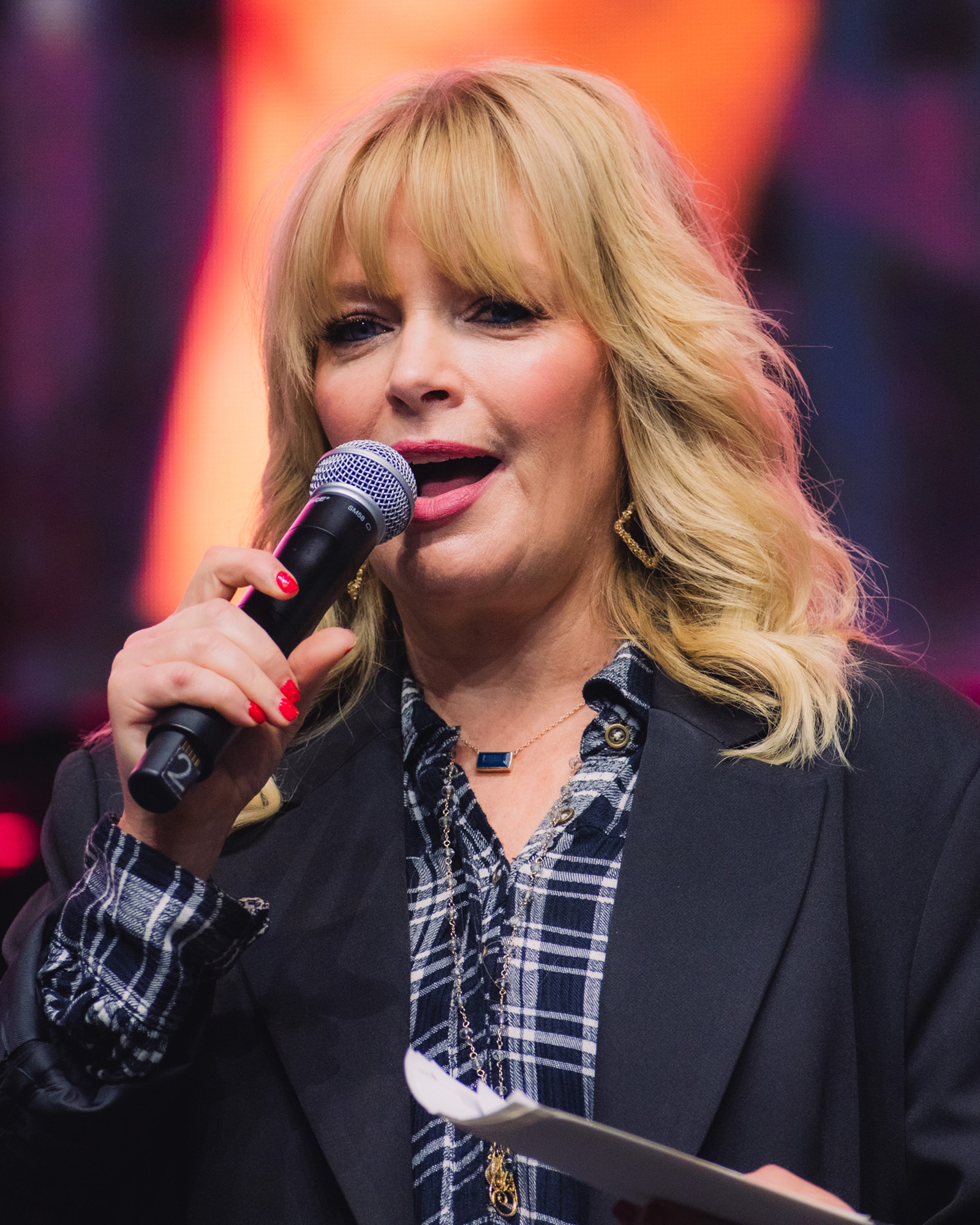
Melissa Peterman

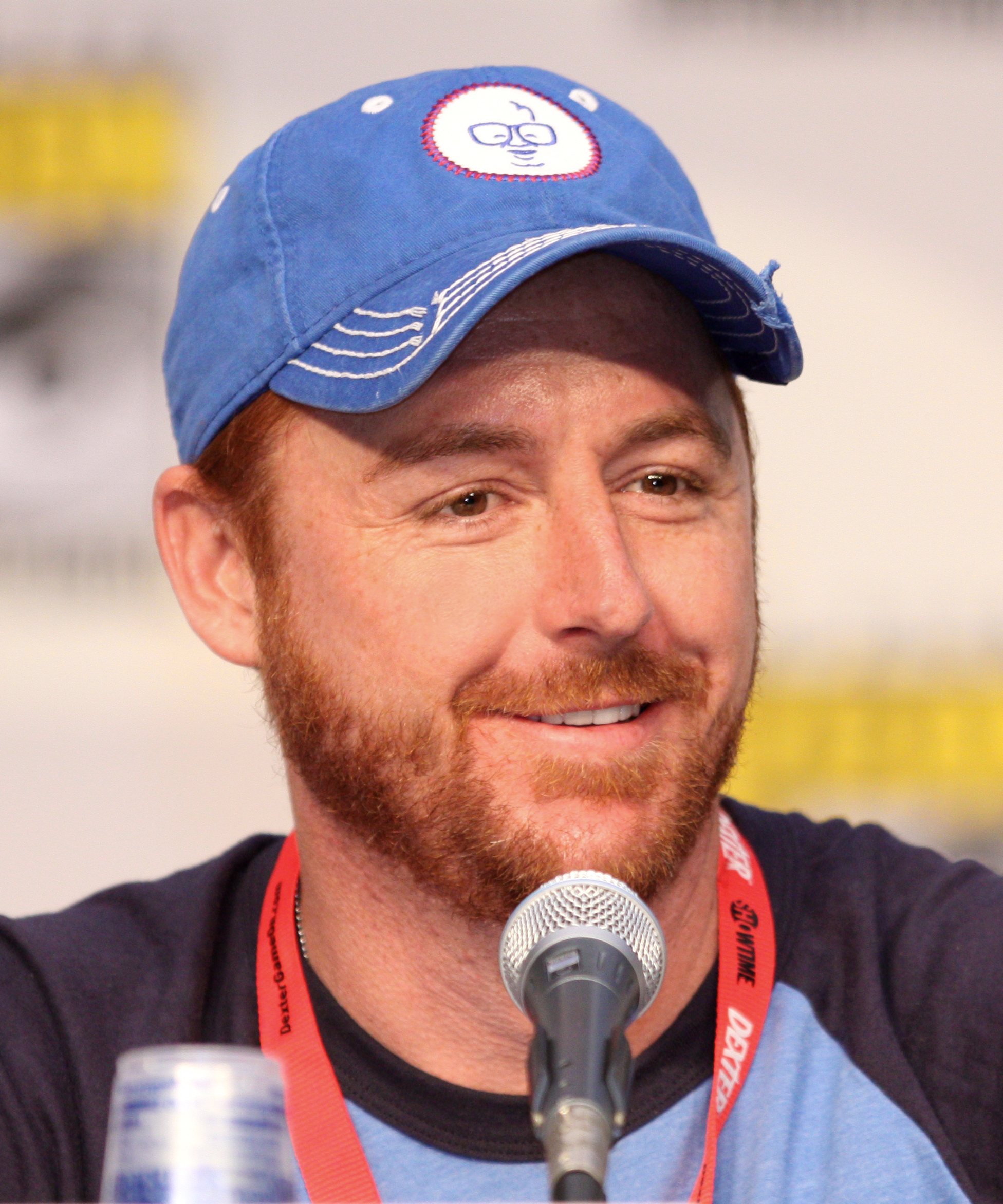
Scott Grimes

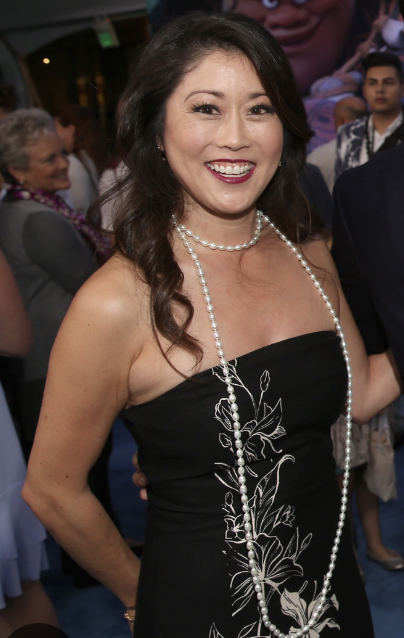
Kristi Yamaguchi

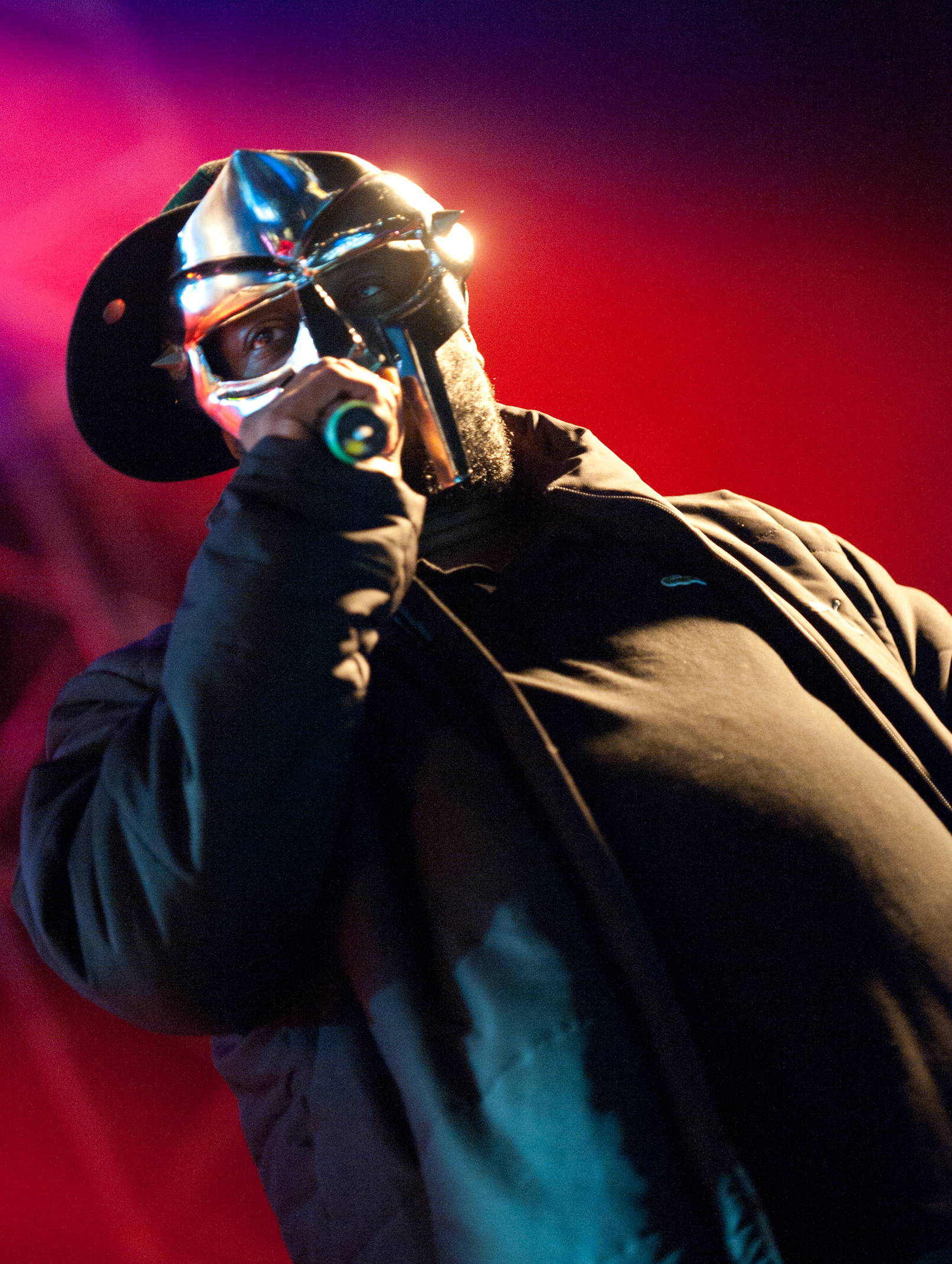
MF Doom

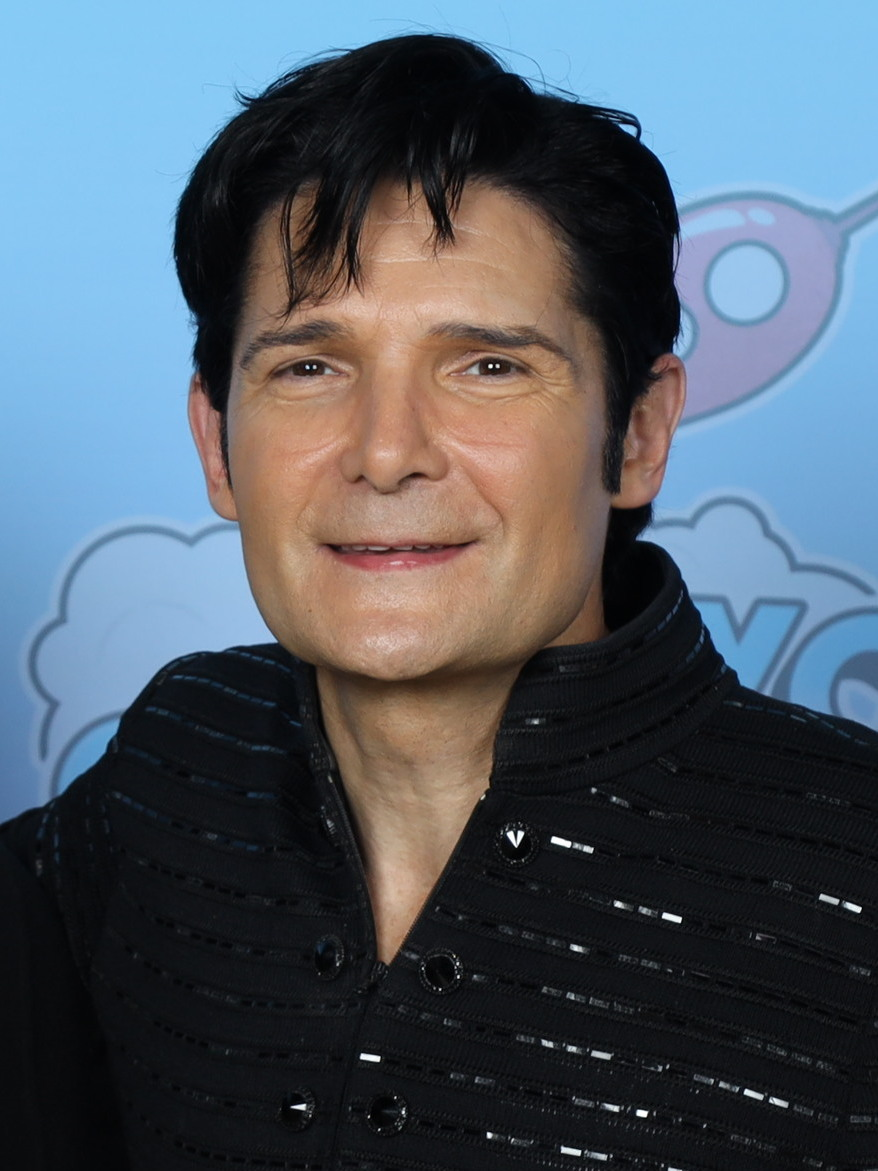
Corey Feldman

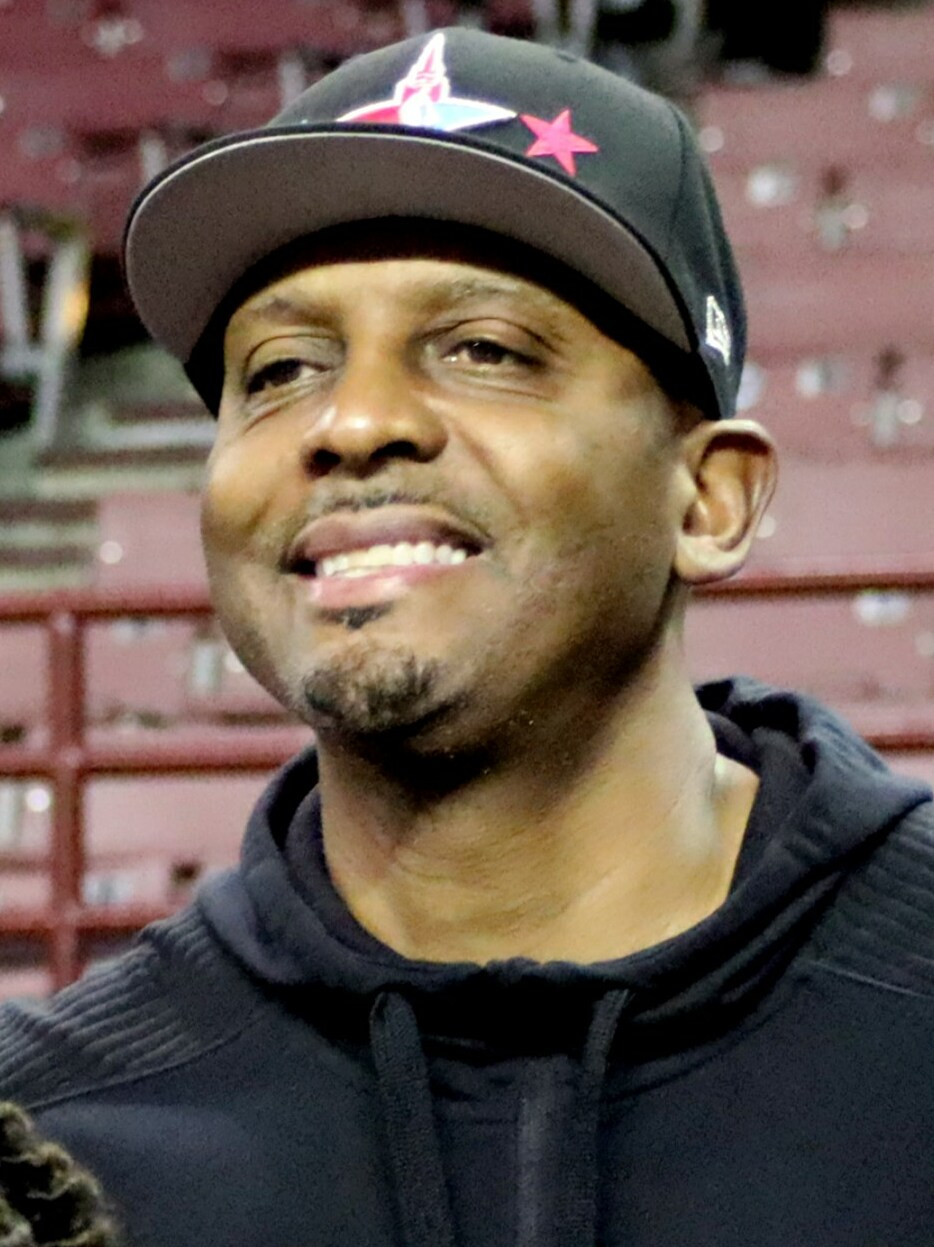
Penny Hardaway

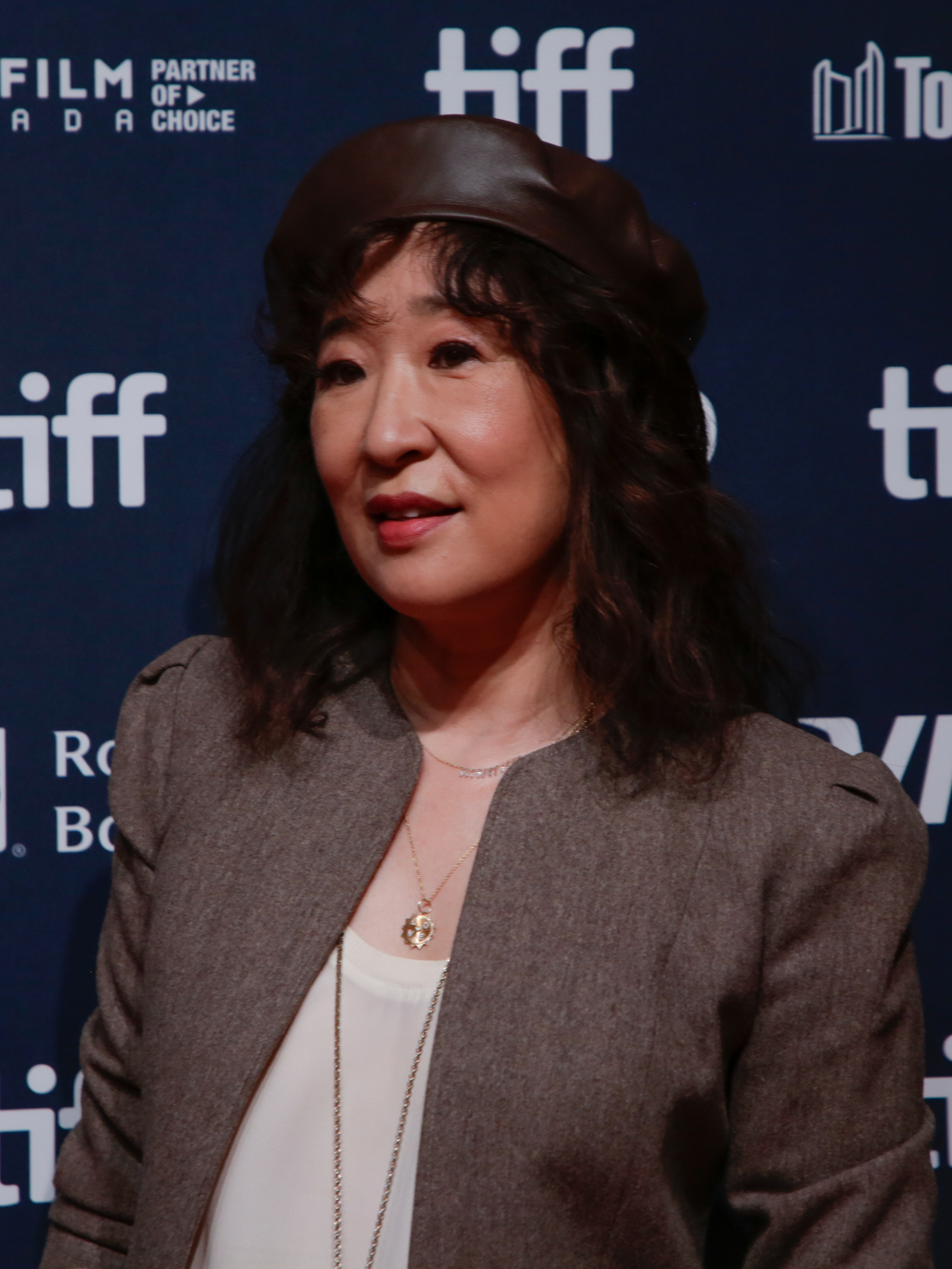
Sandra Oh

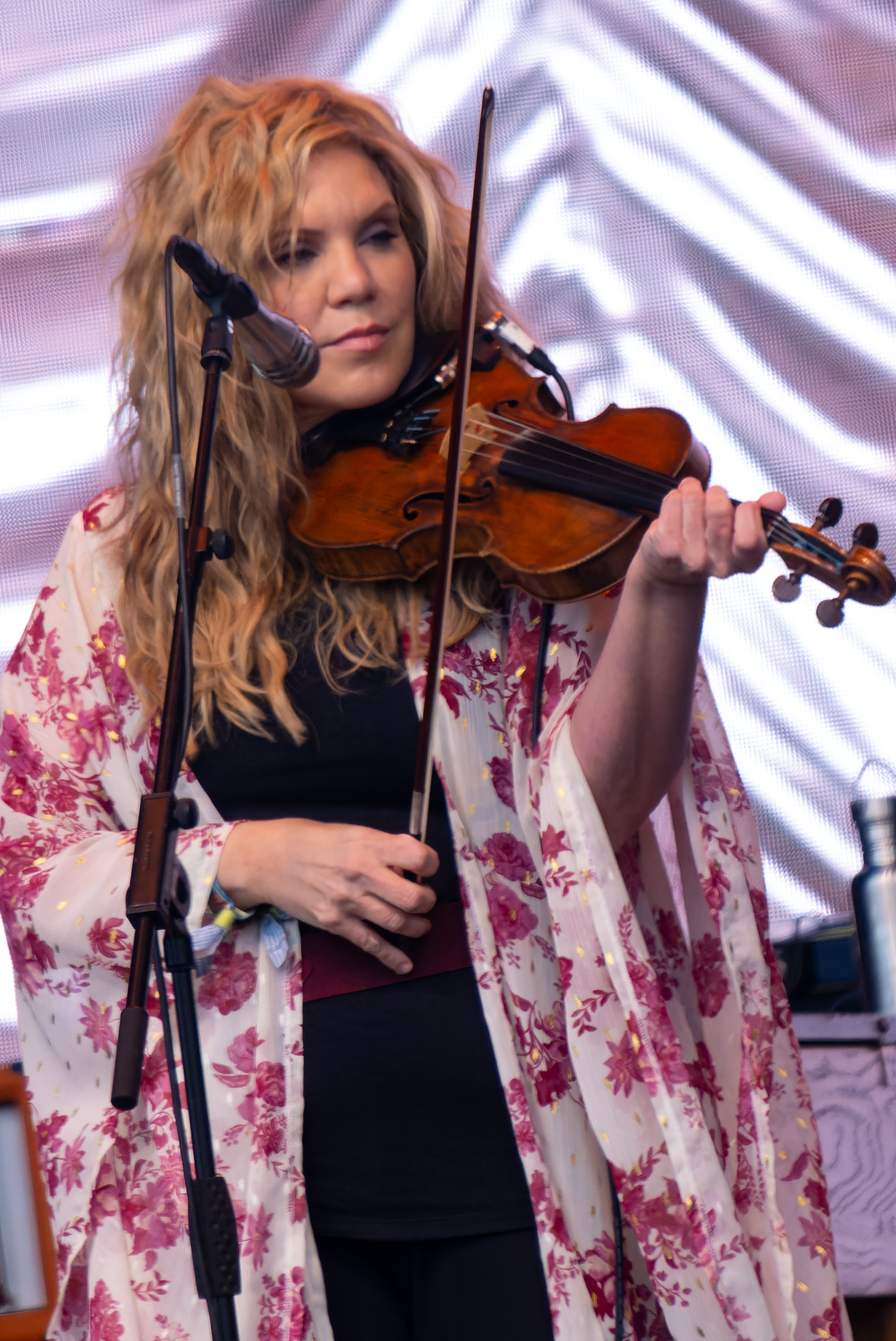
Alison Krauss

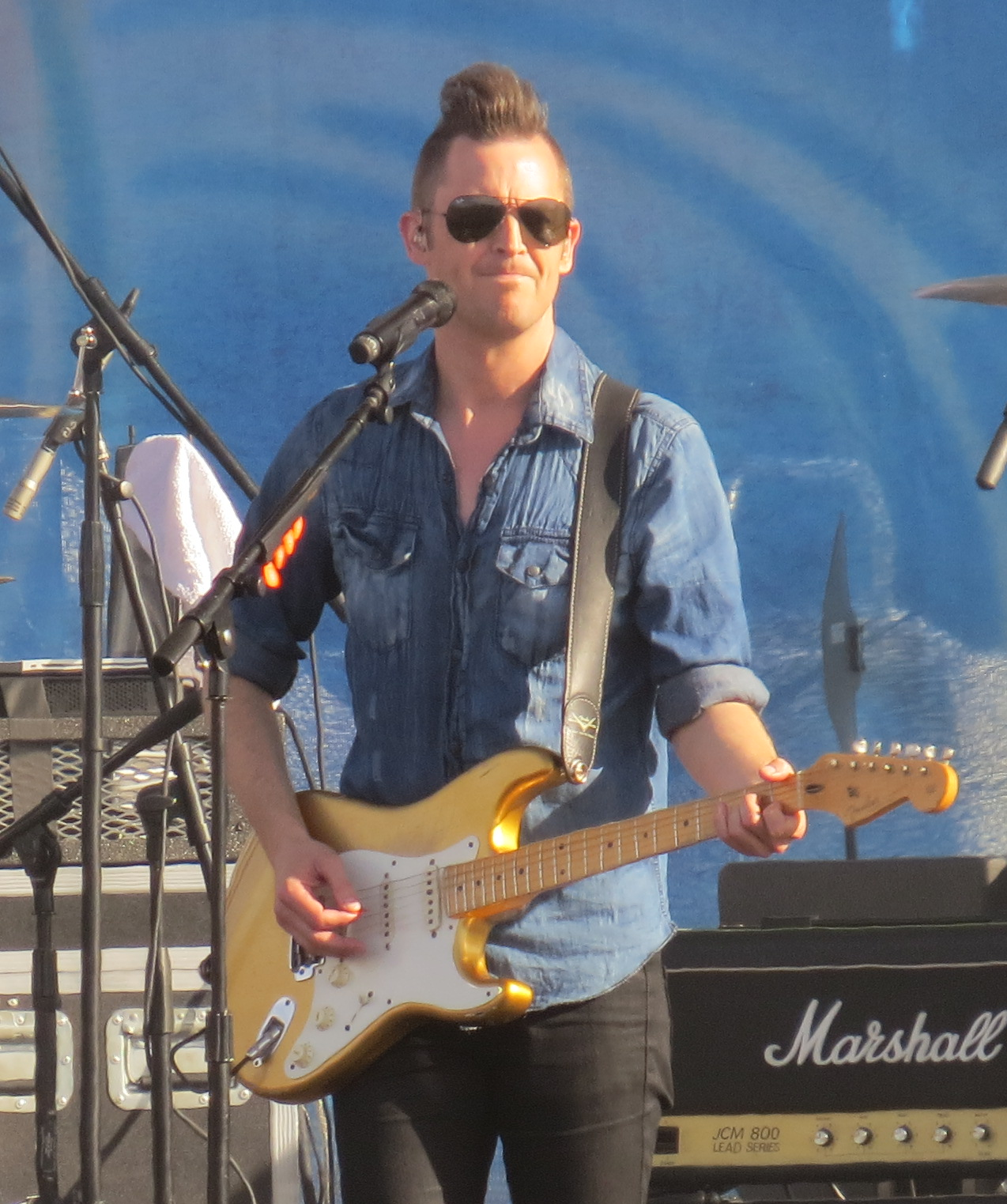
Lincoln Brewster

- July 1
  - Steven W. Bailey, actor
  - Missy Elliott, singer
  - Julianne Nicholson, actress
  - Melissa Peterman, actress and comedian
- July 2
  - Joel Adamson, baseball player
  - Christina Bohannan, politician and law professor
  - John Brenkus, television producer and presenter (d. 2025)
  - Troy Brown, football player and coach
- July 3 – Beans, rapper
- July 4 – Al Madrigal, comedian, writer, actor and producer
- July 5 – J. C. Ice, Australian-born wrestler
- July 7
  - Leslie Acosta, politician
  - Colin Alevras, restaurateur (d. 2022)
  - Stephanie Arnold, author
  - Christian Camargo, actor, producer, writer, and director
- July 8
  - Wendy Benson, actress
  - Scott Grimes, actor
  - John Juanda, Indonesian-born poker player
- July 9 – Marc Andreessen, software engineer and entrepreneur
- July 10
  - Brent Alexander, football player
  - Jeffrey Angles, American-born Japanese poet
  - Cassius F. Butts, businessman
  - J-Diggs, rapper
  - Jennifer A. Nielsen, author
  - Aaron D. Spears, actor
- July 11 – Brett Hauer, ice hockey player
- July 12
  - Kristi Yamaguchi, Olympic figure skater
  - Loni Love, comedian
- July 13
  - Rich Aude, baseball player
  - Raul Bocanegra, politician
  - Jason Danieley, actor, singer, concert performer and recording artist
  - MF Doom, rapper (d. 2020)
  - Craig Elliott, illustrator
- July 14
  - Sean Alvarez, mixed martial artist
  - Mark LoMonaco, wrestler
  - Joey Styles, wrestling announcer
- July 15
  - James Baldwin, baseball player
  - Sandon Berg, actor, producer, and screenwriter
  - Jim Rash, actor
- July 16
  - Del Alexander, football player and coach
  - Corey Feldman, actor
  - Ed Kowalczyk, singer/songwriter
- July 17 – Machelle Hackney Hobson, former YouTube personality (d. 2019)
- July 18
  - Penny Hardaway, basketball player
  - Joseph Russo, director
- July 19
  - Russell Allen, singer and frontman for Symphony X
  - Carrie A. Buck, educator and politician
  - Andrew Kavovit, actor
- July 20
  - William DeMeo, actor, producer, director and writer
  - Ed Henry, journalist and television host
  - Sandra Oh, Canadian-born actress
  - DJ Screw, hip hop DJ (d. 2000)
- July 22
  - William Bell, football player
  - Benny Boom, director
  - Kristine Lilly, soccer player
  - Aaron McCargo Jr., chef, TV personality, and TV show host
  - Z-Trip, DJ and producer
- July 23
  - Tobias Adrian, German-born economist
  - Steven D. Binder, screenwriter and producer
  - Cara-Beth Burnside, skateboarder and Olympic snowboarder
  - Alison Krauss, country singer
  - Scott Krippayne, Christian musician
- July 24
  - A. J. Baime, author, journalist, and public speaker
  - Mike Bocchino, politician
- July 25 – Billy Wagner, baseball player
- July 26
  - Chris Bell, poker player
  - Reggie Carthon, football player
- July 27 – Shane Bowers, baseball player
- July 28
  - Stephen Lynch, comedian, musician, and actor
  - Jeffrey S. Williams, journalist and author
- July 29
  - Big DS, rapper (d. 2003)
  - Monica Calhoun, actress
- July 30
  - Victor Alfieri, Italian-born actor and writer
  - Ron Blazier, baseball player (d. 2021)
  - Lincoln Brewster, Christian singer/songwriter
  - Christine Taylor, actress

=== August ===
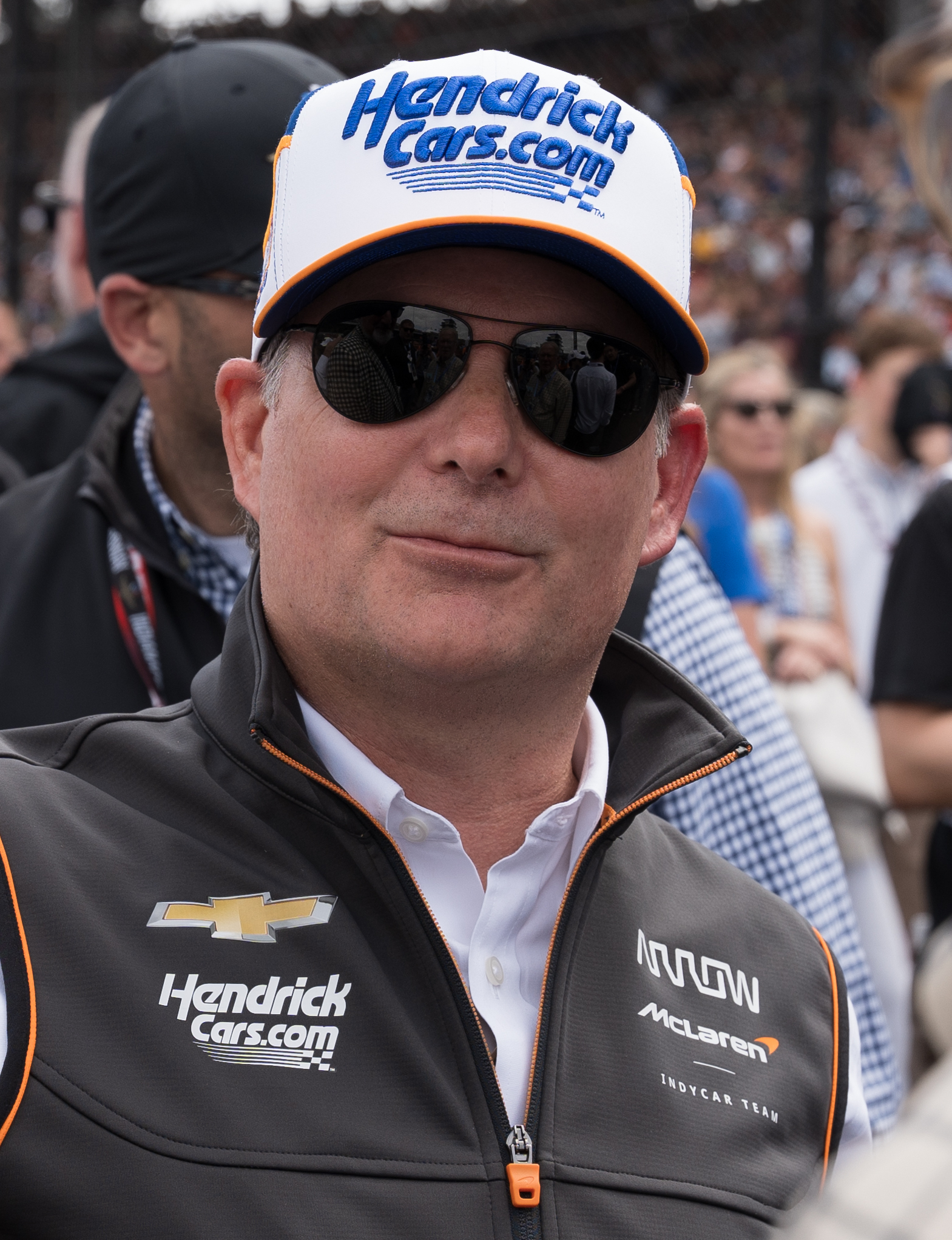
Jeff Gordon

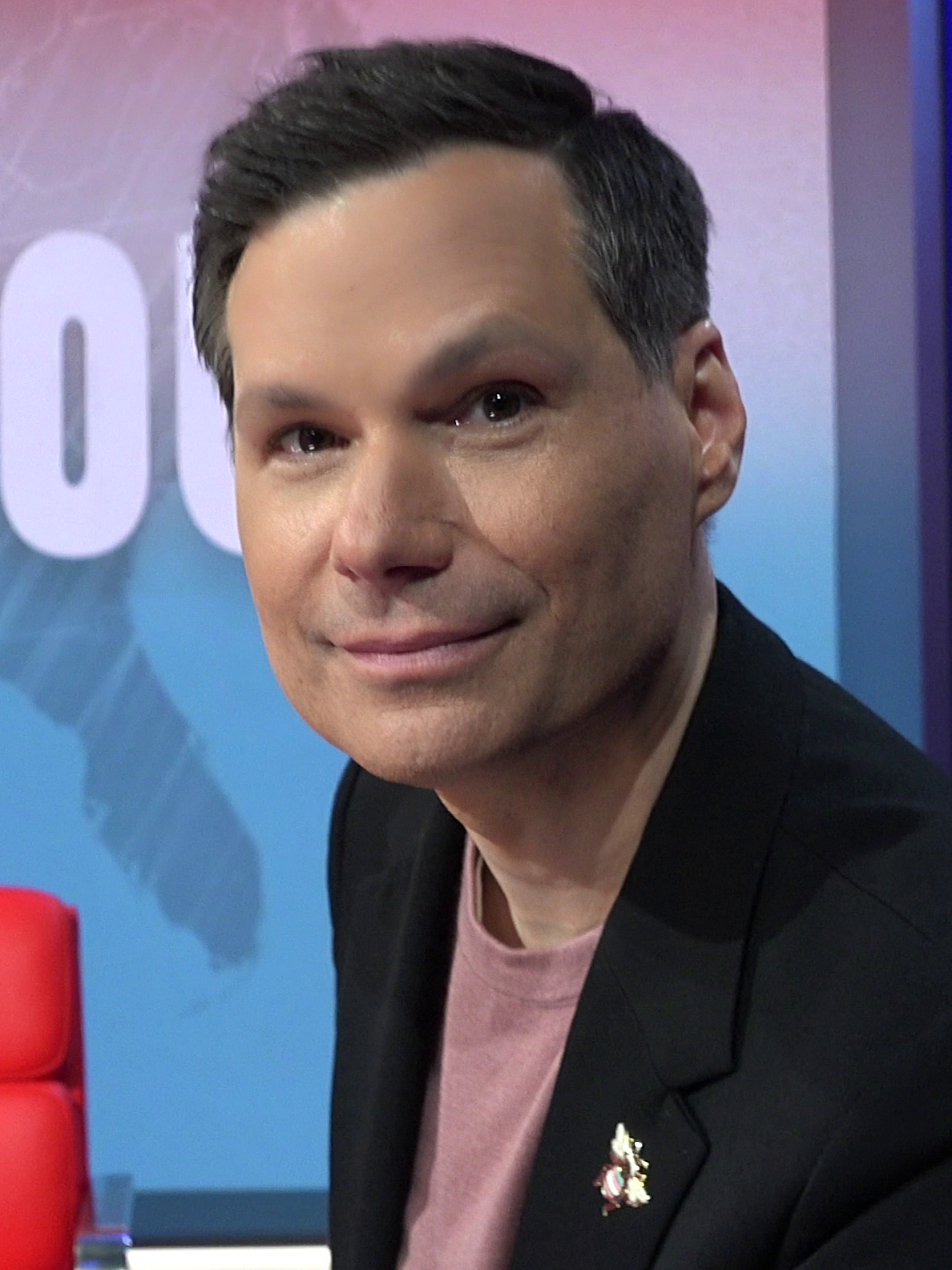
Michael Ian Black

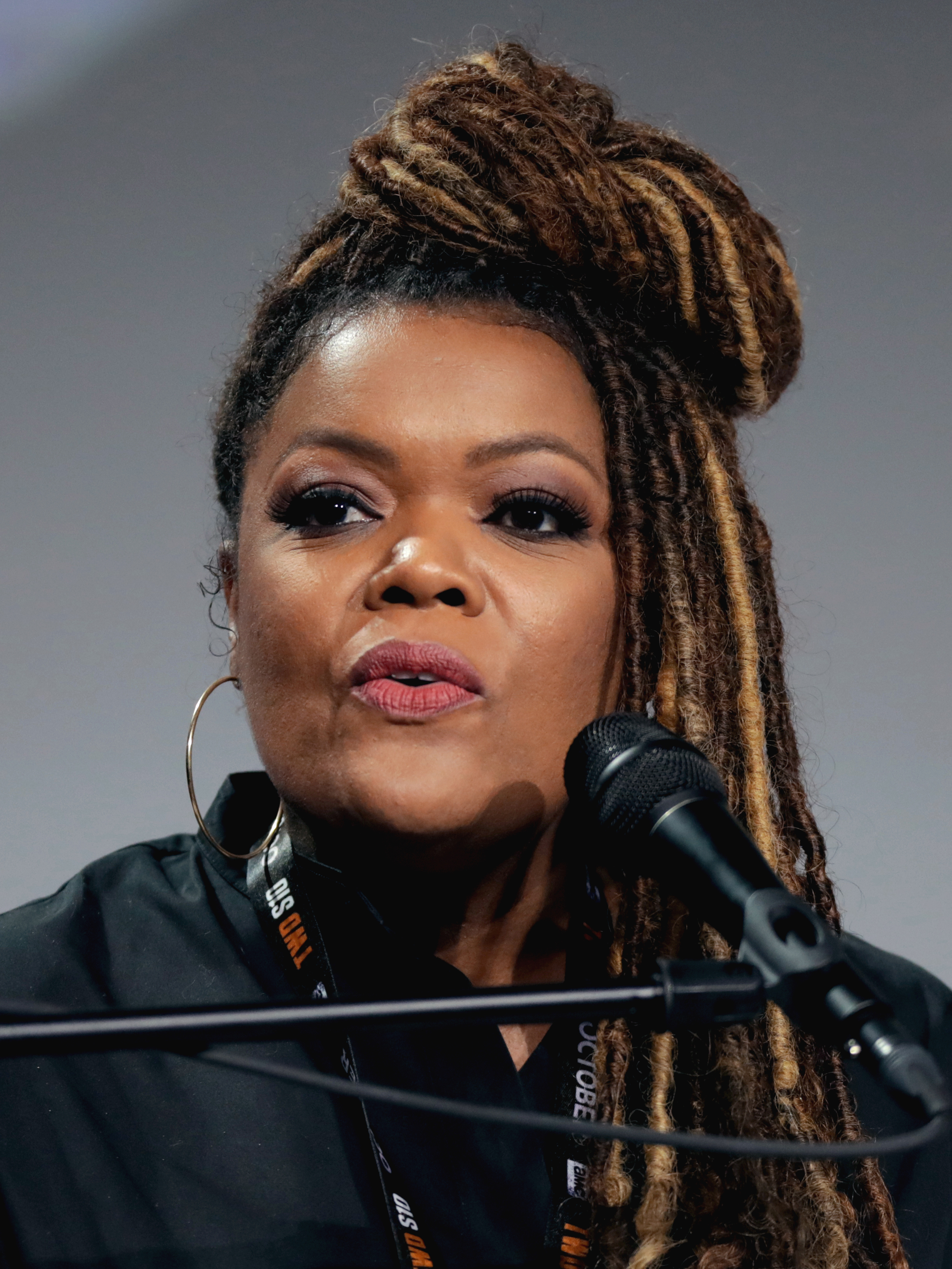
Yvette Nicole Brown

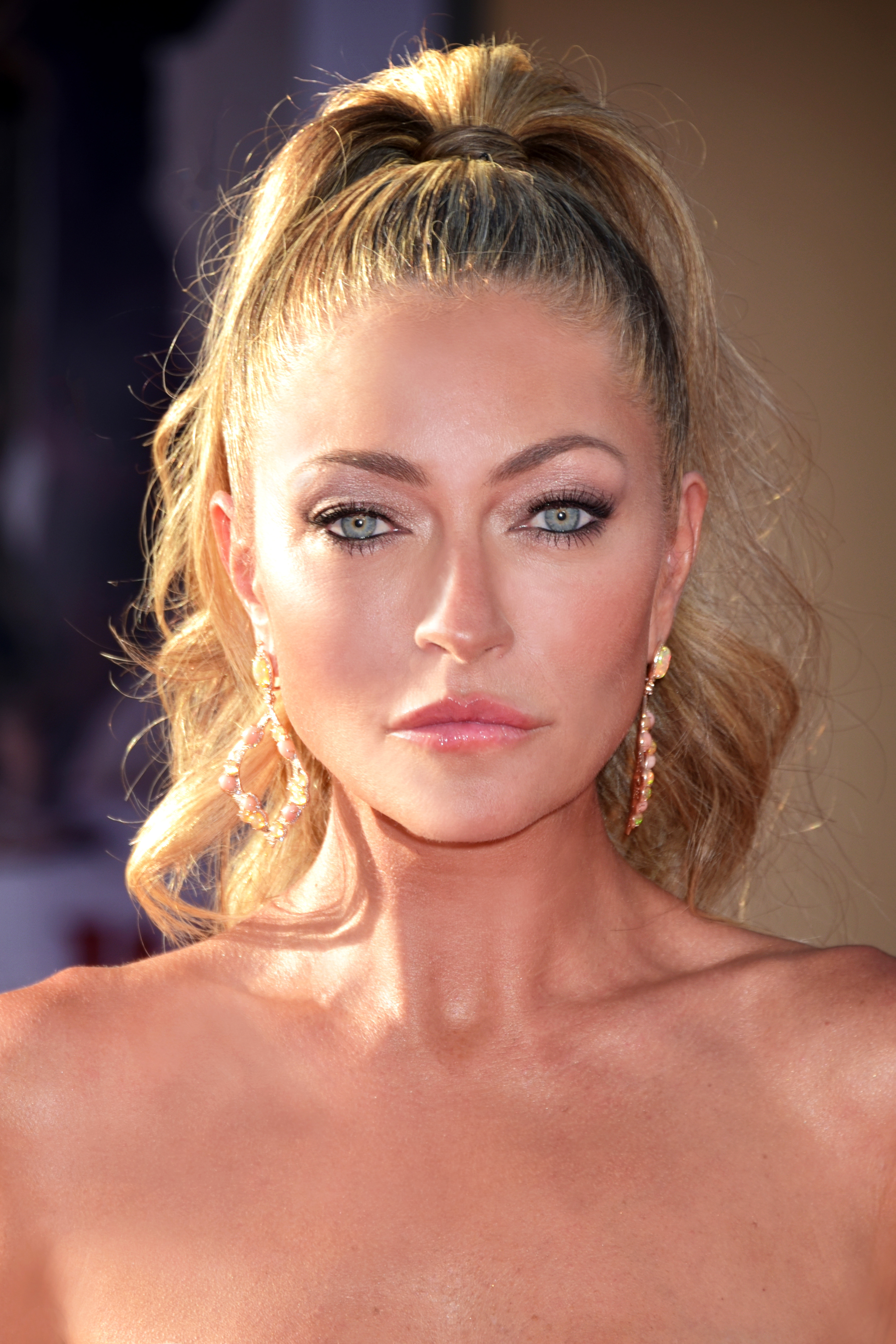
Rebecca Gayheart

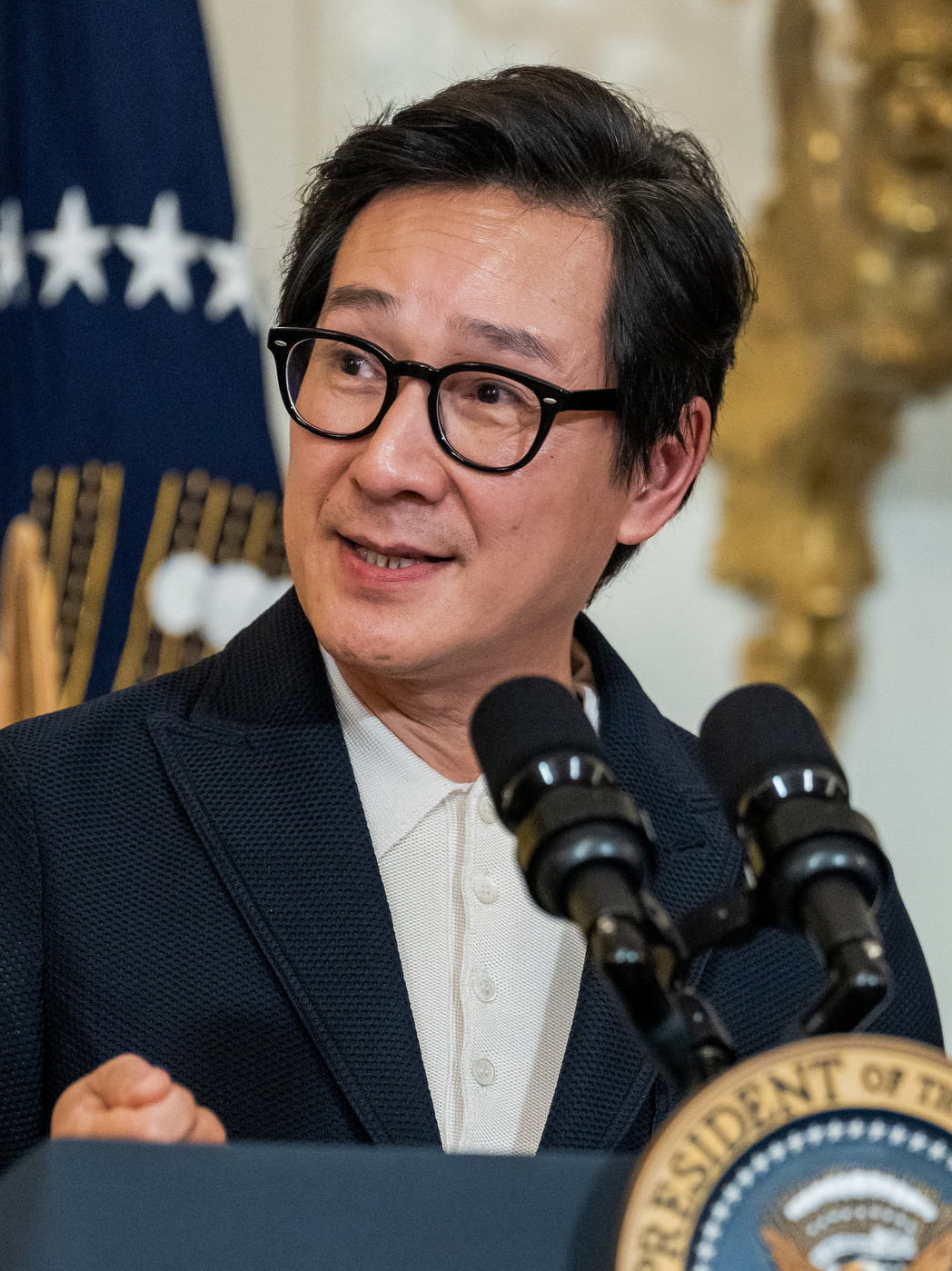
Ke Huy Quan

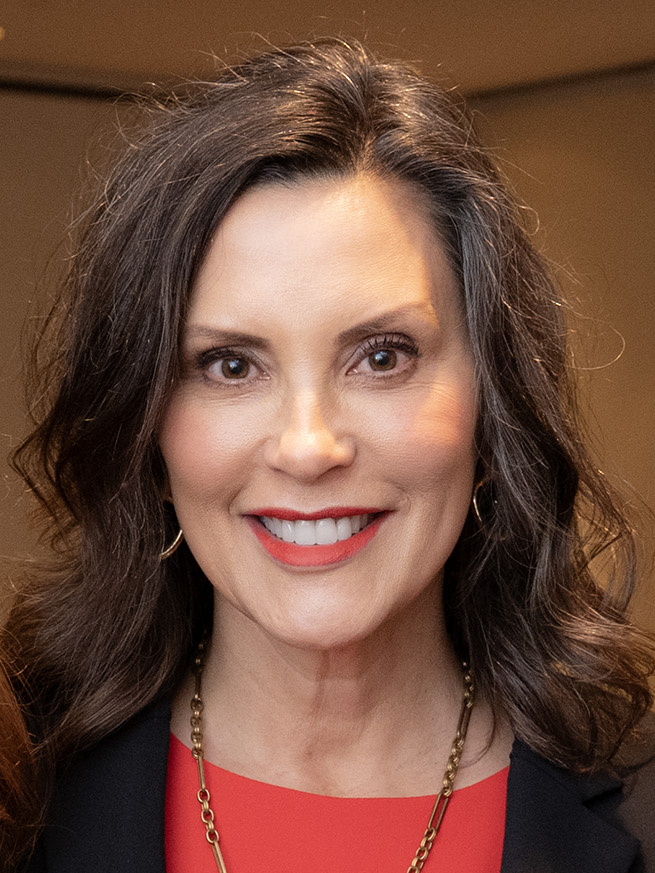
Gretchen Whitmer

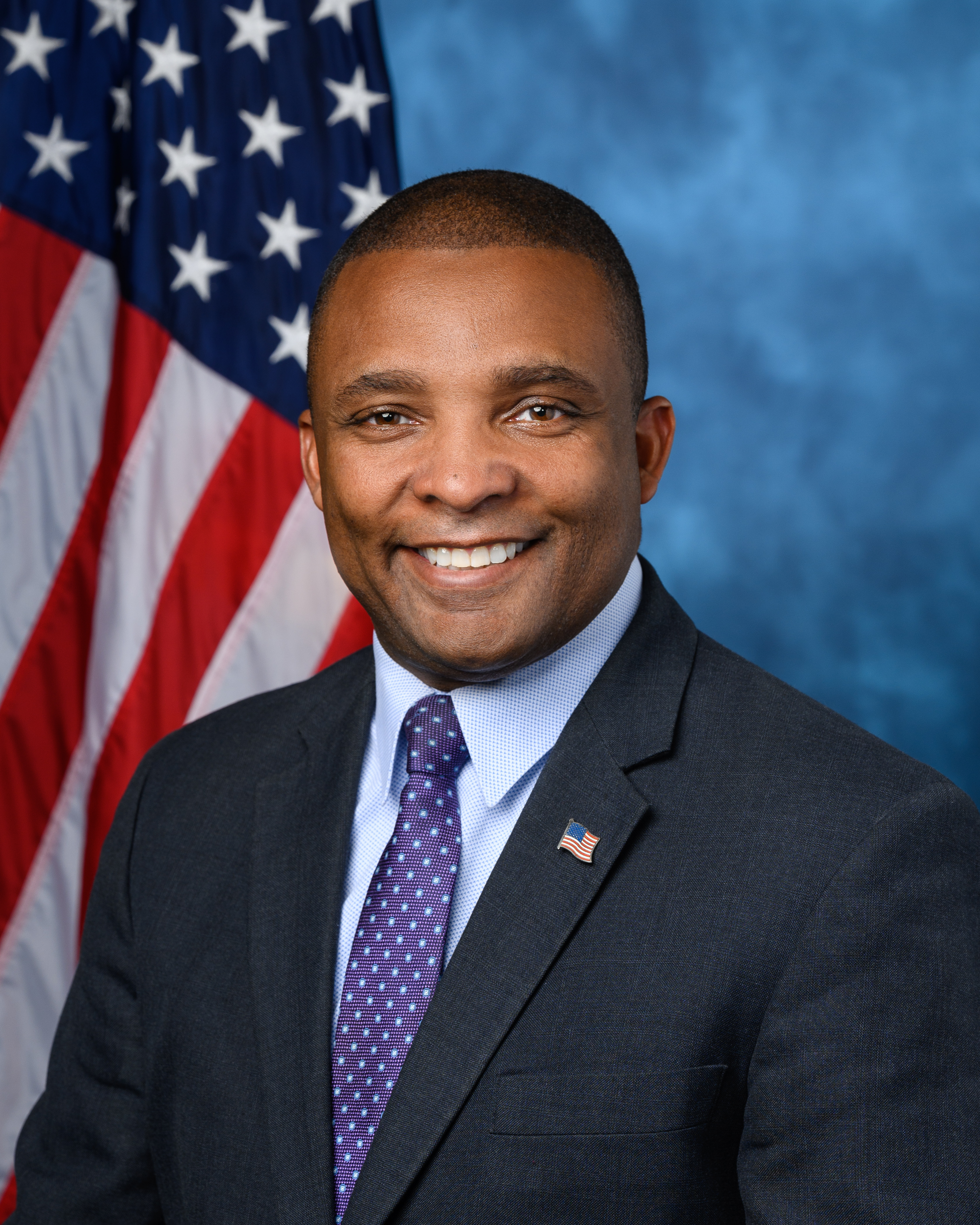
Don Davis

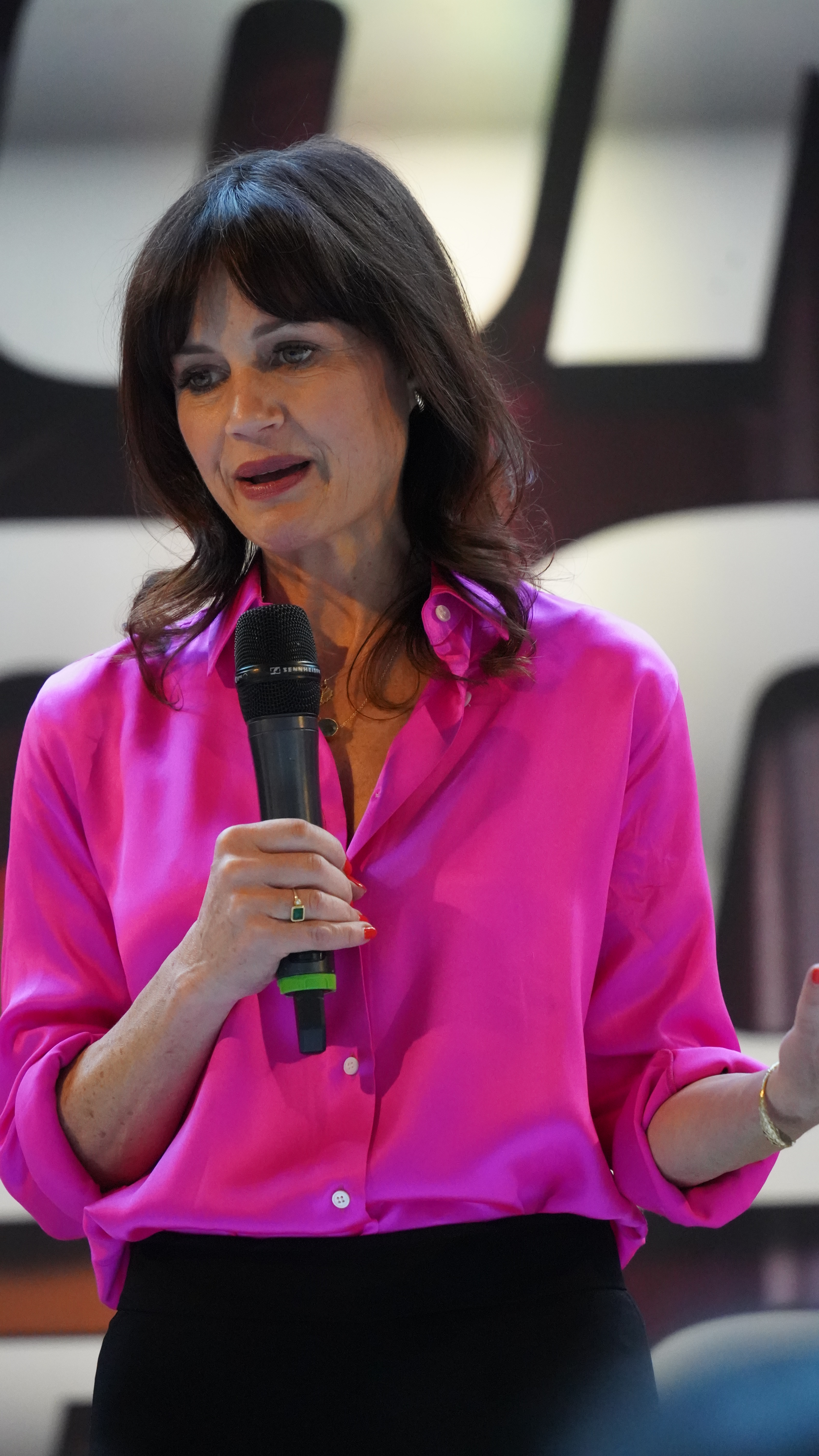
Carla Gugino

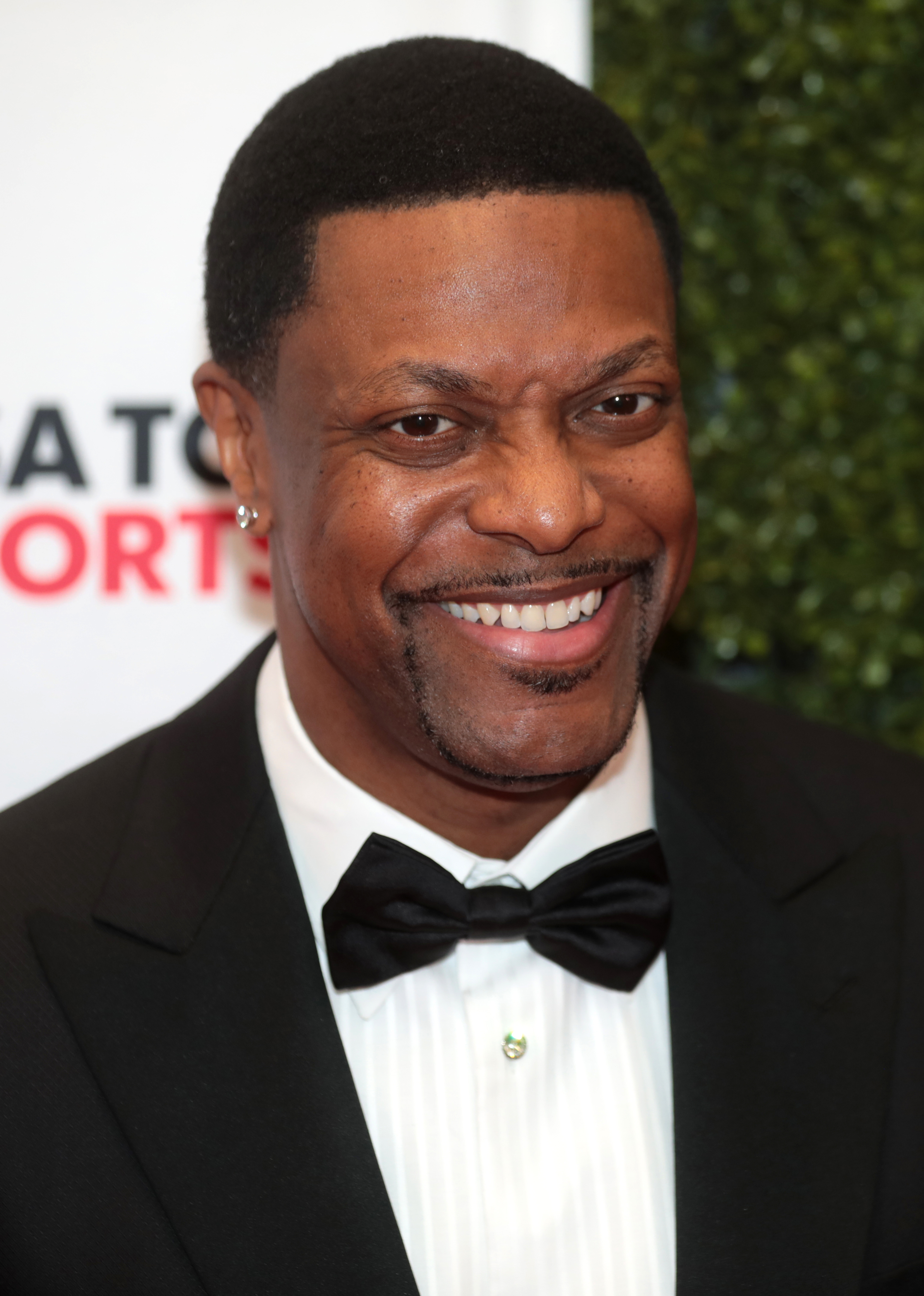
Chris Tucker

- August 1 – Travis Driskill, baseball player
- August 2 – Rebecca Bradley, lawyer and judge
- August 3
  - Ali Brown, businesswoman, author, speaker, and television commentator
  - Lucas Brunelle, videographer
- August 4
  - Jeff Gordon, race car driver
  - Yo-Yo, rapper
- August 5
  - George T. Alexander, United States Army staff sergeant and Iraqi War veteran (d. 2005)
  - Eric Bernotas, Olympic skeleton racer
  - Evil Jared Hasselhoff, bassist for Bloodhound Gang
- August 6 – Ed Cash, gospel musician
- August 8 – Joe Burch, football player
- August 9
  - Dallen Bounds, serial killer (d. 1999)
  - James Kim, television personality and technology analyst (d. 2006)
- August 10
  - Tony Barbee, basketball player and coach
  - Kevin Randleman, mixed martial artist (d. 2016)
  - Justin Theroux, actor
- August 11
  - Charles Adair, soccer player and coach
  - Ryneldi Becenti, basketball player
  - Christine D'Ercole, track cyclist, Peloton fitness instructor, and public speaker
  - Dave Witte, drummer
- August 12
  - Michael Ian Black, actor and comedian
  - Yvette Nicole Brown, actress and comedian
  - Rebecca Gayheart, actress and model
  - Pete Sampras, tennis player
- August 13
  - Jeremy Bash, lawyer, CIA chief of staff (2009–2011), and DOD chief of staff (2011–2013)
  - Vernell Brown Jr., jazz musician
  - Adam Housley, journalist, winemaker, and basketball player
- August 14
  - Walter Blanding, jazz musician
  - Chris Nelloms, sprinter
- August 16
  - Brent Brekke, ice hockey player and coach
  - Chris Brown, English-born soccer player
- August 17 – Brendan Bell, American-born Canadian politician
- August 18
  - Kevin Bouie, football player
  - Greg Butler, visual effects supervisor
  - Jacob Vargas, actor
- August 19
  - Kevin Abrams, Canadian-born football executive
  - Mary Joe Fernández, tennis player
- August 20
  - Brett Bech, football player
  - Ke Huy Quan, Vietnamese-born actor
- August 21 – Megan Abbott, author
- August 22 – Troy E. Brown, politician
- August 23
  - Bone Crusher, rapper
  - Erik Stolhanske, actor, writer, and producer
  - Gretchen Whitmer, politician, 49th Governor of Michigan
- August 24
  - Becky Bell, girl who died of complications from a septic abortion
  - Michael Brune, environmentalist
  - Evers Burns, basketball player
- August 25
  - Douglas Brunt, novelist, historian, and podcast host
  - Crash Holly, wrestler (d. 2003)
- August 26
  - Dion Bentley, long jumper
  - Robert Bollt, archaeologist (d. 2010)
  - Jocelyn Borgella, Bahamian-born football player
- August 28
  - Shane Andrews, baseball player
  - Janet Evans, Olympic swimmer
- August 29
  - Mark Bomback, screenwriter
  - Don Davis, politician
  - Carla Gugino, actress
- August 30
  - Aubrey Beavers, football player
  - Jon Blais, triatlete (d. 2007)
  - Jeff Bowen, composer, lyricist, and actor
- August 31
  - Luke Brookshier, animator, storyboard artist, screenwriter, and director
  - Chris Tucker, actor and comedian

=== September ===
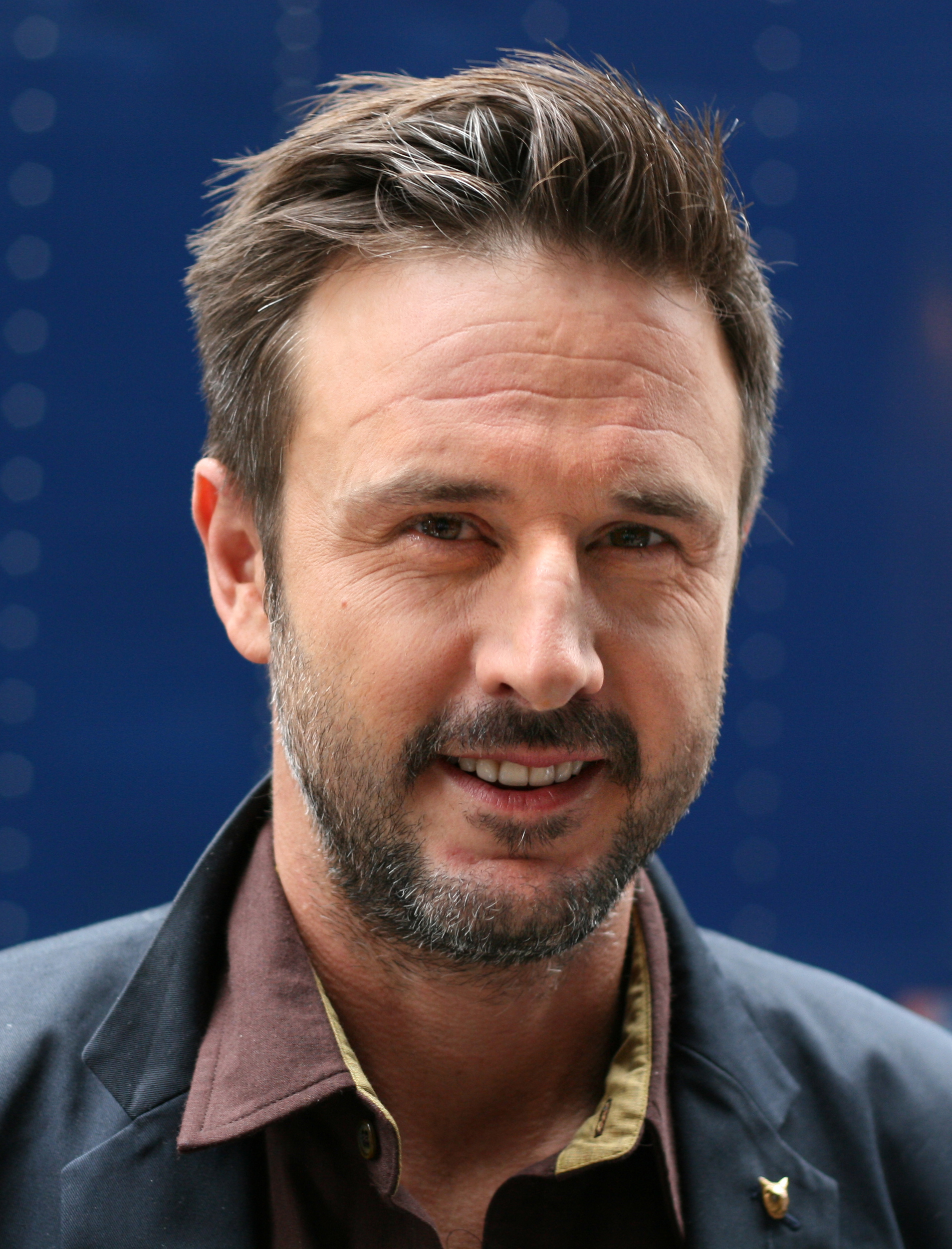
David Arquette

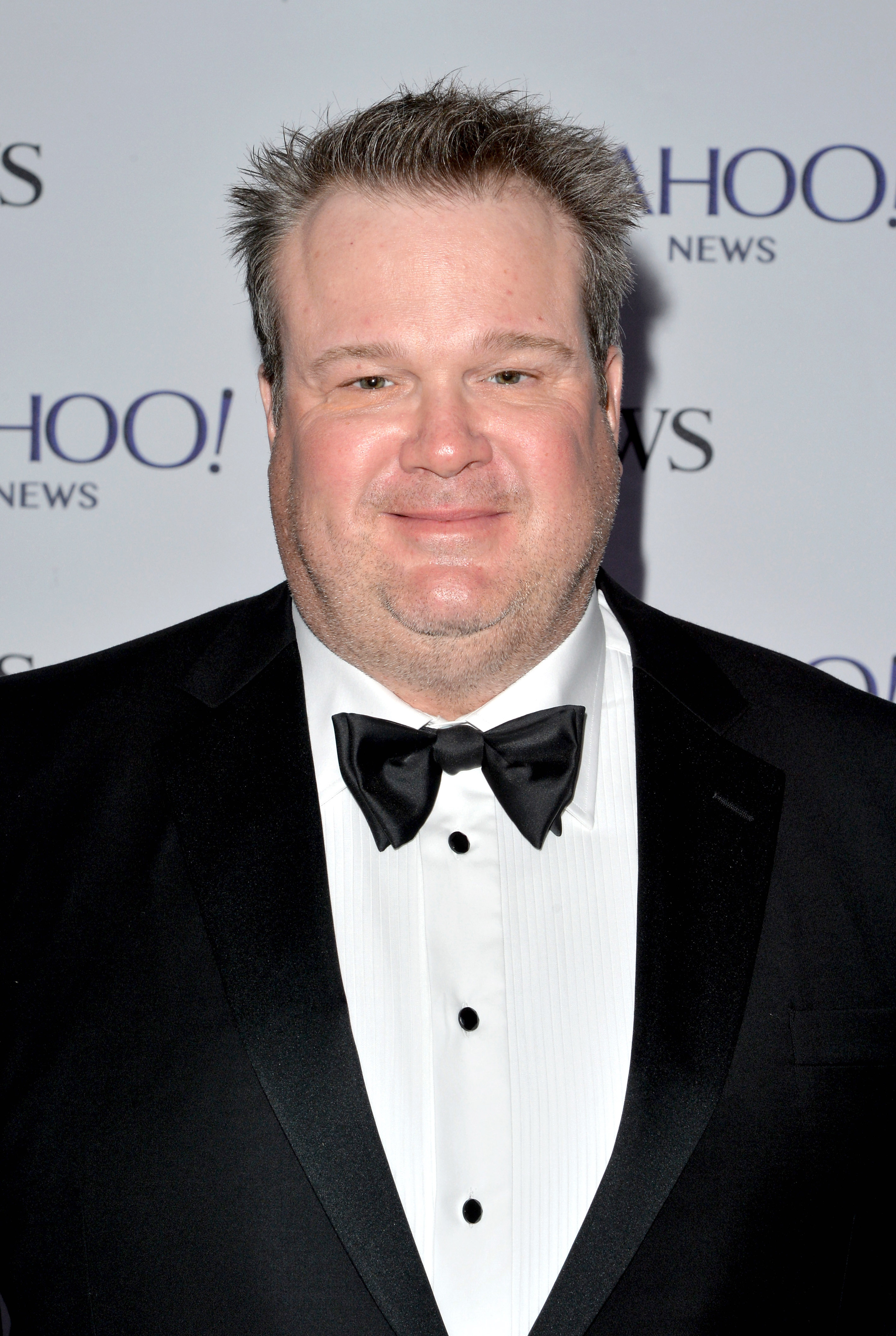
Eric Stonestreet

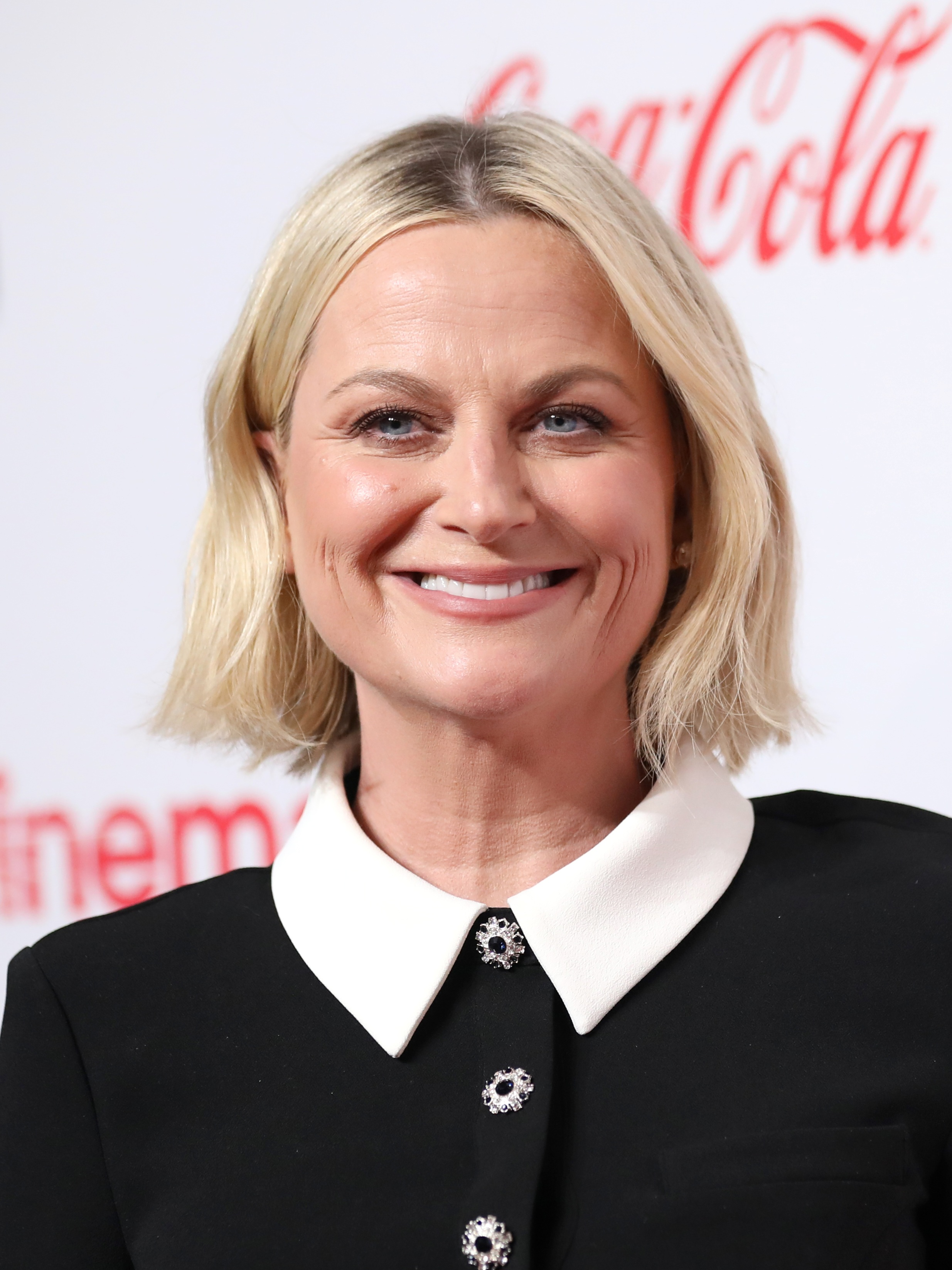
Amy Poehler

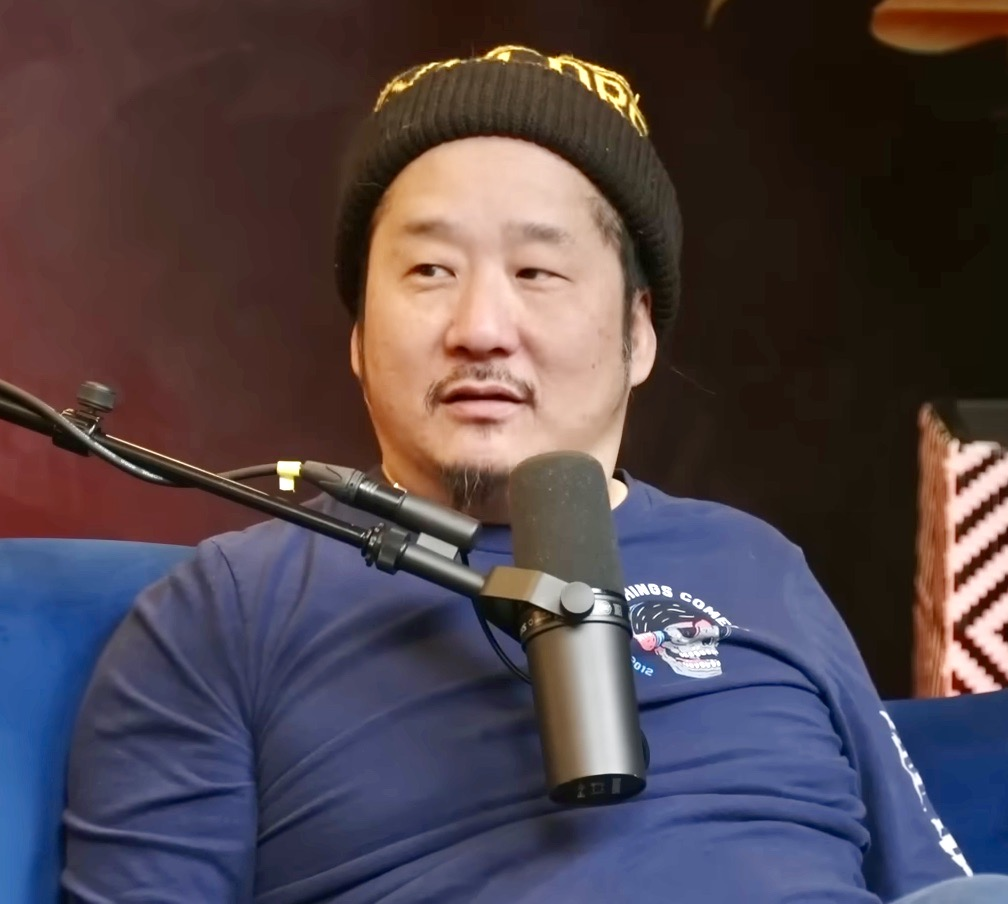
Bobby Lee

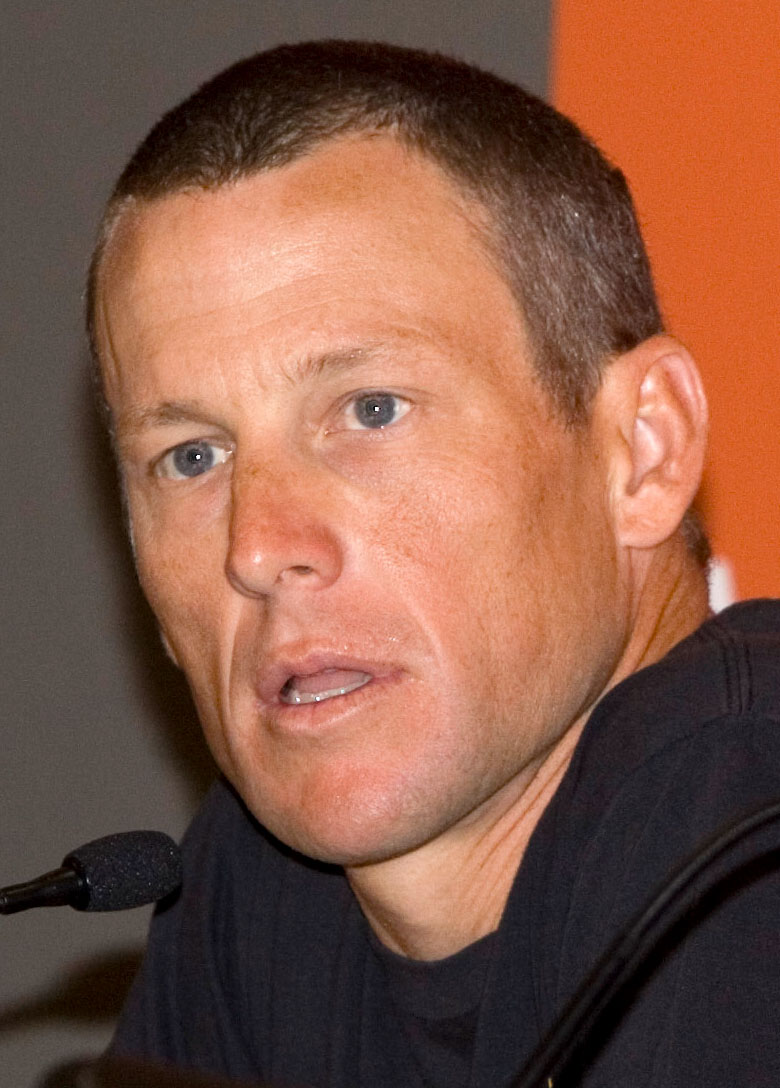
Lance Armstrong

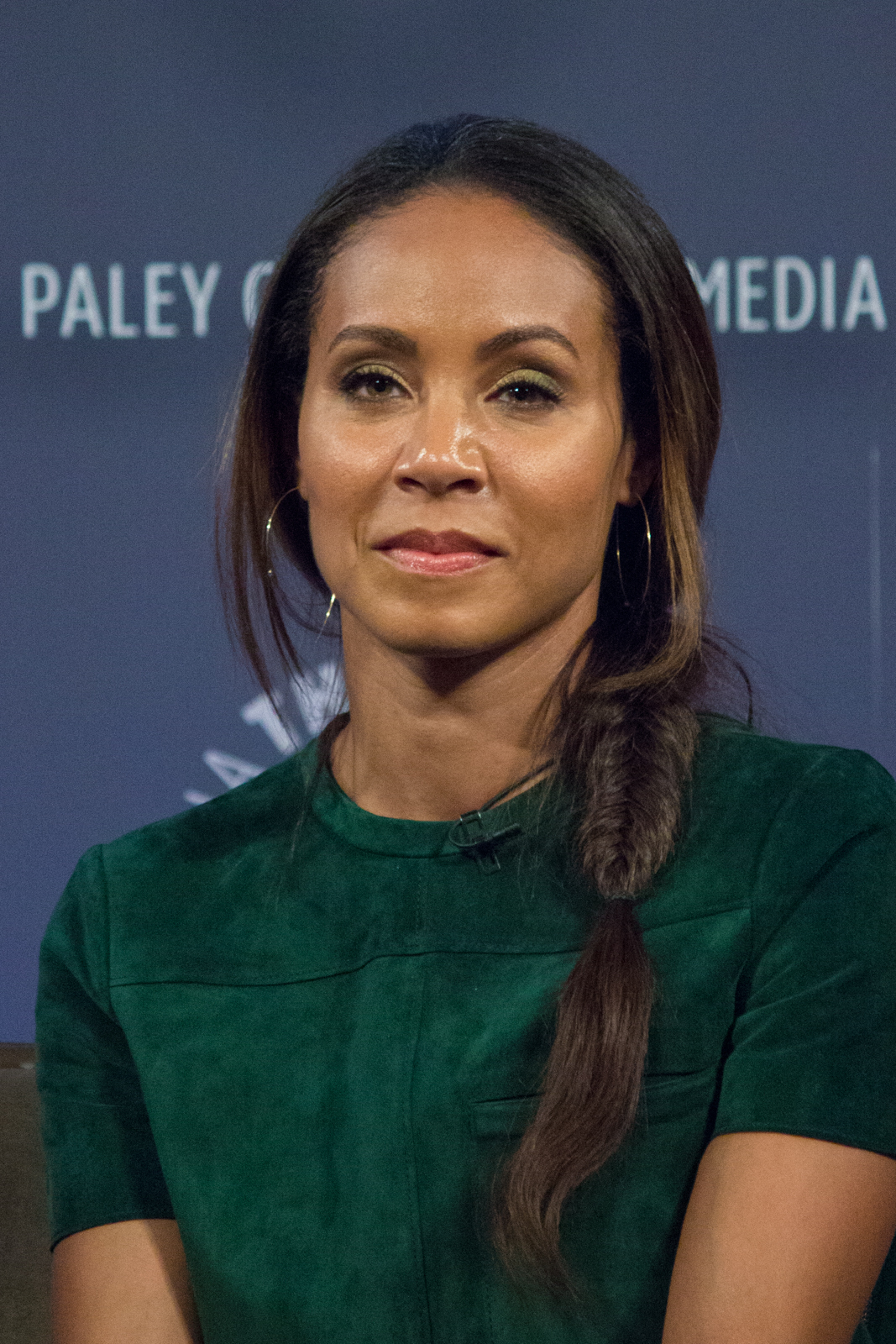
Jada Pinkett Smith

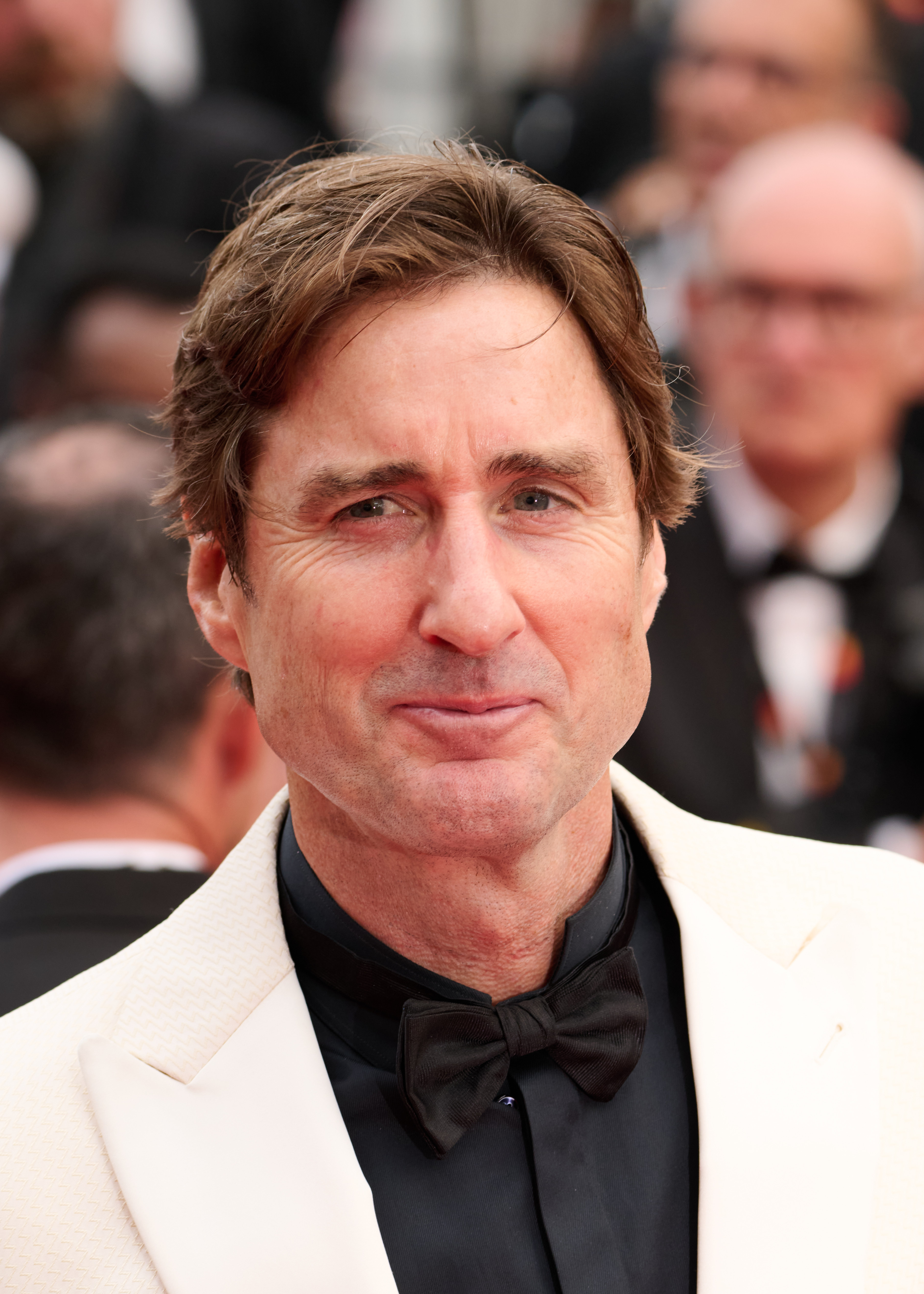
Luke Wilson

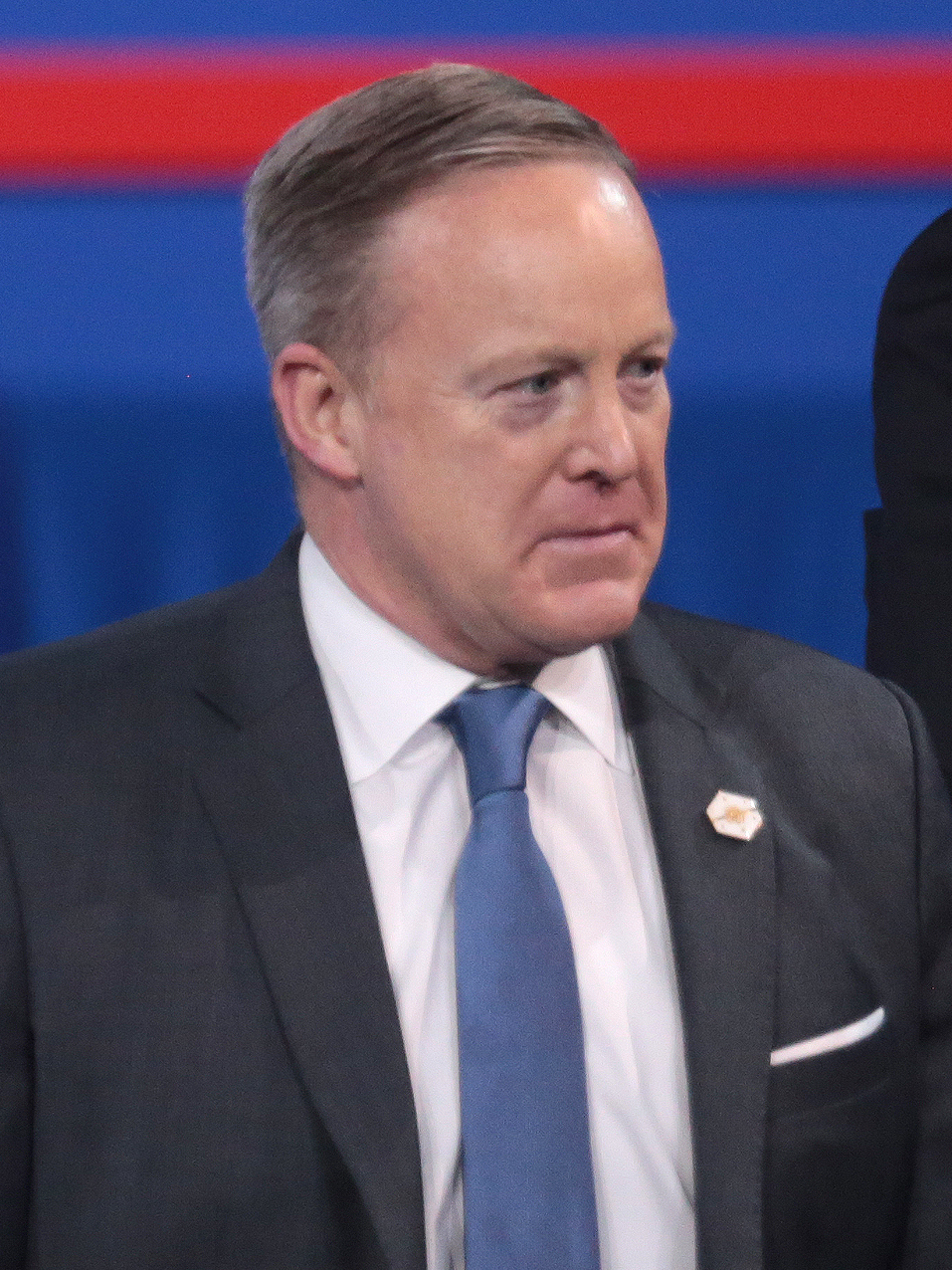
Sean Spicer

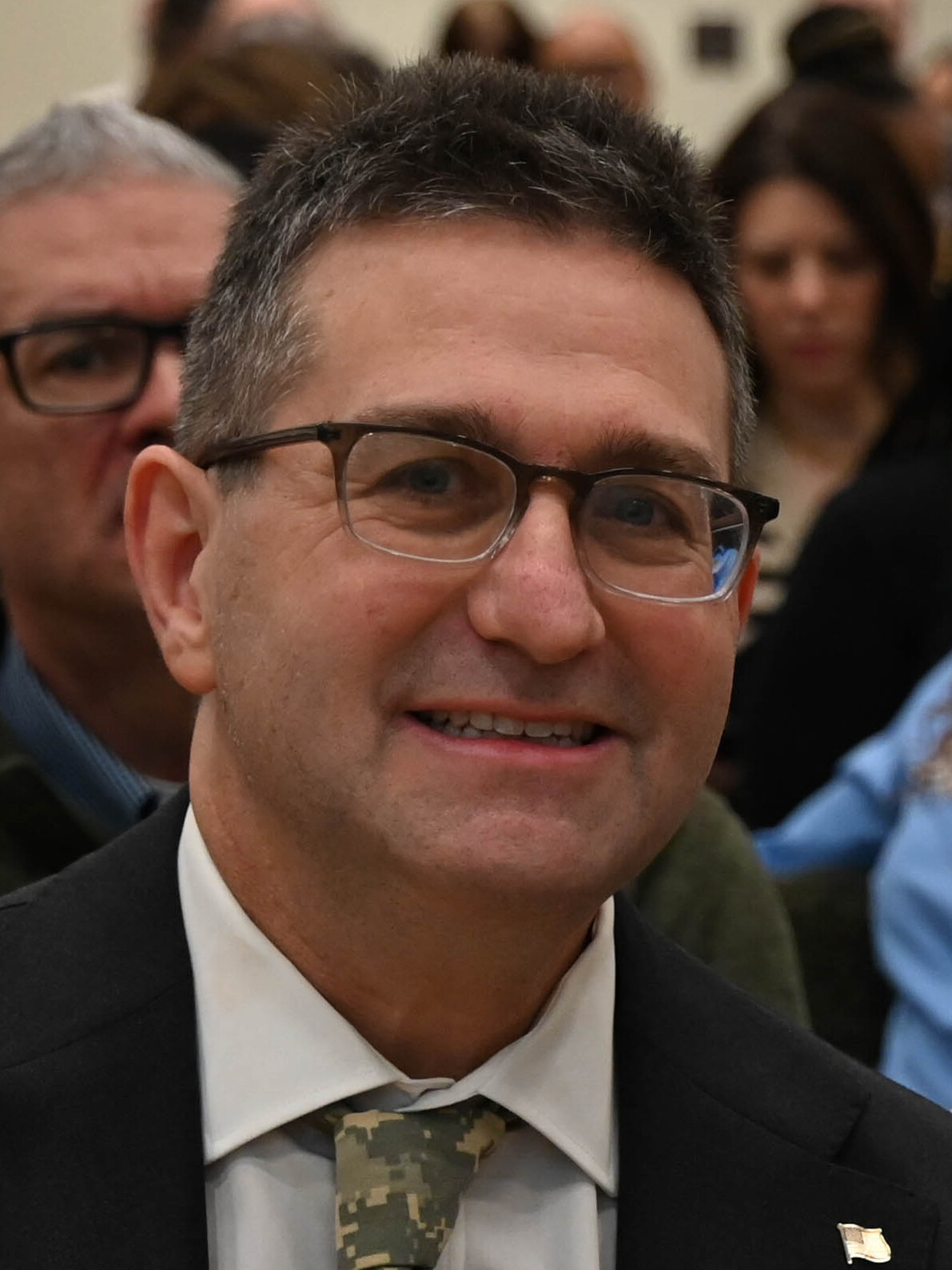
Matt Meyer

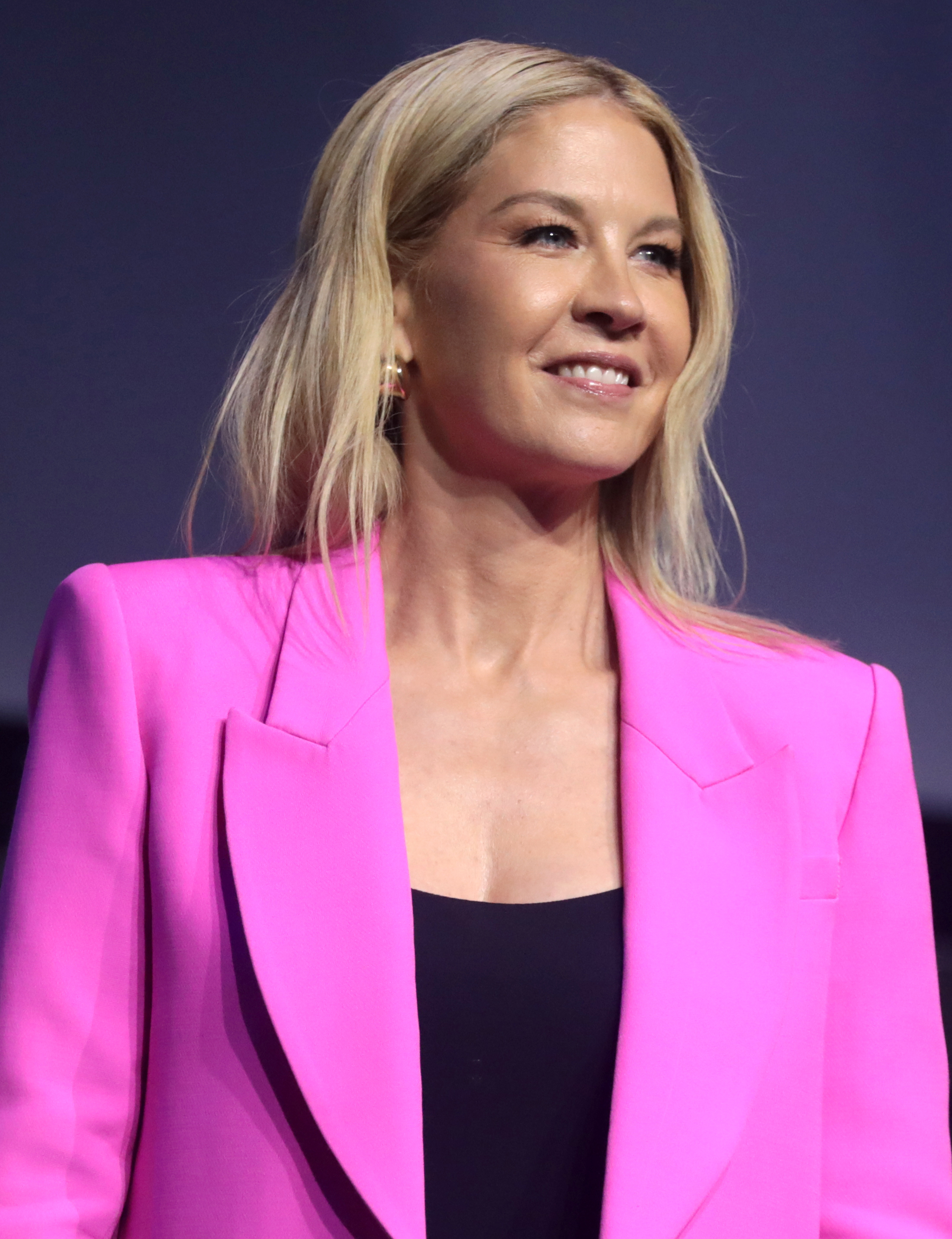
Jenna Elfman

- September 1 – Dave Wittenberg, South African-born voice actor
- September 2
  - Rich Aurilia, baseball player
  - Matt Borland, NASCAR crew chief
  - Tommy Maddox, football player
  - Shauna Sand, model and actress
  - Katt Williams, comedian and actor
- September 4 – Matt Nix, writer, producer, and director
- September 5
  - Will Hunt, drummer for Evanescence
  - Kevin McAleenan, government official, United States Secretary of Homeland Security (2019)
- September 6
  - Kathy Barnette, political commentator and candidate
  - Joey Beltram, DJ and music producer
- September 7
  - John Burke, football player
  - Shane Mosley, boxer
  - Briana Scurry, soccer player
- September 8
  - David Arquette, actor, wrestler, director, producer, screenwriter, and fashion designer
  - Brooke Burke, model
- September 9
  - Eric Stonestreet, actor
  - Henry Thomas, actor and musician
- September 10
  - Samba Baldeh, Gambian-born politician
  - Joe Bravo, jockey
- September 11
  - Luis Barragan, businessman (d. 2006)
  - Markos Moulitsas, soldier, activist, blogger, and author
  - Shelton Quarles, football player and scout
- September 12
  - Sidney Albritton, politician
  - Galit Atlas, Israeli-born psychoanalyst
- September 13
  - Dean Blandino, rules analyst for Fox Sports
  - Brent Brede, baseball player
  - Diane and Elaine Klimaszewski, twin sisters and models
- September 14
  - Christopher McCulloch, actor and voice actor
  - Kimberly Williams-Paisley, actress
- September 15
  - Donatella Arpaia, restaurateur and television personality
  - Myron Bell, football player
  - Terrance Bowen, sprinter
  - Chad Bratzke, football player
  - Josh Charles, actor
  - Colleen Villard, voice actress
- September 16 – Amy Poehler, actress
- September 17
  - Kevin Anderson, soccer player
  - Nate Berkus, interior designer, author, and television personality
  - Bobby Lee, comedian, actor, and podcaster
- September 18
  - Lance Armstrong, cyclist
  - Jada Pinkett Smith, actress
- September 19
  - Rachel Bringer, politician
  - Sanaa Lathan, actress
- September 20 – Mark Boomershine, painter
- September 21
  - Alfonso Ribeiro, actor, television director, dancer, and host of America's Funniest Home Videos
  - Luke Wilson, actor
- September 22
  - Elizabeth Bear, author
  - Ted Leonard, singer and frontman for Enchant
  - Lawrence Gilliard Jr., actor
- September 23
  - David Byerman, business executive
  - Eric Montross, basketball player (d. 2023)
  - Sean Spicer, 30th White House Press Secretary
- September 24
  - Jamie Burke, baseball player
  - Michael S. Engel, paleontologist & entomologist
  - Kevin Millar, baseball player
- September 25
  - Jeff Bollow, actor, writer, director, producer, author, public speaker, and film festival organizer
  - Brian Dunkleman, comedian and actor
  - John Lynch, football player
- September 26
  - Ryan J. Bell, Seventh-day Adventist speaker
  - Joel Breton, video game producer
- September 27 – Aaron Belz, writer and poet
- September 28
  - Joseph Arthur, singer/songwriter
  - Jared Ball, University professor
  - Jamie Brewington, baseball player
  - Scott Brinker, computer programmer and entrepreneur
- September 29
  - Tanoka Beard, basketball player and coach
  - Joanna Brooks, author and professor
  - Ray Buchanan, football player
  - Matt Meyer, politician, 75th Governor of Delaware
- September 30
  - Brentson Buckner, football player and coach
  - Jenna Elfman, actress
  - Jeff Whitty, writer

=== October ===
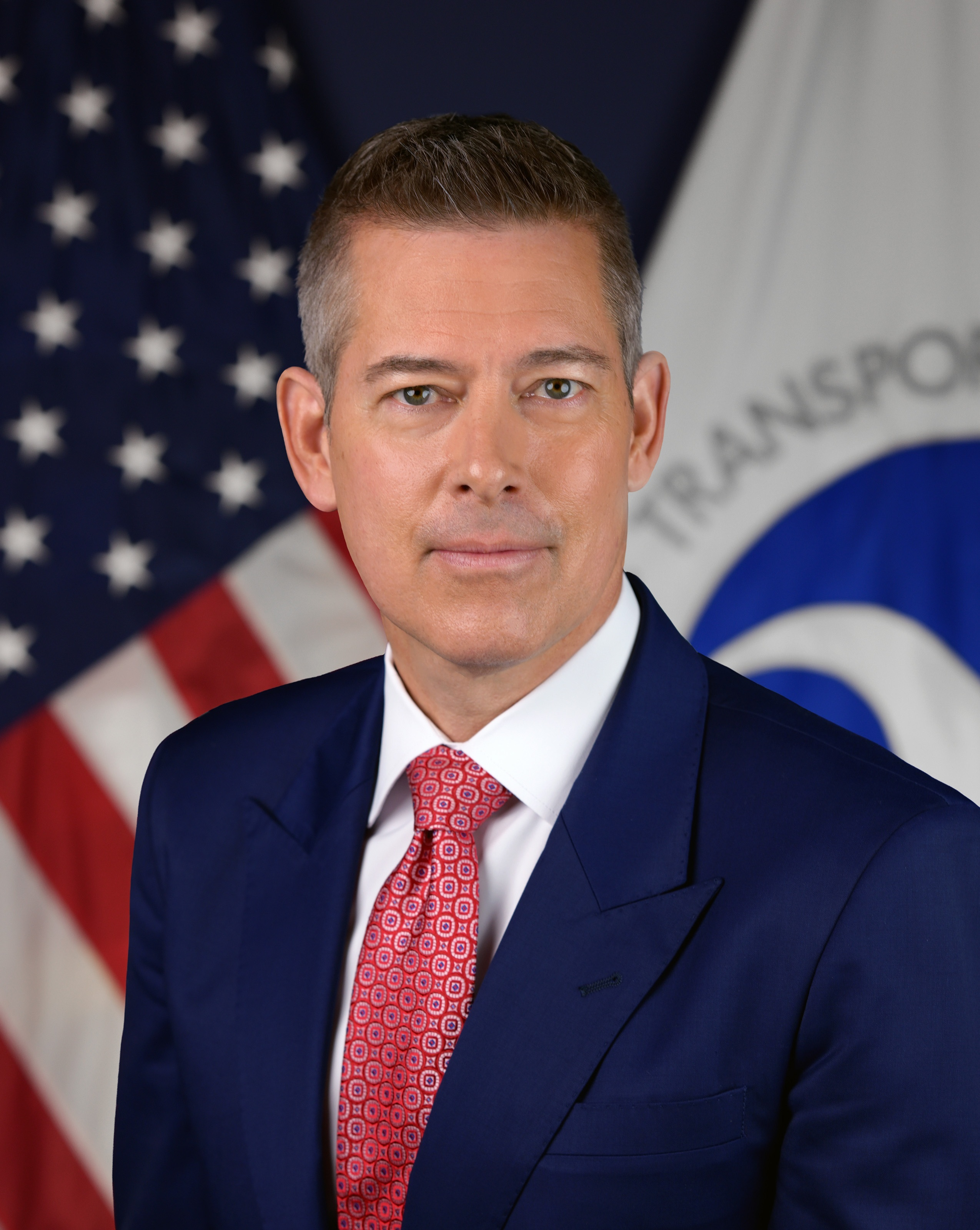
Sean Duffy

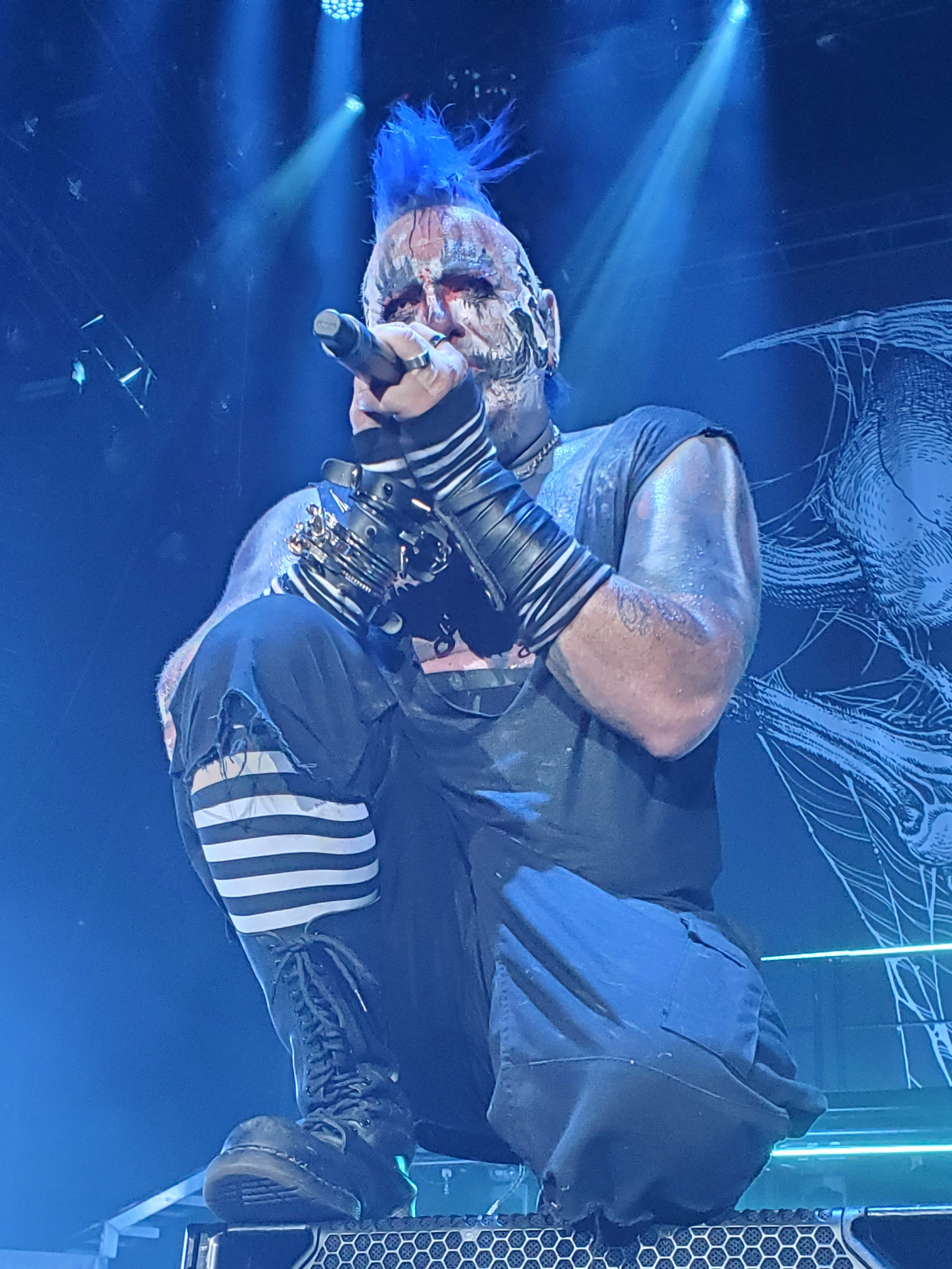
Chad Grey

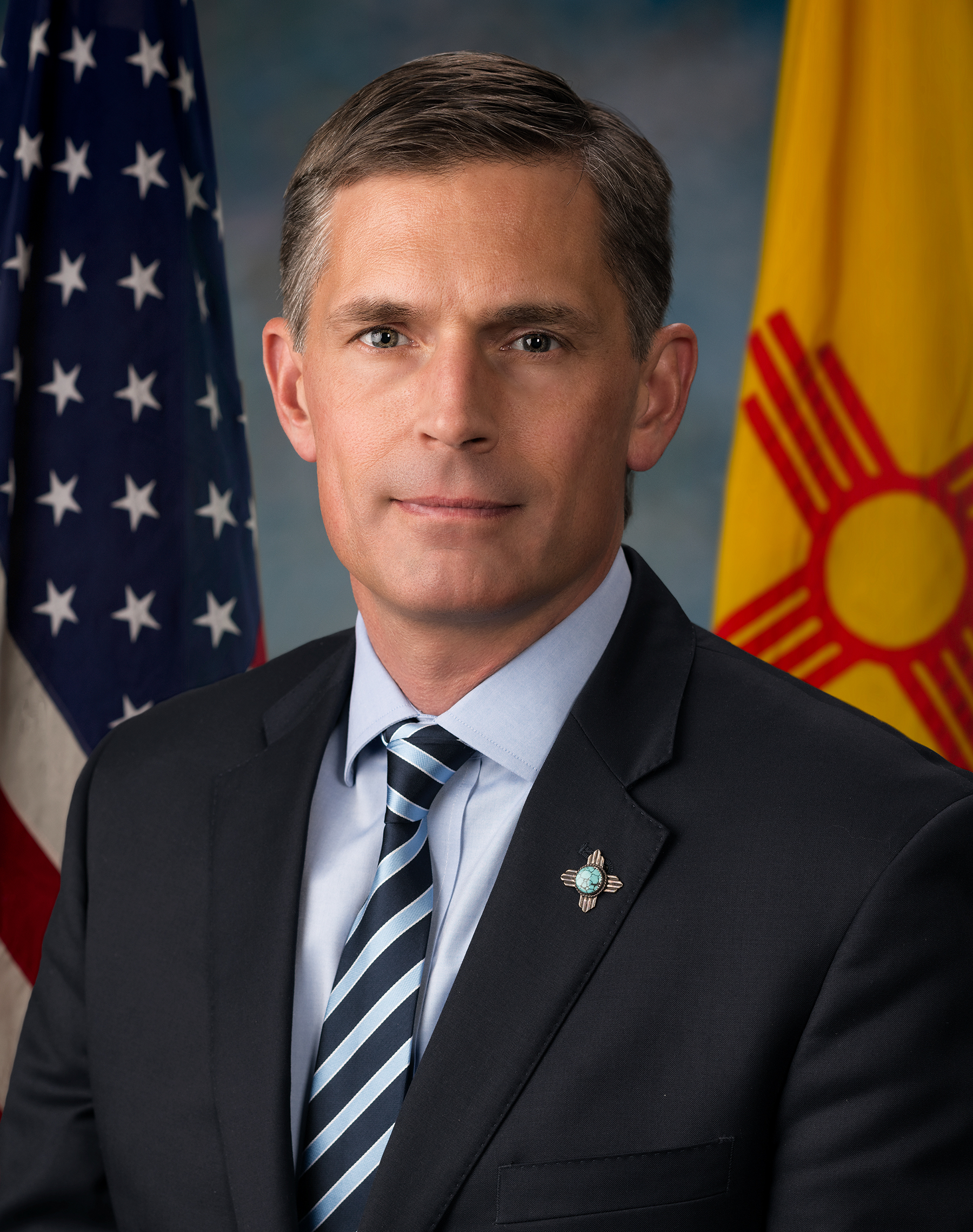
Martin Heinrich

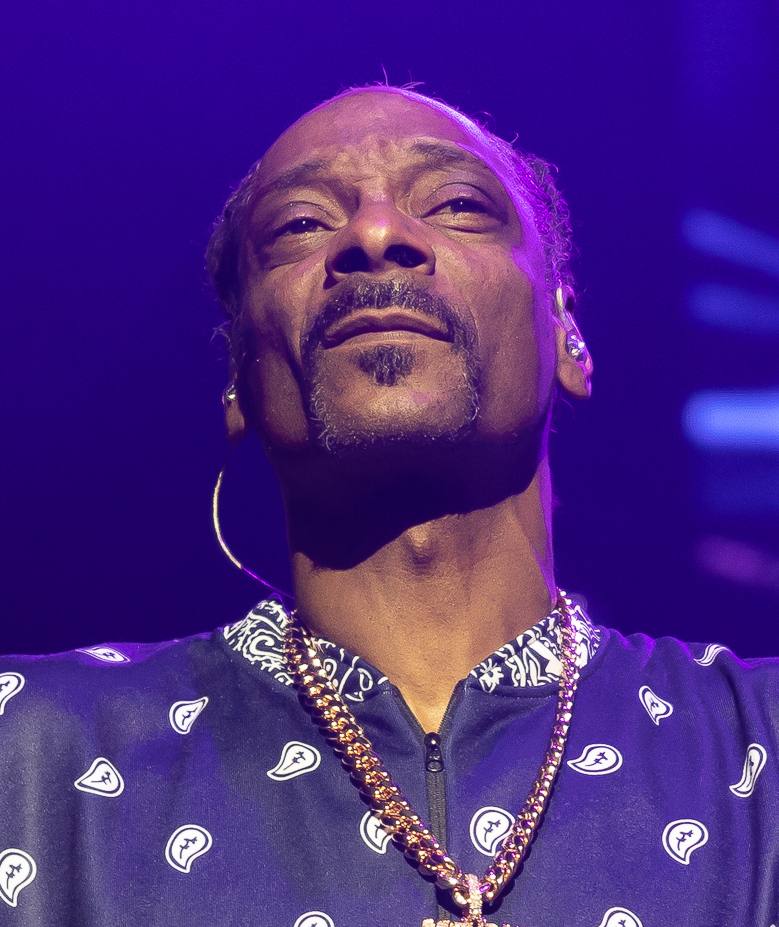
Snoop Dogg

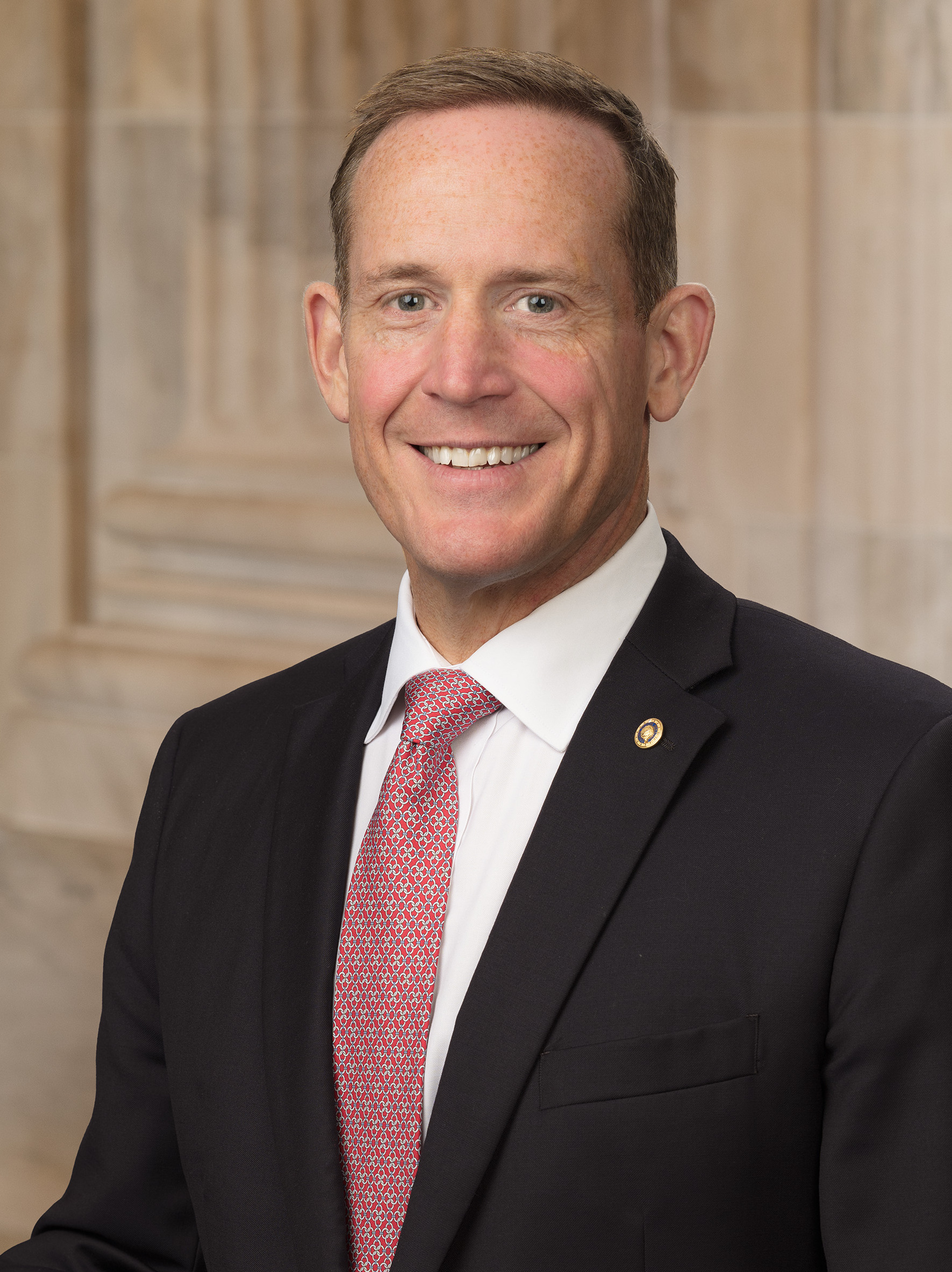
Ted Budd

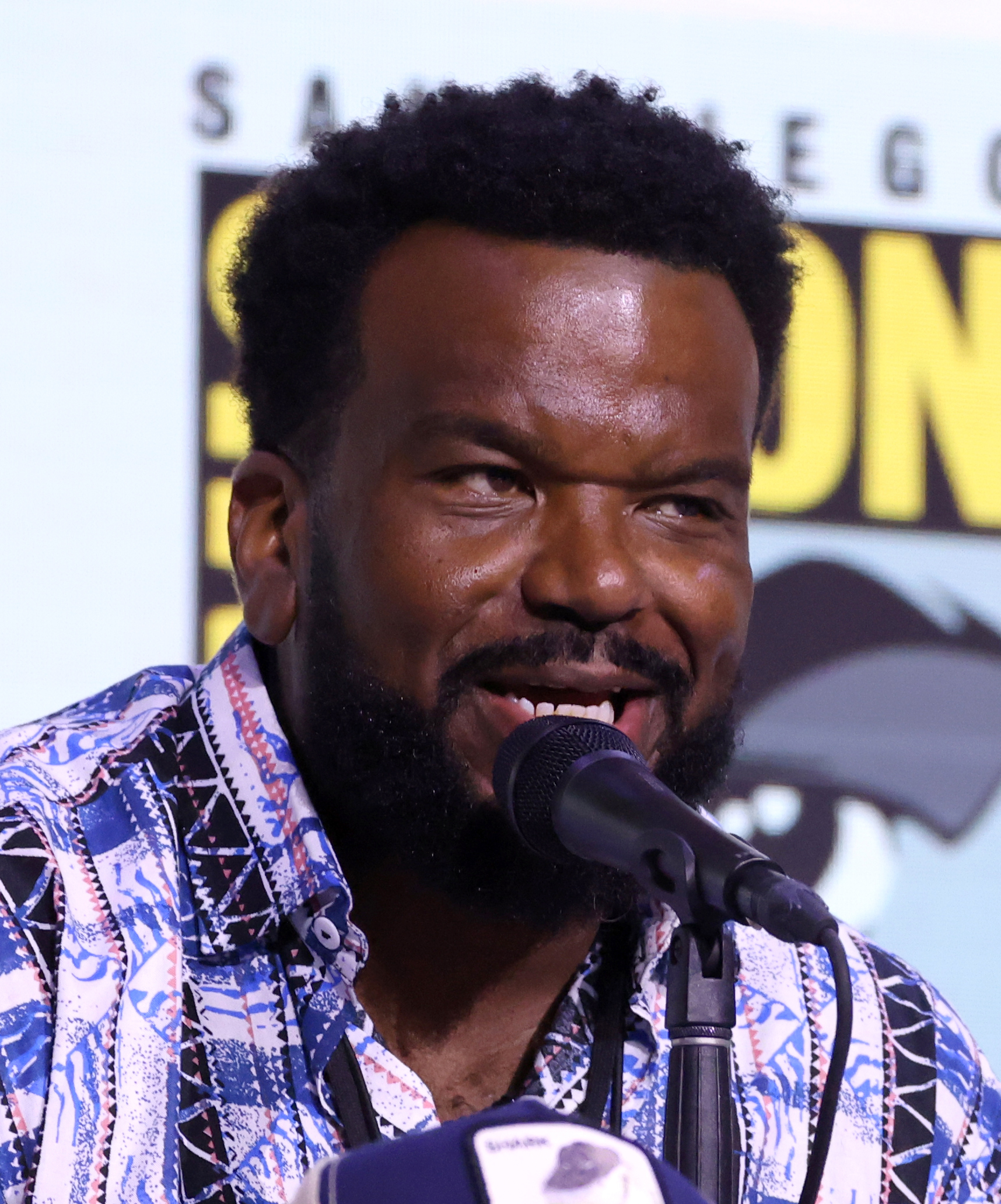
Craig Robinson

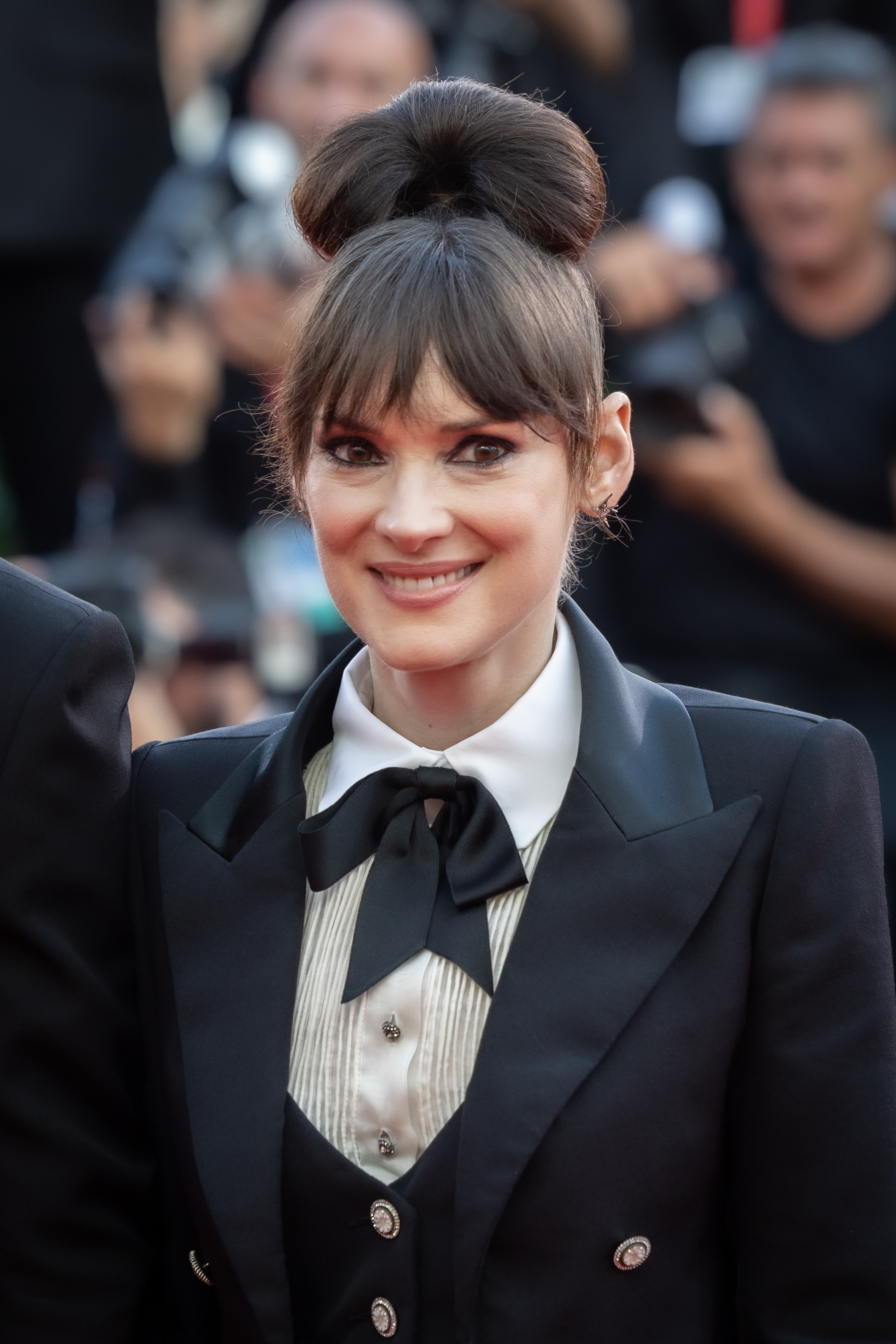
Winona Ryder

- October 2
  - Tiffany Darwish, singer
  - Jim Root, guitarist for Slipknot and Stone Sour
  - Chris Savino, cartoonist, animator, director, storyboard artist, writer, comic book artist and producer
- October 3
  - David Brom, mass murderer
  - Sean Duffy, politician and television personality
  - Chris McCarvill, musician
  - Kevin Richardson, singer and member of the Backstreet Boys
- October 4
  - Jeremy Blake, artist and painter (d. 2007)
  - BT, musician, DJ, singer/songwriter, record producer, composer, and audio engineer
  - Case, singer/songwriter, record producer, and actor
- October 5
  - Ray Barbee, skateboarder, photographer, and musician
  - Shane Battelle, soccer player
  - Kevin Boyce, politician
- October 6 – Jason Altom, PhD student (d. 1998)
- October 7
  - Gannin Arnold, Christian songwriter, composer, and producer
  - Kevin M. Birmingham, Roman Catholic bishop
  - Trent Benson, South Korean-born serial killer
- October 8
  - Will Brown, basketball coach
  - Sean Palmer, actor
- October 9 – Stevie Richards, wrestler
- October 10 – Tiffany Mynx, porn actress and director
- October 11 – Wes Abbott, comic book artist
- October 12
  - Rosie Alfaro, convicted murderer
  - Chris Brennan, mixed martial artist
- October 13 – Billy Bush, radio and television host
- October 14 – Frank Wycheck, American football player (d. 2023)
- October 15
  - Joey Abs, wrestler
  - Shawn Andrews, actor
  - Alexus Grynkewich, U.S. Air Force General and NATO Supreme Allied Commander (2025-present)
- October 16
  - Chad Grey, singer and frontman for Mudvayne
  - Paul Sparks, actor
- October 17
  - Martin Heinrich, politician
  - Chris Kirkpatrick, singer and member of 'N Sync
  - Blues Saraceno, rock guitarist, composer and music producer
- October 20 – Snoop Dogg, rapper, singer/songwriter, producer, media personality, entrepreneur, and actor
- October 21
  - Damon Bailey, baseball player
  - Ted Budd, politician
- October 22
  - Rachel Campos-Duffy, politician and television personality
  - Jennifer Lee, screenwriter, director, Chief Creative Officer of Walt Disney Animation Studios
- October 23 – Thad Balkman, judge
- October 24
  - Kirby Logan Archer, convicted murderer (missing since 2007)
  - Caprice Bourret, model and actress
  - Aaron Bailey, football player
  - Zephyr Teachout, academic
- October 25
  - Leslie Grossman, actress
  - Craig Robinson, actor and comedian
- October 26
  - Jim Butcher, author
  - Anthony Rapp, actor and singer
- October 27
  - Derek Benz, writer
  - Fani Willis, lawyer
- October 28 – Scott Budnick, soccer player and coach
- October 29
  - Daniel J. Bernstein, American-born German mathematician, cryptologist, and computer scientist
  - Kevin Bracken, wrestler
  - Winona Ryder, actress

=== November ===
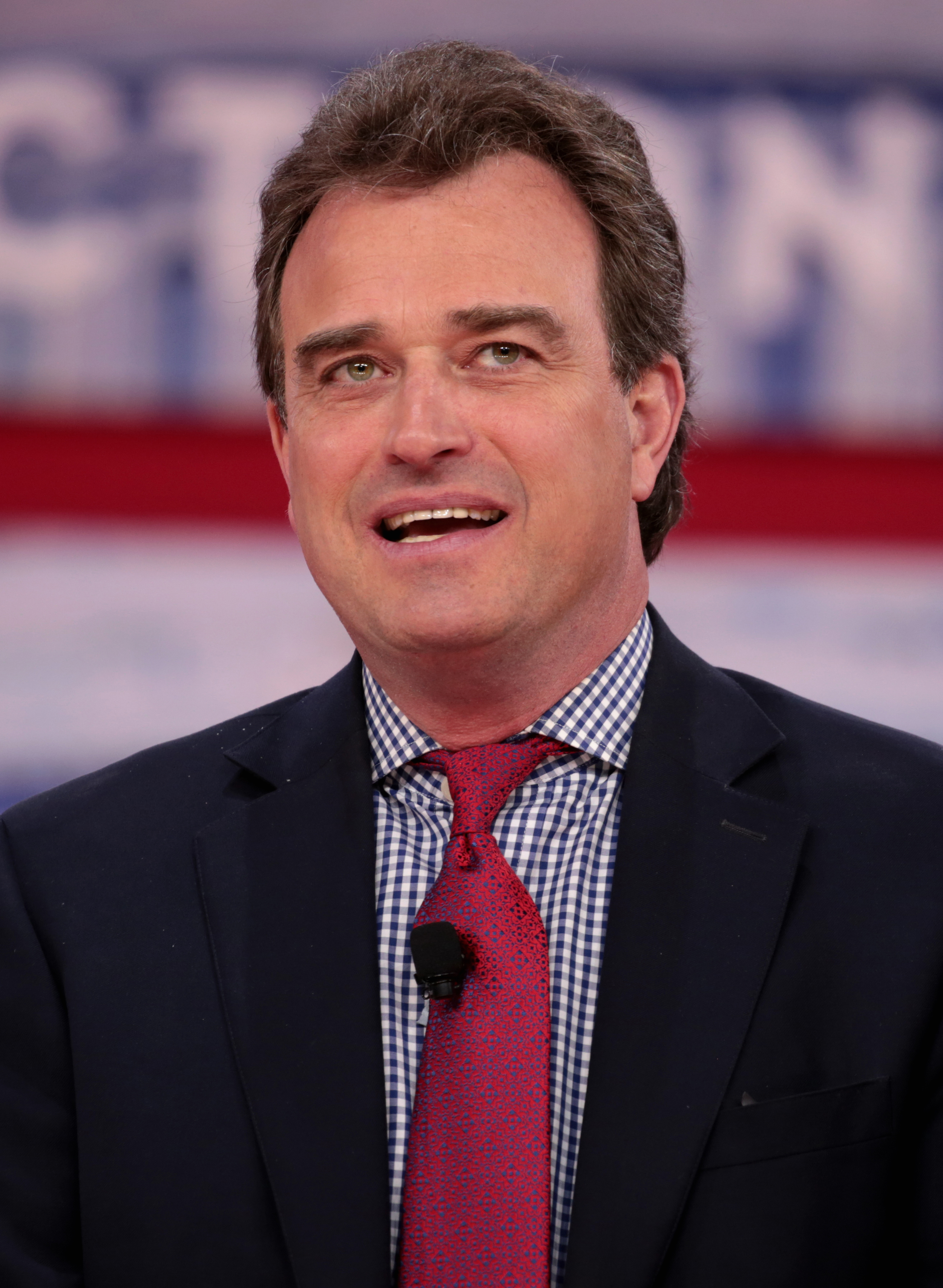
Charles Hurt

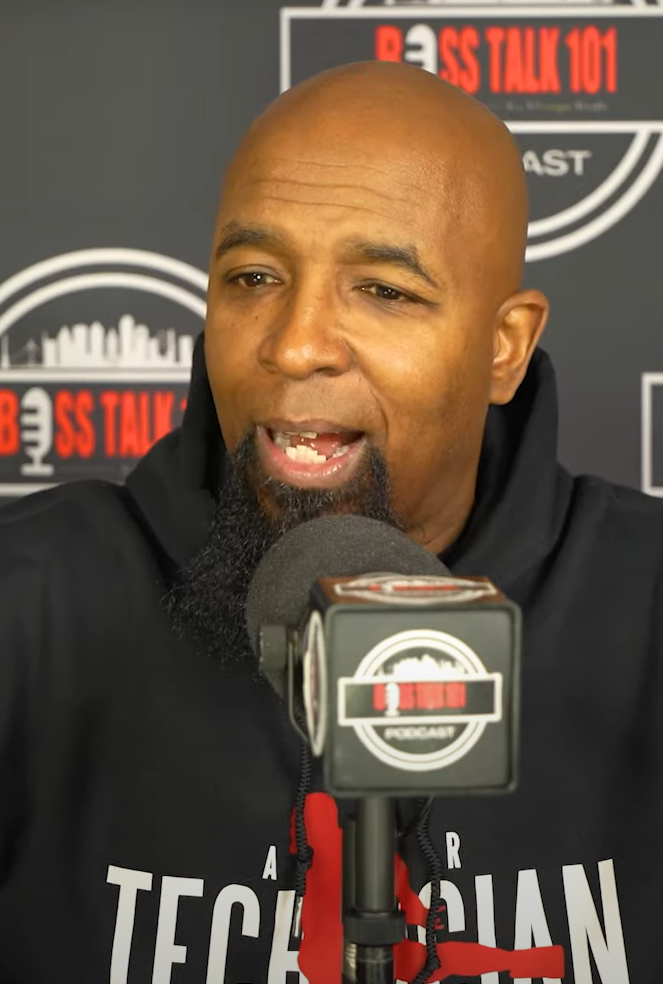
Tech N9ne

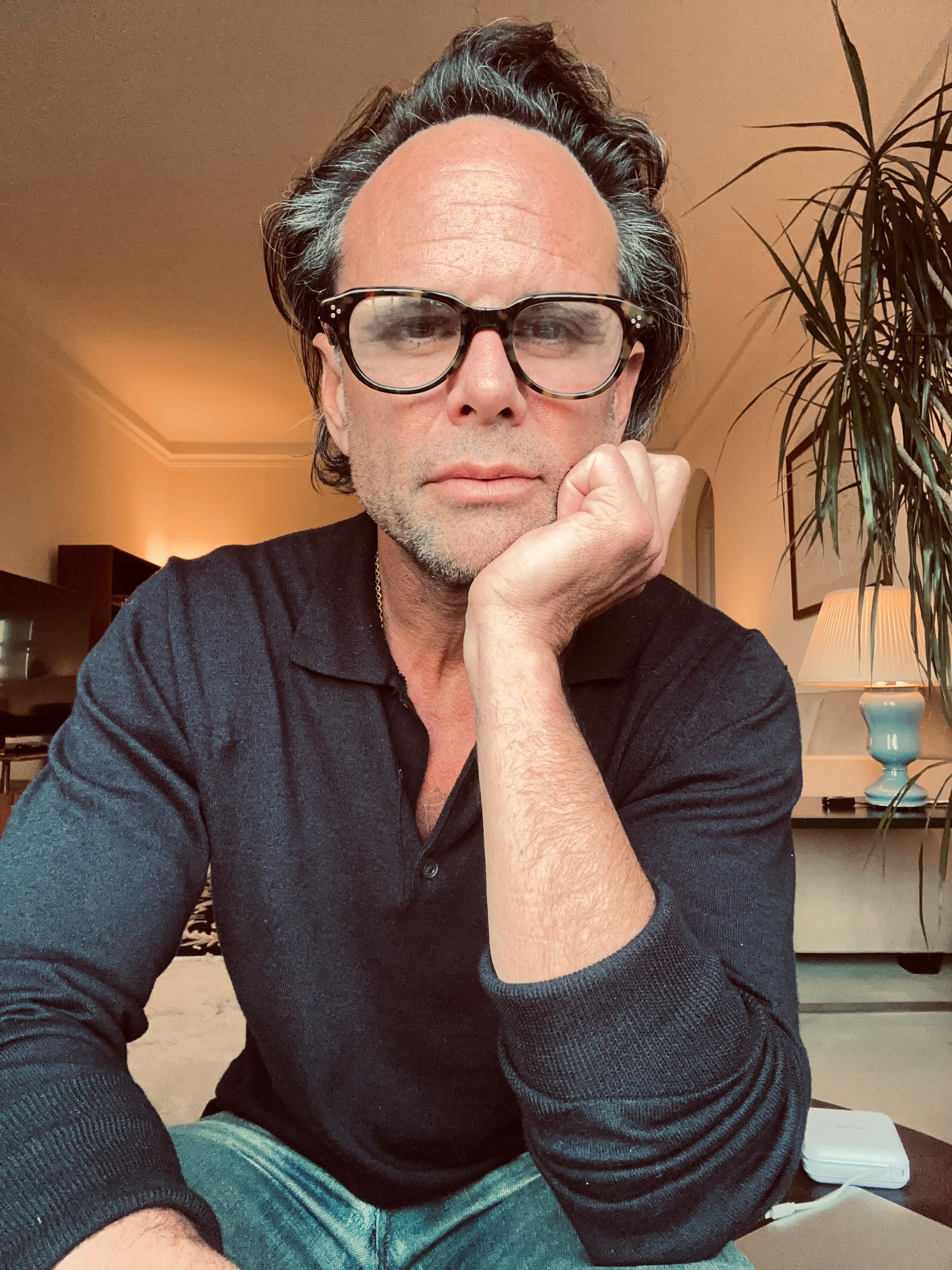
Walton Goggins

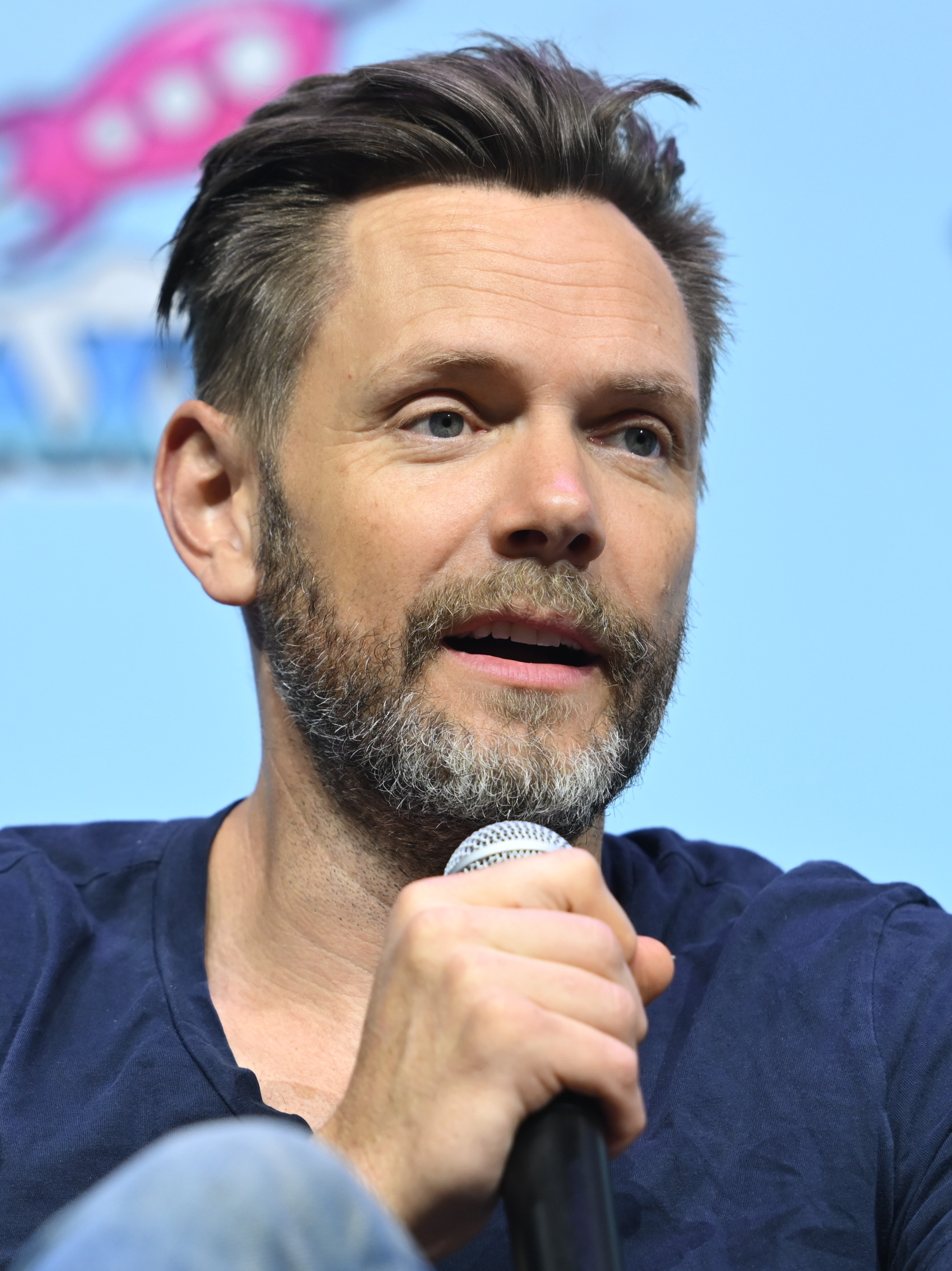
Joel McHale

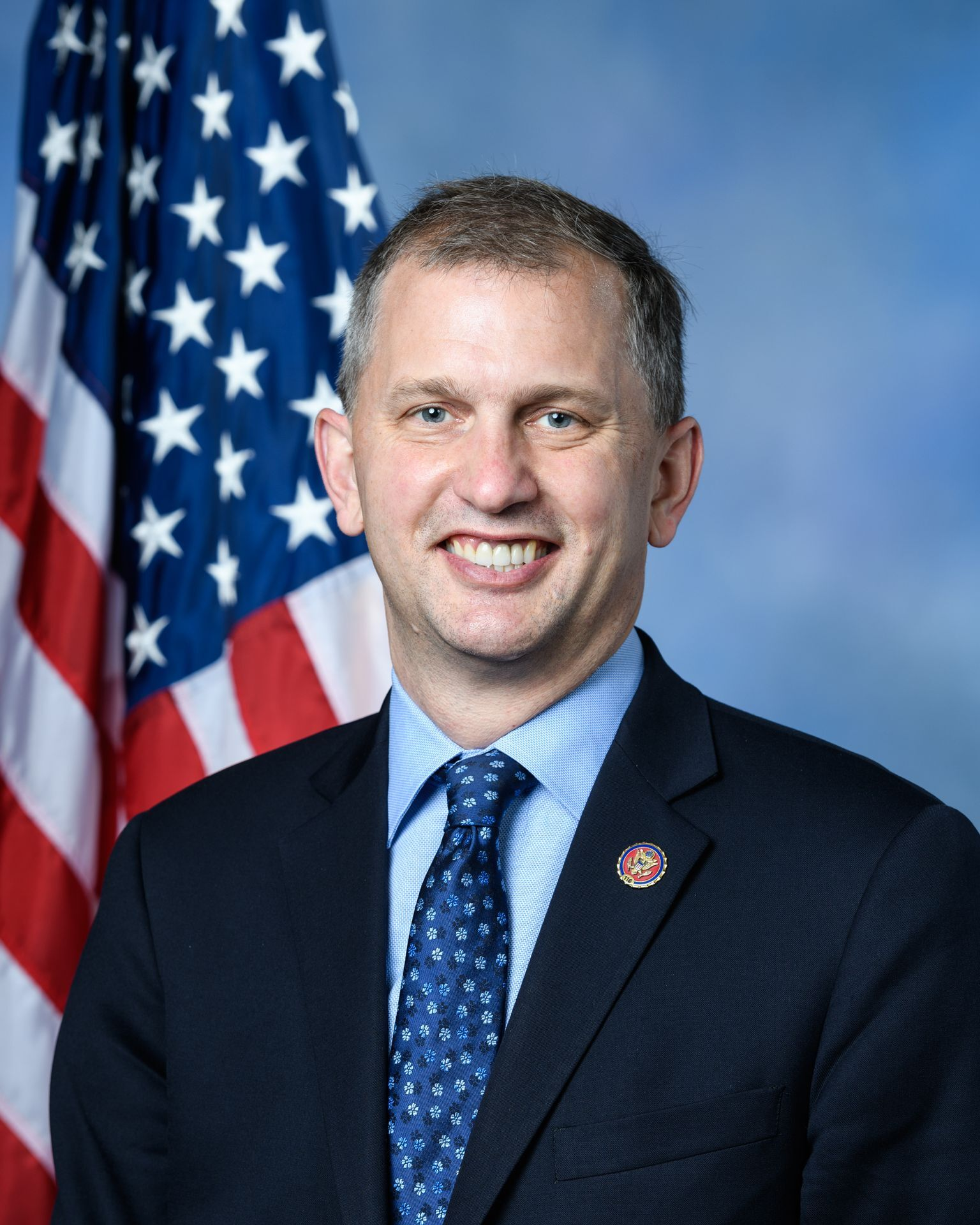
Sean Casten

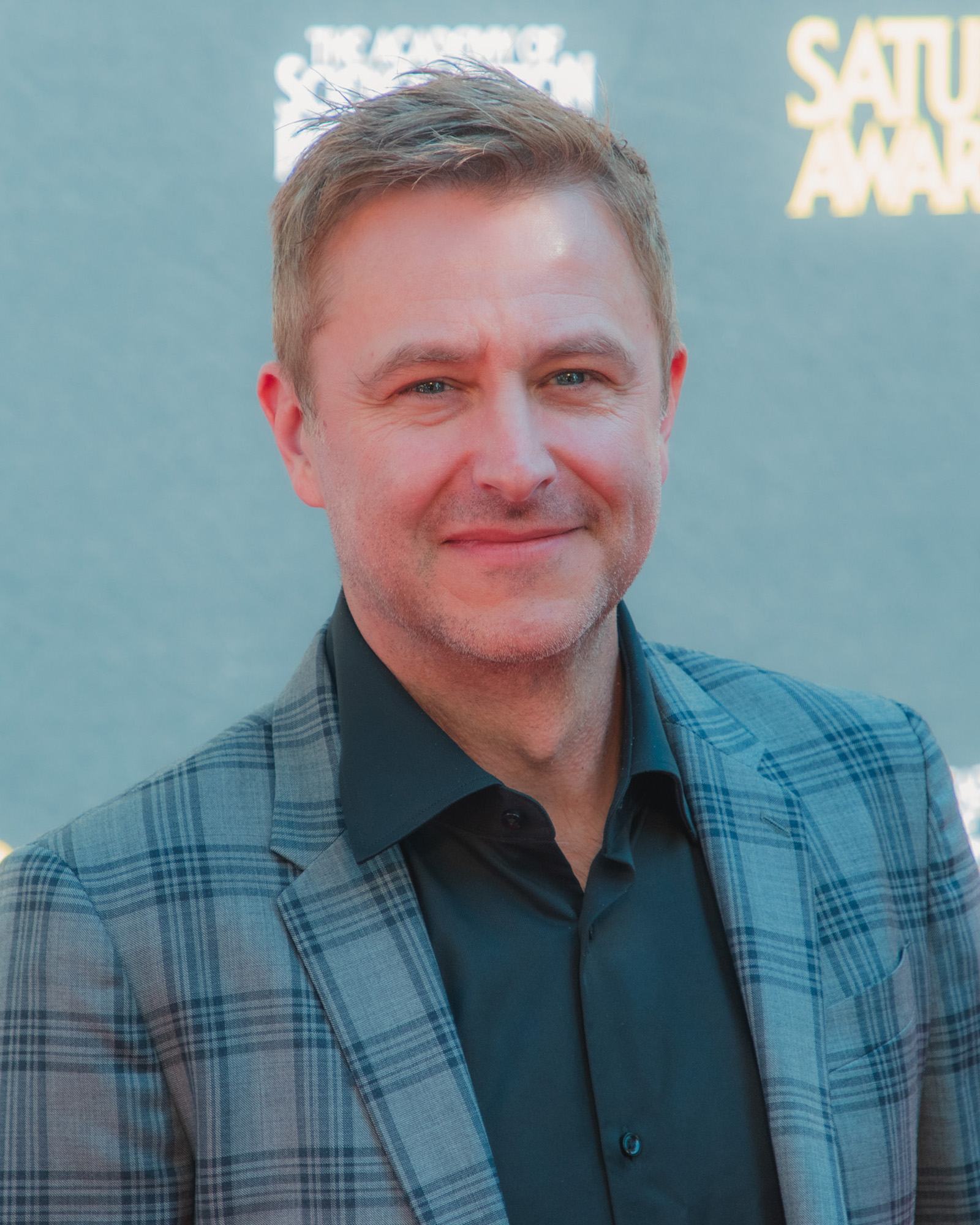
Chris Hardwick

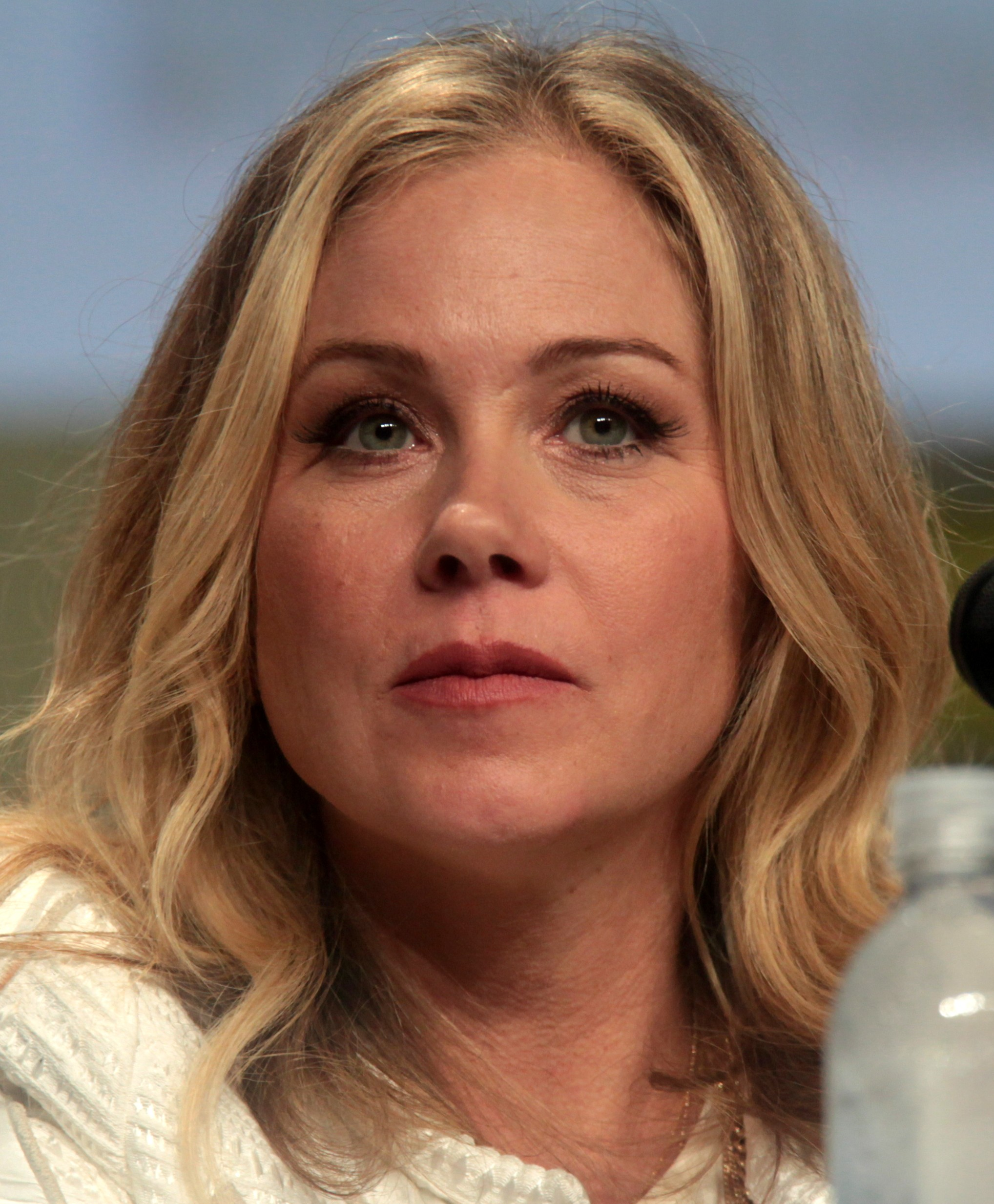
Christina Applegate

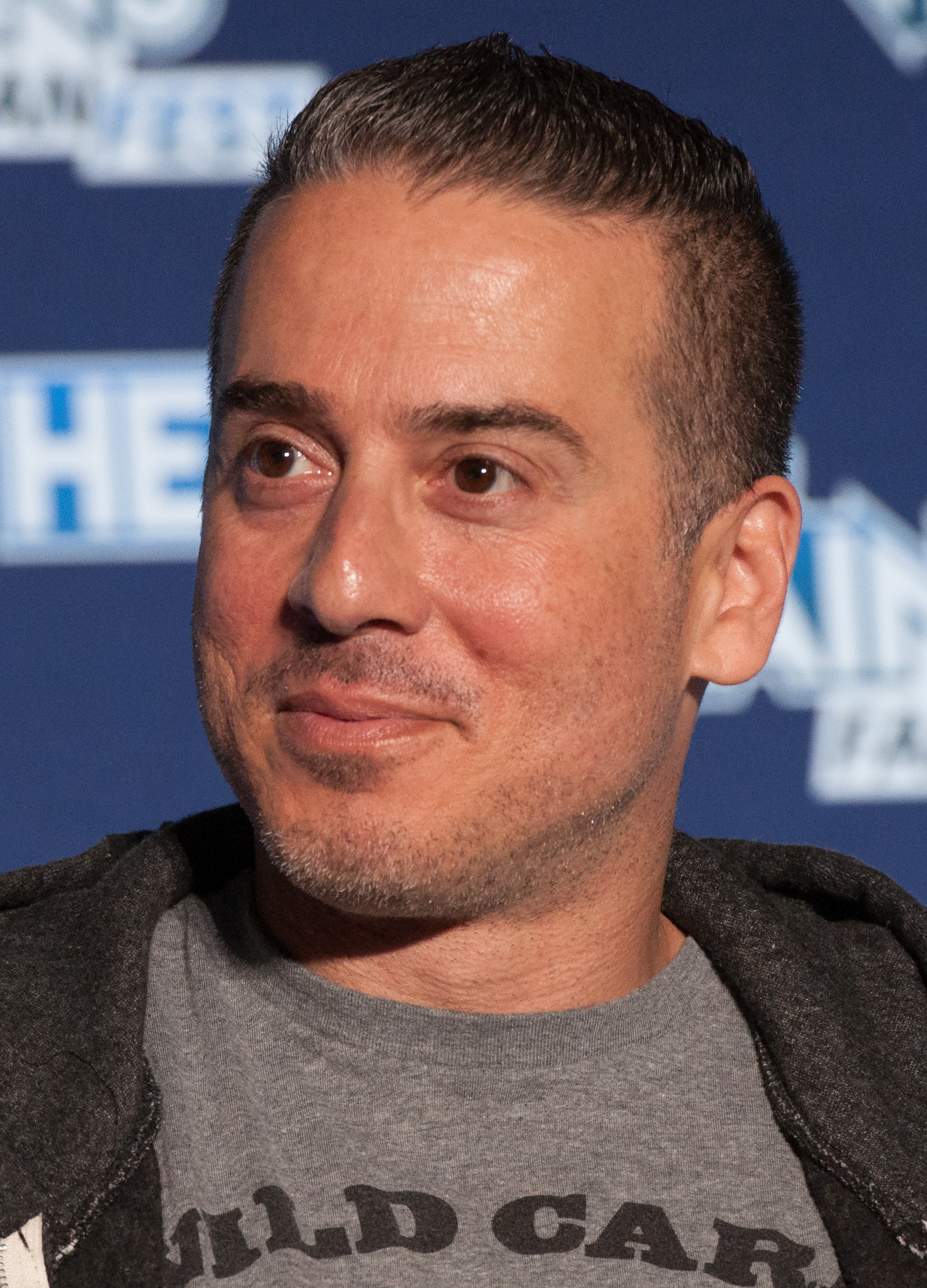
Kirk Acevedo

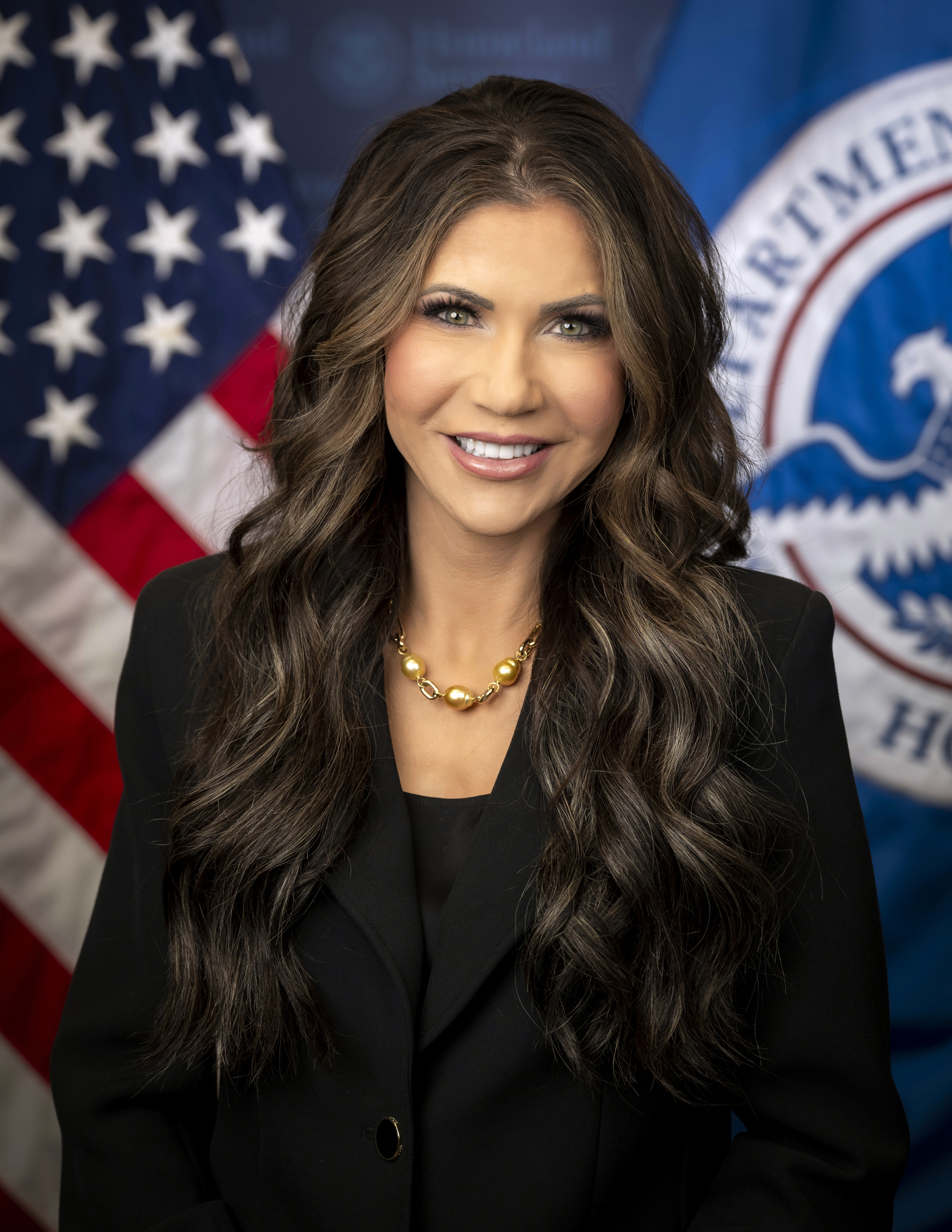
Kristi Noem

- November 2
  - Big Ed, rapper (d. 2001)
  - Eric Wall, writer and political activist
- November 3
  - Danielle Allen, university professor and political candidate
  - Jonathan Blow, video game designer and programmer
  - Jason C. Buckel, politician
  - Charles Hurt, journalist and political commentator
  - Satya Rhodes-Conway, politician, mayor of Madison, Wisconsin (2019– )
- November 4
  - Melvin Bunch, baseball player
  - Richard Hudson, politician
- November 5
  - Johan Bollen, Belgian-born scientist
  - Dana Jacobson, sportscaster
  - Corin Nemec, actor, producer and screenwriter
- November 6 – Derrick Alexander, football player
- November 7
  - Zak Brown, American-born British racing driver and businessman
  - Robin Finck, guitarist
- November 8
  - Jack Baruth, automotive journalist
  - Naomi Biden, daughter of Joe Biden (d. 1972)
  - Benjamin King, actor
  - Tech N9ne, rapper
- November 9
  - Jason Antoon, actor
  - Mike Barber, football player
  - Big Pun, rapper (d. 2000)
  - Jamie Bishop, University professor (d. 2007)
- November 10
  - Big Pun, Puerto Rican-born rapper (d. 2000)
  - Holly Black, journalist, author and poet
  - Walton Goggins, actor
  - Terry Pearson, baseball player
- November 11
  - Heather Burge, basketball player
  - Heidi Burge, basketball player
  - David DeLuise, actor and son of Dom DeLuise and Carol Arthur
- November 12 – Rebecca Wisocky, actress
- November 13 – Noah Hathaway, actor
- November 15
  - Ciaran Berry, Irish-born poet
  - Jay Harrington, actor
- November 16 – Andy Bialk, animator, storyboard artist and character designer
- November 17 – David Ramsey, actor, director and martial artist
- November 18
  - Edmond Akhtar, Iranian-born Association football player
  - Karl Deisseroth, optogeneticist, Nobel Prize laureate
- November 19 – Jeremy McGrath, motocross racer
- November 20
  - Chris Bisaillon, football player
  - Joel McHale, comedian, actor, writer, television producer and television personality
- November 21
  - Randy Buehler, game developer
  - Michael Strahan, football player and television personality
- November 23
  - Ashraf Amaya, basketball player
  - Lisa Arch, actress and comedian
  - Vin Baker, basketball player and coach
  - Sean Casten, politician
  - Chris Hardwick, actor and comedian
- November 24 – Jacki-O, rapper
- November 25
  - Christina Applegate, actress
  - Matthew J. Baek, South Korean-born illustrator, children's book author and graphic designer
  - Ineitha Lynnette Hardaway, conservative commentator (d. 2023)
- November 26 – Jimi Beach, inventor, entrepreneur and product designer
- November 27
  - Kirk Acevedo, actor
  - Larry Allen, football player
  - Kevin Bacon, politician
  - Halsey Beshears, politician
  - Dain Blanton, Olympic beach volleyball player
- November 29
  - Marc Bernardin, journalist, public speaker, TV and comic book writer and podcaster
  - Kenny Blakeney, basketball player and coach
  - Greg Byrne, athletic director
- November 30
  - Nicole Blackman, artist, poet, author and vocalist
  - Kristi Noem, politician, 33rd Governor of South Dakota (2019–2025) and Secretary of Homeland Security (2025– )
  - Tahesha Way, politician, 3rd Lieutenant Governor of New Jersey (2023– )

=== December ===
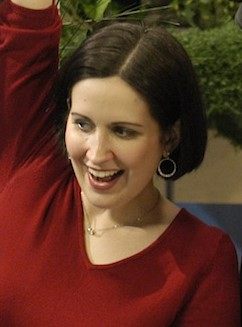
Stephanie D'Abruzzo

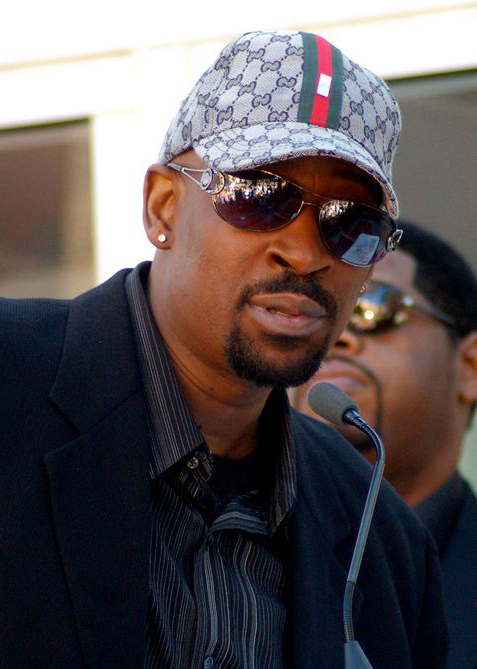
Michael McCary

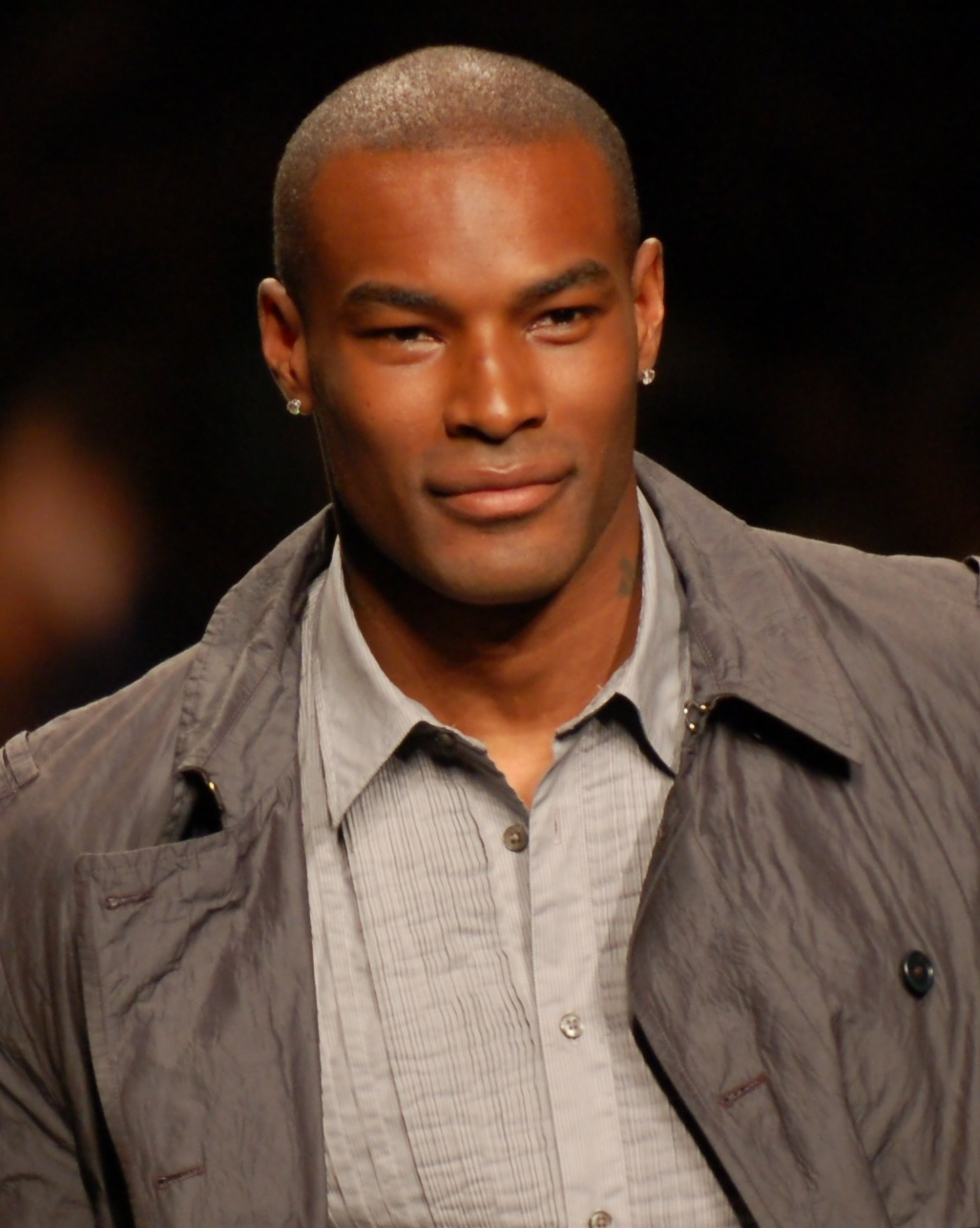
Tyson Beckford

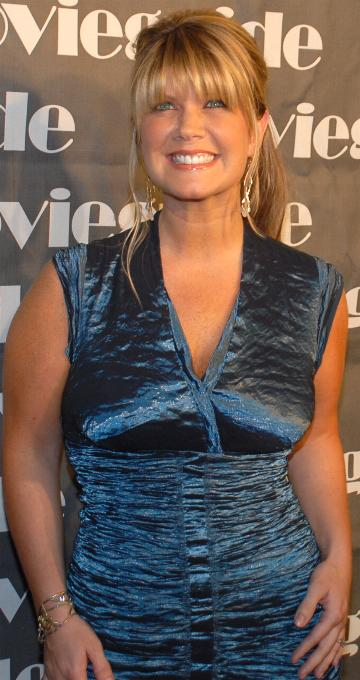
Natalie Grant

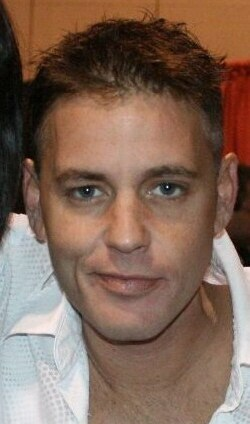
Corey Haim

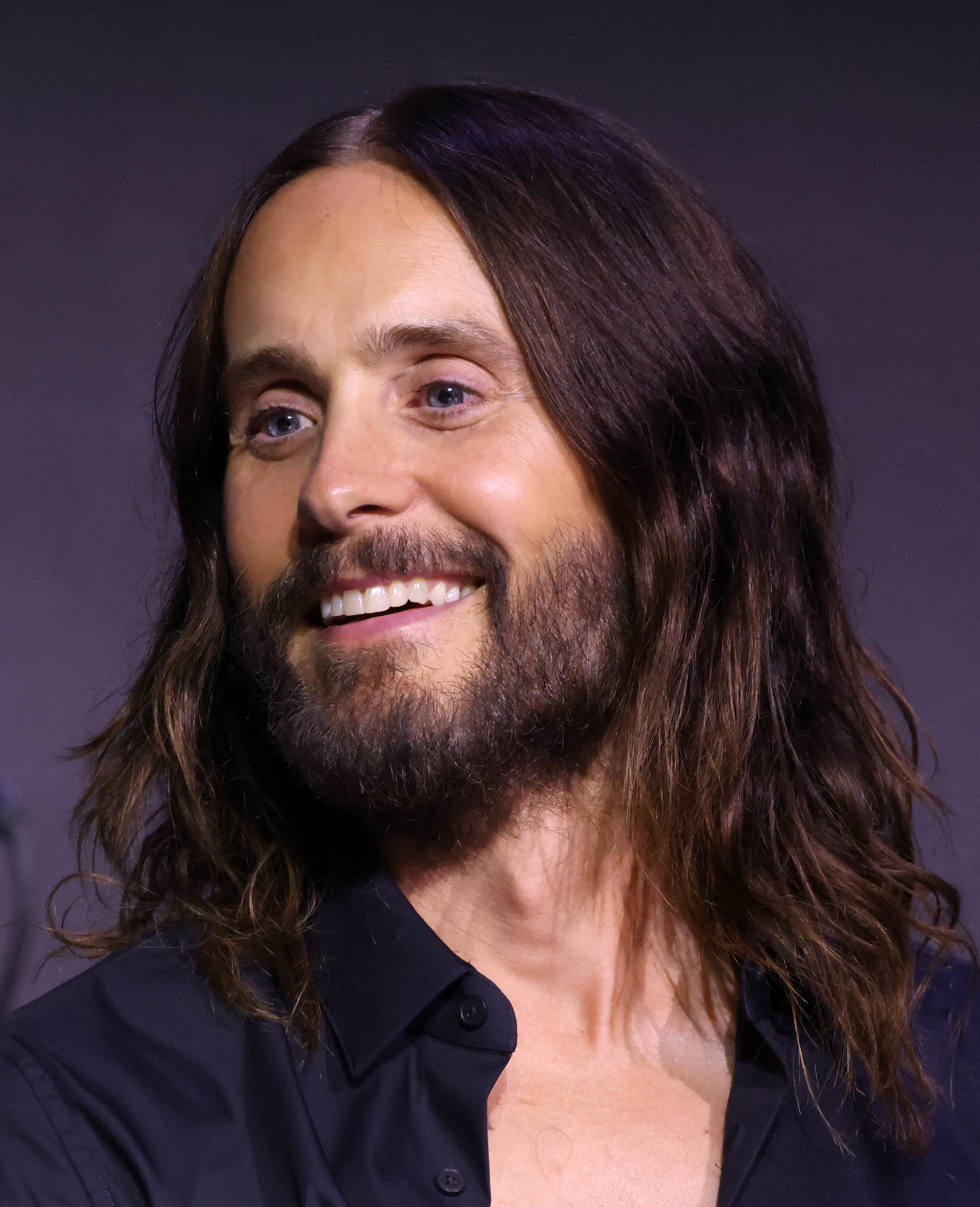
Jared Leto

- December 1
  - Tobin Anderson, basketball player and coach
  - John Schlimm, writer
- December 2 – Harry Berrios, baseball player
- December 4
  - Shannon Briggs, boxer
  - Sara Gideon, politician
- December 5 – Kali Rocha, actress
- December 6
  - Craig Brewer, director
  - Ryan White, HIV victim (d. 1990)
- December 7
  - Vladimir Akopian, Azerbaijani-born chess grandmaster
  - Larisa Alexandrovna Horton, Ukrainian-born journalist, essayist, and poet
  - Dave Arnold, politician (d. 2021)
  - Stephanie D'Abruzzo, actress, puppeteer and singer
- December 8 – Garvin Alston, baseball player
- December 9
  - Clifton Abraham, football player
  - Jacquelynn Berube, weightlifter
  - Chris Boniol, football player
- December 10
  - Bill Baroni, politician
  - Michele Mahone, television entertainment reporter, previously make-up artist and hair stylist
- December 11 – Laura Brod, entrepreneur and politician
- December 13
  - Lynda Blutreich, Olympic javelin thrower
  - Henry Dittman, actor, voice actor, and television host
- December 14 – Brett Boretti, basketball player and coach
- December 15
  - Chris Bingham, racing driver
  - Eric Bjornson, football player
  - Monica Lee Gradischek, actress and voice actress
- December 16
  - Tim Banks, football player and coach
  - Michael McCary, singer
- December 17
  - Beth Barr, Olympic swimmer
  - Joel Berti, actor, coach, and photographer
- December 19
  - Tyson Beckford, model
  - Amy Locane, actress
- December 21
  - Tommie Boyd, football player
  - Natalie Grant, Christian singer/songwriter
  - Brett Scallions singer and frontman for Fuel (1993–2006) (2010–2020)
- December 23
  - Pete Bercich, football player
  - Corey Haim, Canadian-born actor (d. 2010)
- December 24
  - Tamir Bloom, Olympic épée fencer
  - Eric Brooks (politician), politician in West Virginia
- December 26 – Jared Leto, actor and musician, frontman for 30 Seconds to Mars
- December 27
  - Savannah Guthrie, Australian-born television host and anchor
  - Jason Hawes, paranormal investigator and businessman
- December 28
  - Benny Agbayani, baseball player
  - Heidi Blickenstaff, actress
  - Ana Navarro, Nicaraguan-American commentator
  - Frank Sepe, bodybuilder and model
- December 29
  - Ali Abunimah, journalist and activist
  - Assaf Bednarsh, Israeli-born rabbi
- December 30
  - Travis Baptist, baseball player
  - Garrett Byrnes, composer
- December 31 – Brent Barry, basketball player

=== Full date unknown ===
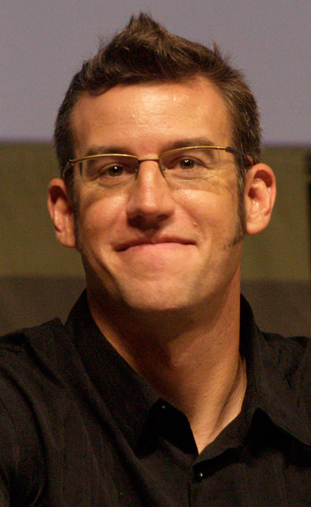
Shane Acker

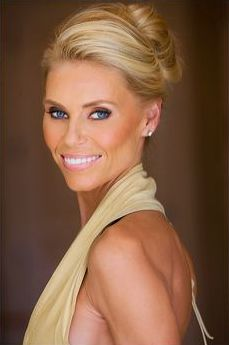
Anna Anka

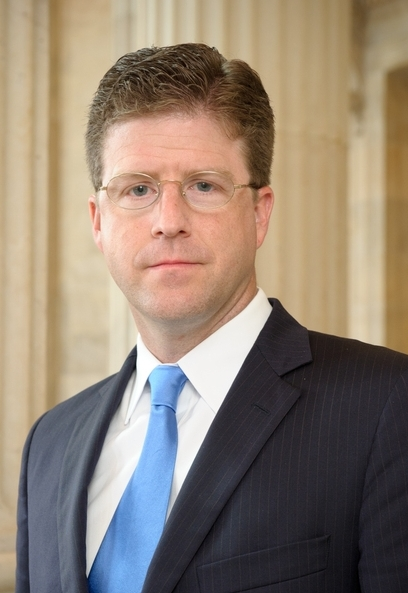
David Barlow

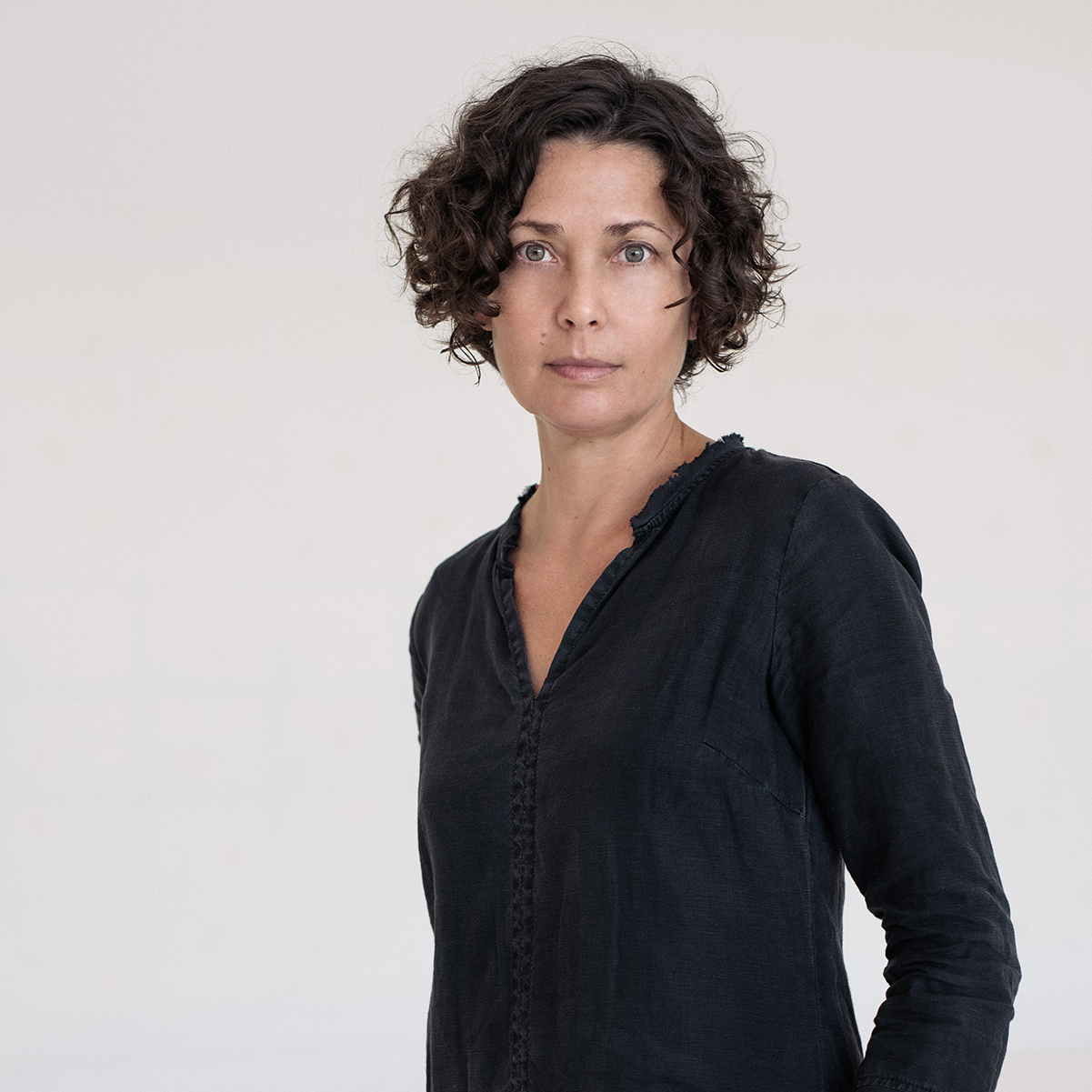
Erika Blumenfeld

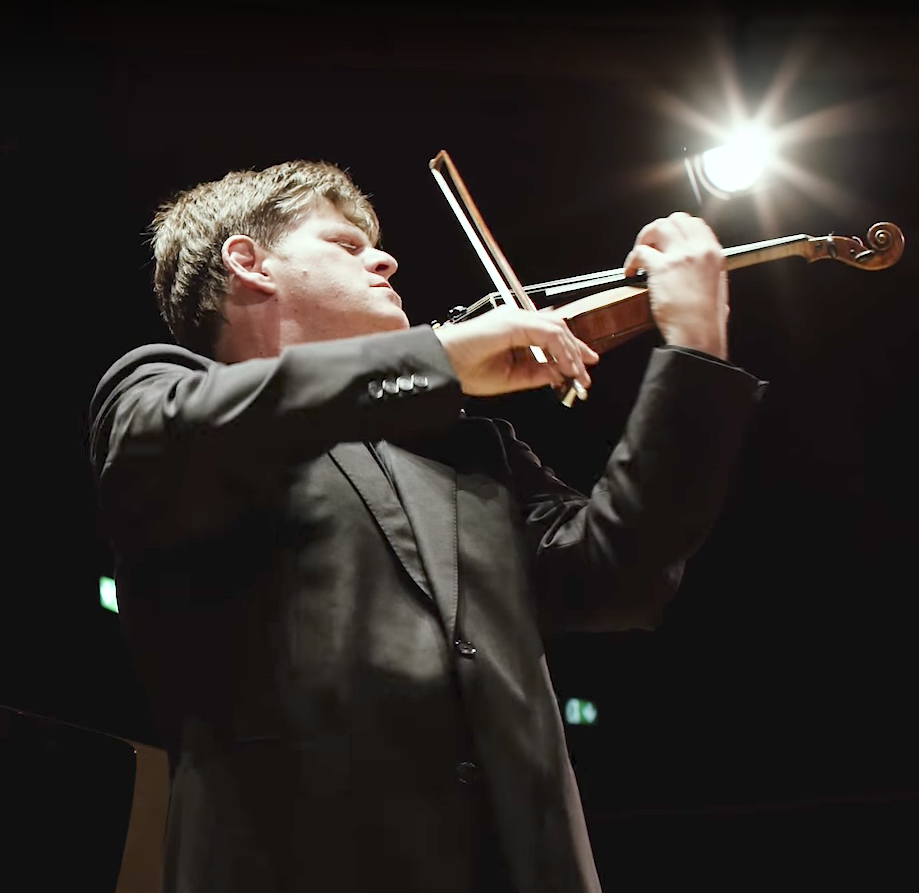
Guy Braunstein

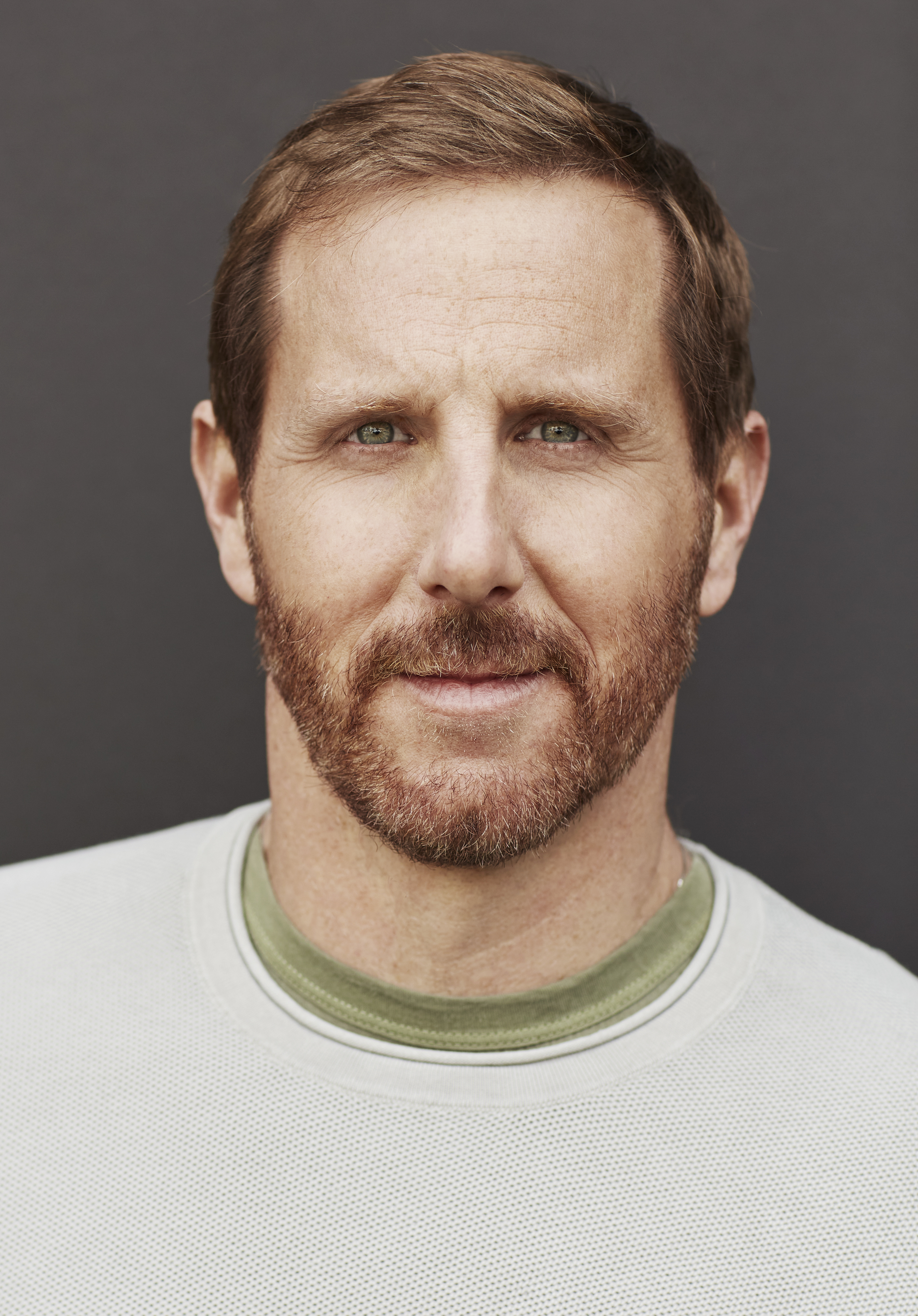
Ethan Brown

- Shaila Abdullah, Pakistani-born author, writer, and designer
- Rony Abovitz, entrepreneur and founder of MAKO Surgical Corp.
- Kerry Abrams, law professor
- Shane Acker, animator, film director, screenwriter, and animation teacher
- Isaac Adamson, author
- C. C. Adcock, blues singer/songwriter and guitarist
- Shahriar Afshar, Iranian-born physicist
- Scott Aikin, philosopher and university professor
- Thomas Albrecht-Schönzart, radiochemist
- Ayad Alkadhi, Iraqi-born artist
- Jason Amerine, U.S. Army Special Forces Lieutenant Colonel and Afghan War veteran
- Blanka Amezkua, Mexican-born artist
- Deno Andrews, billiards player
- Anna Anka, Polish-born Swedish-American model
- Peter Arcidiacono, economist and econometrician
- Chloe Aridjis, novelist and writer
- Tobin Armbrust, filmmaker and producer
- N. Peter Armitage, physicist and university professor
- Dave Arnold, chef
- Peter Askim, composer
- Jami Attenberg, writer and essayist
- Tom Atwood, photographer
- Chris Bachelder, writer
- Meguey Baker, tabletop role-playing game designer, independent publisher, and quilt historian
- József Balogh, Hungarian-born mathematician
- Joseph Baratta, business executive
- Rachel Barkow, University professor
- David Barlow, judge
- Michael C. Barnette, diver, author, photographer, and founder of the Association of Underwater Explorers
- Justin L. Barrett, experimental psychologist
- John Bauer, painter
- Jen Beagin, novelist and writer
- Barbara Bears, ballerina
- Keith Beauchamp, filmmaker
- Michael Bell, artist, screenwriter, and author
- Chris Bender, producer
- Tina Benko, actress
- Michael Betancourt, theorist, historian, and animator
- Irene Beyerlein, materials scientist
- Ion Birch, artist
- Chuck Blasdel, politician
- Tia Blassingame, publisher
- Blevin Blectum, musician and composer
- Jonathan Blow, video game designer and programmer
- Erika Blumenfeld, artist, writer, and researcher
- Kafi D. Blumenfield, civic leader and activist
- Colleen Glenney Boggs, University professor
- Matt Bondurant, novelist
- Eileen Hunt Botting, political theorist
- Andrea Bottner, politician
- Massad Boulos, Lebanese-born businessman
- Raphael Bousso, theoretical physicist and cosmologist
- Carol Bove, artist
- Ben Bradley, philosopher
- John Bramblitt, painter
- Matthew Brannon, artist
- Guy Braunstein, Israeli-born violinist
- Benjamin Breier, health care chief executive
- Isolde Brielmaier, curator and scholar
- Frank Brinsley, radio host
- Pamela Britton, author
- Mia Brownell, painter
- Kyle Bruckmann, composer and oboist
- Drew Brophy, artist
- Chad Broughton, sociologist
- Michelle Browder, artist
- Christopher J. Brown, politician
- Ethan Brown, food executive and founder of Beyond Meat
- Milan Brown, basketball player and coach
- Keith Bunin, dramatist and screenwriter
- Kate Marie Byrnes, diplomat and U.S. Ambassador to North Macedonia (2019–2022)
- Jackson Rohm, country and pop singer (d. 2023)

== Deaths ==
- January 4 – Arthur Ford, psychic, founder of Spiritual Frontiers Fellowship (b. 1896)
- January 10 – Ernie Caceres, saxophonist (b. 1911)
- January 15 – John Dall, actor (b. 1920)
- January 19 – Harry Shields, jazz clarinettist (born 1899).
- January 20 – Broncho Billy Anderson, actor, director, writer, and producer (b. 1880)
- January 21 – Richard Russell Jr., United States Senator from Georgia; President pro tempore during the 91st Congress (b. 1897)
- January 24 – Bill W., co-founder of Alcoholics Anonymous (b. 1897)
- February 3 – Jay C. Flippen, actor (b. 1899)
- February 7 – Dock Boggs, banjo player (b. 1897)
- February 12 – James Cash Penney, businessman (b. 1875)
- February 17 – Adolf A. Berle, lawyer, educator, author and diplomat (b. 1895)
- February 20 – William Lava, composer (b. 1911)
- March 8 – Harold Lloyd, silent comedy filmmaker (b. 1893)
- March 11 – Philo Farnsworth, inventor, television pioneer (b. 1906)
- March 12 – David Burns, actor (b. 1902)
- March 16
  - Bebe Daniels, actress (b. 1901)
  - Thomas E. Dewey, 47th Governor of New York and Republican nominee for president (b. 1902)
- March 22 – Nella Walker, actress and vaudevillian (b. 1886)
- March 24 – George G. O'Connor, general (b. 1914)
- April 3 – Joseph Valachi, gangster (b. 1904)
- April 6 – Igor Stravinsky, composer (b. 1882 in Russia)
- April 15 – Dan Reeves, businessman, owner of the National Football League's Los Angeles Rams (b. 1912)
- April 28 – Lejb Wulman, Polish-Jewish and American physician, social activist, and co-author (b. 1887)
- May 1 – Glenda Farrell, actress (b. 1904)
- May 8 – Frederick Sheffield, Olympic rower (b. 1902)
- May 12 – Tor Johnson, Swedish professional wrestler and actor (b. 1903)
- May 15 – Goose Goslin, baseball player (b. 1900)
- May 19 – Ogden Nash, poet (b. 1902)
- May 26 – Laurence Wild, basketball player and 30th Governor of American Samoa (b. 1890)
- May 28 – Audie Murphy, World War II hero and actor (b. 1925)
- June 1 – Reinhold Niebuhr, theologian (b. 1892)
- June 4 – Joe E. Lewis, comedian, actor, and singer (b. 1902)
- June 7 – Ben Pollack, jazz drummer and bandleader (b. 1903)
- June 9 – Harold Lloyd Jr., actor and singer (b. 1931)
- June 15 – Wendell Meredith Stanley, chemist, Nobel Prize laureate (b. 1904)
- June 18
  - Thomas Gomez, actor (b. 1905)
  - Libby Holman, socialite, singer, actress, and activist (b. 1904)
- June 19 – Garfield Wood, motorboat racer (b. 1880)
- June 30 – Herbert Biberman, screenwriter and film director (b. 1900)
- July 3 – Jim Morrison, singer-songwriter and poet, died in Paris, France (b. 1943)
- July 4
  - August Derleth, author and anthologist (b. 1909)
  - Thomas C. Hart, admiral and politician (b. 1877)
- July 6 – Louis Armstrong, African American jazz trumpeter and actor (b. 1901)
- July 7 – Ub Iwerks, animator, cartoonist, character designer, inventor and special effects technician (b. 1901)
- July 15 – Bill Thompson, radio personality and voice actor (b. 1913)
- July 17 – Cliff Edwards, actor (b. 1895)
- July 19 – Harry W. Hill, admiral (b. 1890)
- July 23 – Van Heflin, actor (b. 1908)
- July 26 – Diane Arbus, photographer (b. 1923)
- August 5 – Royal Rife, inventor (b. 1888)
- August 12
  - James T. Berryman, political cartoonist (b. 1902)
  - Sally Crute, actress (b. 1886)
- August 13 – King Curtis, saxophonist (b. 1934)
- August 15 – Paul Lukas, actor (b. 1894 in Budapest)
- August 21 – George Jackson, author and prison activist (b. 1941)
- August 24 – Carl Blegen, archaeologist (b. 1887)
- August 25 – Ted Lewis, bandleader (b. 1890)
- August 27
  - Margaret Bourke-White, photographer (b. 1904)
  - Bennett Cerf, writer and publisher (b. 1888)
- September 7 – Spring Byington, actress (b. 1886)
- September 11 – Pier Angeli, actress (born 1932)
- September 23 – Billy Gilbert, comedian and actor (b. 1894)
- September 24 – Schlitzie, sideshow performer (b. 1901)
- September 25 – Hugo Lafayette Black, Associate Justice of the Supreme Court of the United States 1937–71 (b. 1886)
- October 2
  - Jessie Arms Botke, artist (b. 1883)
  - Richard H. Jackson, admiral (b. 1866)
- October 3 – Leah Baird, actress (b. 1883)
- October 9 – Billy Costello, voice actor, original voice of Popeye (b. 1898)
- October 11 – Chester Conklin, actor (b. 1888)
- October 12
  - Dean Acheson, 51st United States Secretary of State (b. 1893)
  - Gene Vincent, rockabilly singer (b. 1935)
- October 14 – Claude Beck, cardiac surgeon (b. 1894)
- October 19 – Betty Bronson, actress (b. 1906)
- October 21 – Raymond Hatton, actor (b. 1887)
- October 24 – Carl Ruggles, composer (b. 1876)
- October 29 – Duane Allman, rock guitarist (b. 1946)
- November 10 – Walter Van Tilburg Clark, novelist (b. 1909)
- November 16 – Edie Sedgwick, model and actress (b. 1943)
- November 18 – Junior Parker, blues singer and harmonica player (b. 1932)
- December 7 – Ferdinand Pecora, lawyer (b. 1882 in Sicily)
- December 9 – Ralph Bunche, Nobel diplomat (b. 1904)
- December 11 – Maurice McDonald, entrepreneur and McDonald's co-founder (b. 1902)
- December 18 – Bobby Jones, amateur golfer (b. 1902)
- December 20 – Roy O. Disney, businessman and co-founder of The Walt Disney Company alongside brother Walt Disney (b. 1893)
- December 28 – Max Steiner, Austrian-born American composer and conductor (b. 1888)
- December 29 – Stuart Holmes, actor (b. 1884)
- December 31 – Pete Duel, actor (b. 1940)

== See also ==
- List of American films of 1971
- Timeline of United States history (1970–1989)
