= WSBF-FM =

- Clemson, South Carolina; United States
- Broadcast area: Clemson University
- Frequency: 88.1 MHz

Programming
- Format: Alternative

Ownership
- Owner: Clemson University Board of Trustees

Technical information
- Licensing authority: FCC
- Facility ID: 12000
- Class: A
- ERP: 3,000 watts
- HAAT: 61 meters (200 ft)
- Transmitter coordinates: 34°40′42″N 82°49′15″W

Links
- Public license information: Public file; LMS
- Webcast: Listen live
- Website: wsbf.net

WSBF-FM (88.1 FM) is a college radio station licensed to Clemson, South Carolina. The station is owned by the Clemson University Board of Trustees and serves the Clemson University community. It is entirely student-managed and features an alternative music radio format.

== History ==
WSBF-FM began as a closed-circuit broadcasting facility at 600 kHz on May 1, 1958, with the words "Good Afternoon, this is the high fidelity voice of Clemson College". It made its first over-the-air broadcast on April 1, 1960. The original transmitter unit that powered the station via the electrical system in the dormitories (primarily Johnstone Hall) still exists, and has been preserved. The call letters SBF were the initials of the three student founders of the station, Suggs, Bolick, and Fair. This was also conveniently interpreted as Student Broadcast Facilities. The station quickly became known as "wizz-bif," and in the early days broadcast such shows as Bob Mattison's (the "Voice of Clemson") agricultural shows, which were also broadcast on AM stations in Anderson, Spartanburg, and Columbia. Other early shows included a show broadcast from Harcombe Commons dining hall in the mornings, a "Late, Late" show featuring old standards, and a "Concert Hall" show featuring the classics, "Night Beat," and "East of Midnight." In 1961, adverts in The Tiger, the student newspaper, proclaimed that the station offered the most news of any radio station in the Upstate. By 1965, WSBF had changed format to include "The Frank Howard Show," "Pigskin Preview" show featuring old standards, and a "Concert Hall" show featuring the classics. The purpose was to provide students with educational entertainment, news, and music. Music format ran to the Top 40 model in the mid to late 1960s. The studios were located on the eighth level of the Johnstone Hall complex, two floors above the Loggia.

The next major format change occurred under programming director Woody Culp, changing to "progressive," in the spring semester of 1972. An article in The Tiger on November 12, 1971, states that the decision to change followed a telephone survey of listeners several weeks before, and that the response was favorable. This coincided with the national rise of previously under-valued FM stations all across the dial as a source of "underground" and alternative formats. The strategy at that time was to give heavy airplay to new artists. Off-beat news stories and non-Top 40 music was emphasized. However, shows featuring jazz, classical, oldies, and other speciality formats were also featured. The station broadcast 24 hours per day, some live with student DJs and some pre-recorded tapes.

The current format has evolved from "progressive" to "alternative," a shift taking place in the mid–1980s. The alternative format included progressive, but also includes other genres of music such as classical, rap, jazz, punk, industrial, indie, talk, and many others. The "alternative" name implies alternative in any genre, not just "alternative rock". The current stated goal of WSBF is: "We educate the listener by exposing him/her to new genres and to the leading edge of more familiar genres, such as rock. We play what other stations cannot and do not."

== Notable alumni ==
- Tony Wheeler, aka Tone Hollywood
- David Dondero
