= Lift slab construction =

Method of concrete construction

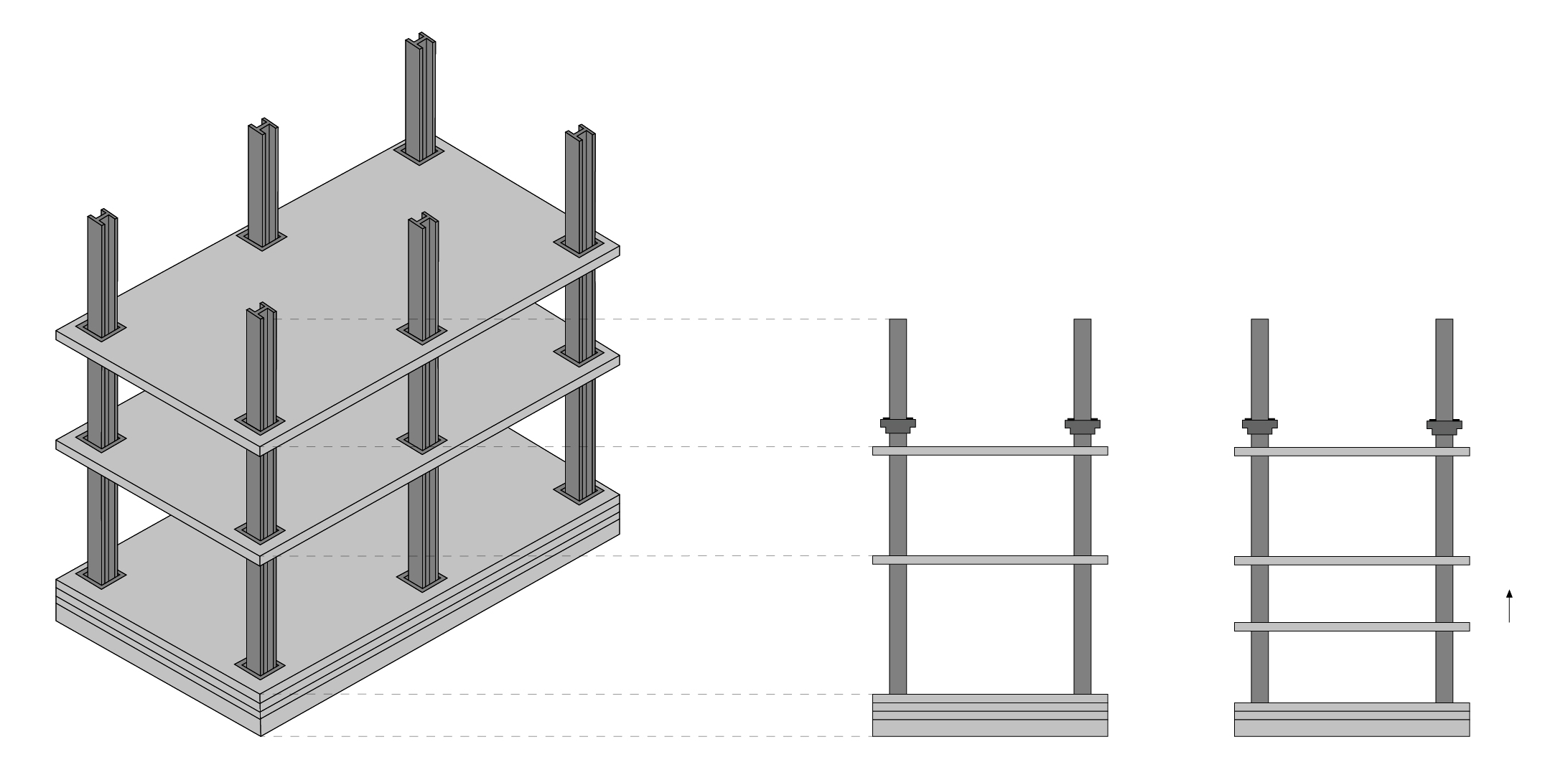
Axon and elevation diagram of lift slab construction

Lift slab construction (also called the Youtz-Slick Method) is a method of constructing concrete buildings by casting the floor or roof slab on top of the previous slab and then raising (jacking) the slab up with hydraulic jacks. This method of construction allows for a large portion of the work to be completed at ground level, negating the need to form floor work in place. The ability to create monolithic concrete slabs makes the lift slab construction technique useful in quickly creating structures with repetitive form work, like parking ramps.

== History ==
This method of construction simultaneously began development in 1948 by both Philip N. Youtz of New York and Thomas B Slick of Texas. Although the first patent for lift slab construction was given to Slick in 1955, the method of construction is commonly referred to as the "Youtz-Slick Method". His patent called for a method that would allow for fabrication to be completed at the ground level, eliminate a large portion of the formwork, create uniform floors of concrete, and reduce the labor to be completed at an elevated level.

== Applications of lift slab construction ==
The method was first used at Trinity University in San Antonio, Texas during the construction of Northup Hall in 1952. Northrup Hall was the first full scale building erected using lift slab construction. Being such, the process drew a crowd of spectators, waiting to see if the structural integrity of the building would hold.

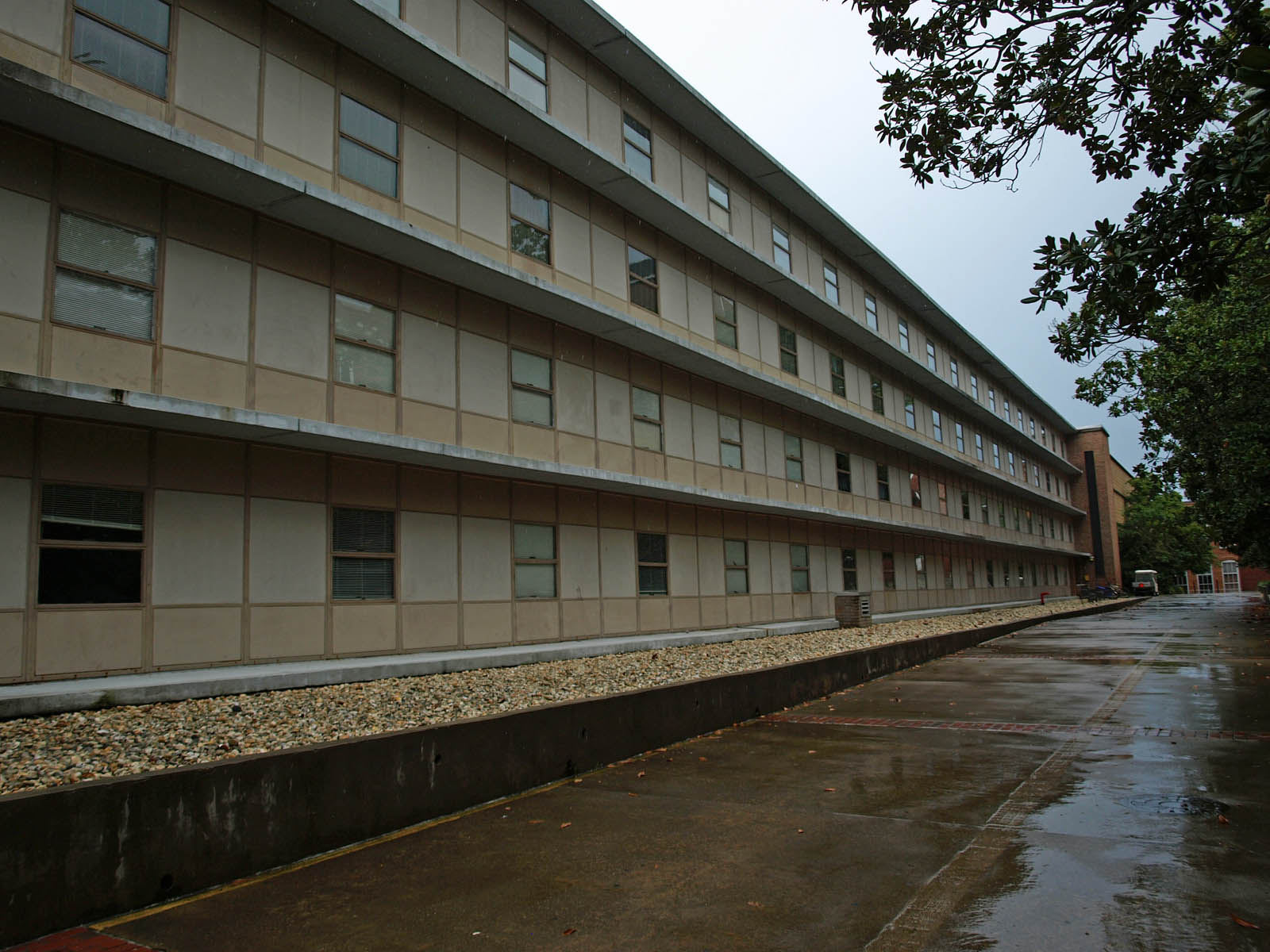
Johnstone Hall, Clemson University

Johnstone Hall, a Clemson University dormitory in Clemson, South Carolina, was erected using this method in 1954, as did Woodrow Wilson High School in the same year. Sections of Johnstone Hall were demolished in the mid-1990s to make way for new suite-style residence halls. Demolition of the remainder of Johnstone Hall, along several attached structures, was completed in 2024.

The building located at 2150 Shattuck Avenue in Berkeley, CA (or First Savings Building) is one example of lift slab construction utilized in the Bay Area in the mid-twentieth century. Built in 1969, the First Savings Building utilizes lift slab construction to support the fourteen story height of the building. The building's structural system consists of a system of trusses from which the various concrete slab floors are hung. In turn, these trusses extend out from two reinforced concrete cores which provide the main structural support for the entirety of the building.

Lift slab construction was also involved in the L'Ambiance Plaza collapse in Bridgeport, Connecticut, in 1987, and resulted in a nationwide federal investigation into this construction technique in the United States, and Connecticut imposed a temporary moratorium on lift slab construction. The failure of the structure has been primarily attributed to instability with the steel columns that were meant to support the floors. Although other factors were involved in the collapse while under construction, it is the insufficient lateral bracing that ultimately caused the structural failure.

Northminster Car Park in Peterborough, England, built using the lift slab technique, was found to be unsafe and beyond economic repair in 2019.

== Process ==
=== Concrete ===
To begin, a concrete slab is first poured on the ground level. Lifting collars are set around each of the columns and cast into place as the slab is poured around them. The lifting collars will later be used to support the slab as it is raised and secured in place. Subsequent floors and the roof are then poured and formed on top of the initial ground slab. Bond breakers are used between each floor plate to allow the slabs to separate as they are raised. Along with reducing the formwork required to create the slabs, slabs can be easily protected from inclement weather since all of the slabs remain together during the curing process.

=== Lifting ===
Once the slabs have been raised to their desired height the lifting collars are welded to the columns, along with shear blocks to support the slab from beneath. To assure the security of a structure during the raising of the slabs, the hydraulic jacks, attached to the top of the columns, use synchronized consoles to lift the slabs at an even rate. Conventional methods of mounting the jacks to the columns require that the jacks are removed before continuing to raise the slabs. More recent approaches utilize welded plates, separated from the columns, to support the jack.

=== Simultaneous floor and wall construction ===
In Latin America, contractors have started to use a form of lift slab construction where load-bearing concrete walls are raised at the same time as the floor slabs. Both the wall panels and the floor slabs are cast on the ground. The walls are attached to the slabs through hinges formed by plastic ropes. As the floors are raised, the walls unfold into place and form the vertical support for the system.

== See also ==
- Tilt slab
- L'Ambiance Plaza collapse
