= June Pilcher =

American psychologist

June J. Pilcher is Alumni Distinguished Professor of Psychology at Clemson University. Her specialization is the study of sleep habits and the effects of sleep deprivation in human beings. She was named a Fellow of the Association for Psychological Science in 2010, and from 2016 through 2018 she was a Distinguished Lecturer of Sigma Xi. In 2018, the National Academy of Sciences honored her with the Jefferson Science Fellowship which allowed her to work at the United States Agency for International Development. In 2019, she hosted a seminar at the University of Nebraska at Kearney Science Café titled That Tricky Brain.
