= David Reinking =

American researcher

David Reinking is a researcher known for his work with formative and design experiments and how literacy is affected by technology. Currently Reinking is a Eugine T. Moore Professor of Teacher Education at Clemson University. He was inducted in the Reading Hall of Fame in 2008 and is a highly regarded in researcher in his field. Prior to his career in higher education, Reinking was an elementary teacher for eight years. After graduating from the University of Minnesota at Minneapolis with his PhD he worked at Rutgers University and later at the University of Georgia.

Reinking has numerous publications that appeal to experienced researchers, graduate students, and classroom teachers. His topics of research are highly appealing and his writing style makes them assessable to a diverse audience.

== Biography ==
David Reinking is a researcher who is known for his work in investigating how literacy is affected by digital forms of reading and writing as well as his formative and design experiments. In 1983 David Reinking graduated from the University of Minnesota, Minneapolis with his Ph.D. and began teaching at Rutgers University's Graduate School of Education as an assistant professor. From 1985 to 1993, he was an assistant professor at University of Georgia's Department of Reading, acting as the interim department head from 1989 to 1990, and becoming a professor and the department head in 1993. In 2003 Reinking made the move from Georgia to Clemson University as a Eugene T. Moore Professor of Teacher Education (distinguished professor) in the Eugene T. Moore School of Education, which is his current location. Before his transition to higher education, Reinking was an elementary school classroom teacher for 8 years.

In addition to university teaching, Reinking was a principal investigator for the National Reading Research Center at the University of Georgia/University of Maryland, College Park, from 1992 to 1997. He was the editor for the ''Journal of Literacy Research, a peer-reviewed journal published by the National Reading Conference from 1994-2001 and co-editor of Reading Research Quarterly, a peer-reviewed journal published by the International Reading Association from 2001 to 2007. From 2001 to present Reinking has been the director of the Maymester Study Abroad Program in Capri, Italy. In 2008 Reinking was inducted into the Reading Hall of Fame. Reinking was elected as the vice-president of the National Reading Conference in 2007 and is currently the president

== Research history ==
Reinking's research in the early stages of his career focused on computer-based reading instruction and evolved to include teacher professional development, formative and design experiments, and digital reading and writing's effects on literacy and literacy development. His most recent publication, On Formative and Design Experiments: Approaches to Language and Literacy Research, a collaboration with Barbara A. Bradley, is written to meet the needs of both experienced researchers and graduate students preparing to collect data for dissertation purposes. The book is organized into four chapters, beginning with a discussion of what formative and design experiments consist of and why they are useful. The methods of formative and design experiments are examined with specific questions discussed, such as how to set up an appropriate site for research, when the formative phase should end, and troubleshooting guidelines. Chapter three provides quality examples of formative and design experiments and chapter four guides the reader to determine if formative or design experiments are appropriate for their research interests. This book is written with clear language to excite beginning researchers to discover a new method of literacy research and goes deep enough into the content to stretch the mind of experienced researchers.

"A Formative Experiment Investigating the Use of Multimedia Book Reviews to Increase Elementary Students' Independent Reading", a collaborative research study with Janet Watkins, was published in the 2000 summer edition of Reading Research Quarterly. This formative experiment captures the interest of classroom teachers and researchers because it is written with practical language to allow teachers to implement the interventions researched into their own classrooms and it also dissects the formative design of the study to appeal to researchers. This study implemented a computer program for fourth and fifth grade students to use as a medium for writing book reviews in lieu of traditional paper/pencil book reports as a means of increasing students' desire to engage in independent reading on their own time. The results of this study include qualitative analysis collected from observations, interviews, journals, and focus groups as well as quantitative data collected from attitude surveys, and parent questionnaire.

== Selected works ==
Latest publications of Professor Reinking can be found in GoogleScholar

- Beach, R., Carter, A., East, D., Johnston, P., Reinking, D., Smith-Burke, T., & Stahl, N. (2007). Resisting commercial influences on accessing scholarship: What literacy researchers need to know and do. In D. W. Rowe, R. T. Jimenez, D. L. Compton, D. K. Dickinson, Y. Kim, K. M. Leander, & V. J. Risko (Eds.), 56th yearbook of the National Reading Conference, (pp. 96–124). National Reading Conference. Milwaukee, WI.
- Labbo, L.D., & Reinking, D. (2000). Once upon an electronic story time. The New Advocate, 13(1), 25–32.
- Labbo, L.D., & Reinking, D. (1999). Negotiating the multiple realities of technology in literacy research and instruction. Reading Research Quarterly, 34, 478–492.
- McKenna, M.C., Reinking, D., & Labbo, L. D., & Kieffer, R. D. (1999). The electronic transformation of literacy and its implications for the struggling reader. Reading and Writing Quarterly, 15, 111–126.
- Reinking, D. (2007). "Toward a good or better understanding of best practice". Journal of Curriculum and Instruction.
- Reinking, D. (2004). Why literacy researchers have little influence on policy and what to do about it: A commentary. In J. Worthy, B. Maloch, J. V. Hoffman, & D. L. Schallert (Eds.). 53rd yearbook of the national reading conference (pp. 296–307). Oak Creek, WI: National Reading Conference.
- Reinking, D., & Bradley, B.A. (2008). On formative and design experiments. New York: Teachers College Press.
- Reinking, D.; Eakle, A. J.; Hubbard, B.; Hung, H. T.; Lim, H. W.; Park, M. (November 2003). "New technologies of reading and writing: A database modeling a dynamic, collaborative scholarly resource. Reading OnLine". Archived from the original on 2012-02-13.
- Reinking, D., Labbo, L.D., & McKenna, M.C. (2000). From assimilation to accommodation: A developmental framework for integrating digital technologies into literacy research and instruction. Journal of Research in Reading, 23, 110–122.
- Reinking, D., & Watkins, J. (2000). A formative experiment investigating the use of multimedia book reviews to increase elementary students’ independent reading. Reading Research Quarterly, 35, 384–419.
- Tao, L., & Reinking, D. (2000). E-mail and literacy education. Reading & Writing Quarterly, 16, 169–174.
