= Ramakrishna Podila =

Indian-born American physicist and nanomaterials researcher

Ramakrishna Podila is an Indian-born American physicist and nanomaterials researcher. He is currently an associate professor of physics in the Department of Physics and Astronomy at Clemson University and is the director of the Clemson Nano-bio lab. He is known for his interdisciplinary research at the interface of physics, biology, and nanoscience. His lab integrates the principles of condensed matter physics, optical spectroscopy, and physiological chemistry to understand physics at the nanoscale and nano-bio interfaces. He became a fellow of the Royal Society of Chemistry (FRSC) in July 2024, a fellow of the Institute of Physics (FInstP) in May 2025, and a fellow of the American Physical Society in October 2026. His American Physical Society fellow citation reads, "For fundamental contributions to defect- and interface-controlled transport physics in low-dimensional energy materials — enabling advances in thermoelectric conversion, triboelectric nanogenerators, supercapacitors, batteries, and photonic diodes." He currently serves as the chair of the topical group on energy research and applications (GERA) at the American Physical Society.

His work led to new discoveries at the nanoscale such as: 1) time-reversal symmetry breaking with non-linear optical diodes, 2) a novel "wireless" tribo-electric generator that is capable of converting waste mechanical energy into electricity and transmit it wirelessly for storage 3) alleviating quantum capacitance effects in graphene 4) smartphone based rapid inexpensive biosensors for resource-limited settings, and 4) elucidating the origin of nano-toxicity from a fundamental quantum electronic energy levels standpoint.

== Research work ==
Podila's research made many strides in fundamental understanding and applications of nanomaterials in energy, health, and photonics.

=== Energy conversion and storage ===
Podila's group has been attempting to develop highly efficient triboelectric nanogenerators (TENGs) for converting waste mechanical energy into useful electric power; in addition, his group focuses on engineering defects and dopants in nanomaterials to achieve batteries (Li-ion, Li-sulfur, and Al-ion) and supercapacitors (based on nanocarbons and their hybrids with electrochemically active polymers) with high-energy and high-power densities. His work in this area led to many discoveries such as alleviation of quantum capacitance in graphene, wireless tribo-electric nanogenerators, inexpensive TENGs, and novel silicon electrodes for Li-ion batteries among other things. Through their research at the nanoscale, Podila's group has demonstrated the use of defects (including interfaces) for achieving novel functionalities. More importantly, his group successfully translated their research into scalable devices.

=== Nanotoxicity and nanomedicine ===
Podila's group is presently identifying mechanisms of nanotoxicity with an emphasis on nanoparticle-protein interactions and their influence on physiological responses to ultimately develop benign nanoparticles for medical applications. Podila's collaborative work previously developed an atom-thick coating for preventing blood clots on stents, use carbon nanotubes as drug delivery vehicles for cancer etc. Recently, Podila's work (in collaboration with J. M. Brown group at UC Denver) showed how atomic defects in materials could elicit varying physiological responses by linking nanomaterials, quantum mechanics, and toxicity studies. His work also revealed the fundamental mechanisms by which plaque formation in many diseases such as diabetes etc. can be stopped using nanomaterials.

=== Biosensing and imaging ===
Podila's group developed novel surface plasmon coupled emission platforms (some of this work done in collaboration with Sri Sathya Sai Institute of Higher Learning) with high sensitivity and specificity for diagnosing low abundance biomarkers. Most importantly, this work led to cheap and inexpensive smartphone sensors for rapidly detecting TB without the need to wait for bacterial cultures. His group invented a new printer paper-based analyte-induced disruption assay that is useful for rapidly detecting antibodies, cancer markers etc. Podila also developed novel fluorescent nanoparticles (doped ZnO, nanocarbons) through three-photon absorption (3PA) for bioimaging of cancer and image-guided surgery.

== Selected publications ==
- Podila, R., Queen, W., Nath, A., Arantes, J. T., Schoenhalz, A. L., Fazzio, A., ... & Rao, A. M. (2010). Origin of FM ordering in pristine micro-and nanostructured ZnO. Nano letters, 10(4), 1383–1386.
- Podila, R., Moore, T., Alexis, F., & Rao, A. M. (2013). Graphene coatings for enhanced hemo-compatibility of nitinol stents. RSC advances, 3(6), 1660–1665.
- Podila, R., Brown, J. M., Kahru, A., & Rao, A. M. (2014). Illuminating nano-bio interactions: A spectroscopic perspective. Mrs Bulletin, 39(11), 990–995.
- Zhu, J., Childress, A. S., Karakaya, M., Dandeliya, S., Srivastava, A., Lin, Y., ... & Podila, R. (2016). Defect‐engineered graphene for high‐energy‐and high‐power‐density supercapacitor devices. Advanced Materials, 28(33), 7185–7192.
- Wei, P. C., Bhattacharya, S., He, J., Neeleshwar, S., Podila, R., Chen, Y. Y., & Rao, A. M. (2016). The intrinsic thermal conductivity of SnSe. Nature, 539(7627), E1-E2.
- Dong, Y., Chertopalov, S., Maleski, K., Anasori, B., Hu, L., Bhattacharya, S., ... & Podila, R. (2018). Saturable absorption in 2D Ti_{3}C_{2} MXene thin films for passive photonic diodes. Advanced Materials, 30(10), 1705714.
- Dong, Y., Mallineni, S. S. K., Maleski, K., Behlow, H., Mochalin, V. N., Rao, A. M., ... & Podila, R. (2018). Metallic MXenes: A new family of materials for flexible triboelectric nanogenerators. Nano Energy, 44, 103–110.
- Mallineni, S. S. K., Dong, Y., Behlow, H., Rao, A. M., & Podila, R. (2018). A wireless triboelectric nanogenerator. Advanced Energy Materials, 8(10), 1702736.

== Honors ==
Podila was named as a Fellow of the Royal Society of Chemistry (FRSC) in July 2024. Podila became a certified fellow of the Institute for Advanced Physics in 2020. He is actively involved in education and outreach through science workshops for K-12.
