= Clemson University =

Public university in Clemson, South Carolina, US

- Former name: Clemson Agricultural College of South Carolina (1889–1964)
- Type: Public land-grant research university
- Established: 1889; 137 years ago
- Accreditation: SACS
- Academic affiliations: ORAU; sea-grant
- Endowment: $1.24 billion (2025)
- President: Benjamin C. Ayers
- Provost: J. Cole Smith
- Faculty: 2,023
- Administrative staff: 4,616
- Students: 29,545 (Fall 2025)
- Undergraduates: 24,060 (Fall 2025)
- Postgraduates: 5,485 (Fall 2025)
- Location: Clemson, South Carolina postal address, United States; 34°40′42″N 82°50′21″W
- Campus: 1,400 acres (570 ha); Large suburb
- Other campuses: Charleston; Greenville
- Newspaper: The Tiger
- Colors: Orange and regalia
- Nickname: Tigers
- Sporting affiliations: NCAA Division I FBS – ACC
- Mascots: The Tiger; The Cub
- Website: clemson.edu

Clemson University (/ˈklɛmp.sən, ˈklɛm.zən/^{[note a]}) is a public land-grant research university near Clemson, South Carolina, United States. Founded in 1889, Clemson is the second-largest university by enrollment in South Carolina. For the fall 2025 semester, the university enrolled a total of 24,060 undergraduate students and 5,485 graduate students, and the student/faculty ratio was 16:1.

Clemson's 1,400-acre (570 ha) campus is in the foothills of the Blue Ridge Mountains. The campus now borders Lake Hartwell, which was formed by the dam completed in 1962.

Clemson University consists of nine colleges: Agriculture, Forestry and Life Sciences; Architecture, Art and Construction; Arts and Humanities; Behavioral, Social and Health Sciences; Engineering, Computing and Applied Sciences; Education; the Wilbur O. and Ann Powers College of Business; the Harvey S. Peeler Jr. College of Veterinary Medicine; and Science. Clemson University is classified among "R1: Doctoral Universities – Very high research activity."

== History ==
=== Beginnings ===
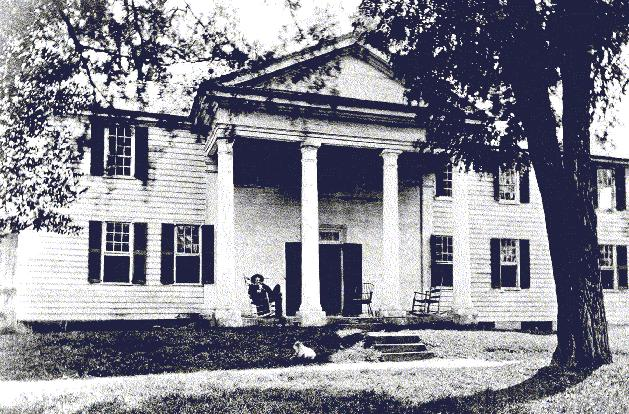
Fort Hill, photographed in 1887, was the home of John C. Calhoun and later Thomas Green Clemson and is at the center of the university campus.

Thomas Green Clemson, the university's founder, came to the foothills of South Carolina in 1838, when he married Anna Maria Calhoun, daughter of John C. Calhoun, the South Carolina politician and seventh U.S. Vice President. Through the Calhoun family, Clemson became an owner of enslaved persons on the family plantation that was to become the heart of the future university. When Clemson died on April 6, 1888, he bequeathed the Fort Hill plantation and most of his estate, which he inherited from his wife, in his will to be used to establish a college that would teach scientific agriculture and the mechanical arts to South Carolinians. His decision was largely influenced by the future South Carolina Governor Benjamin Tillman. Tillman lobbied the South Carolina General Assembly to create the school as an agricultural institution for the state, and the resolution passed by only one vote.

In his will, Clemson explicitly stated he wanted the school to be modeled after what is now Mississippi State University.

=== Clemson Agricultural College of South Carolina ===
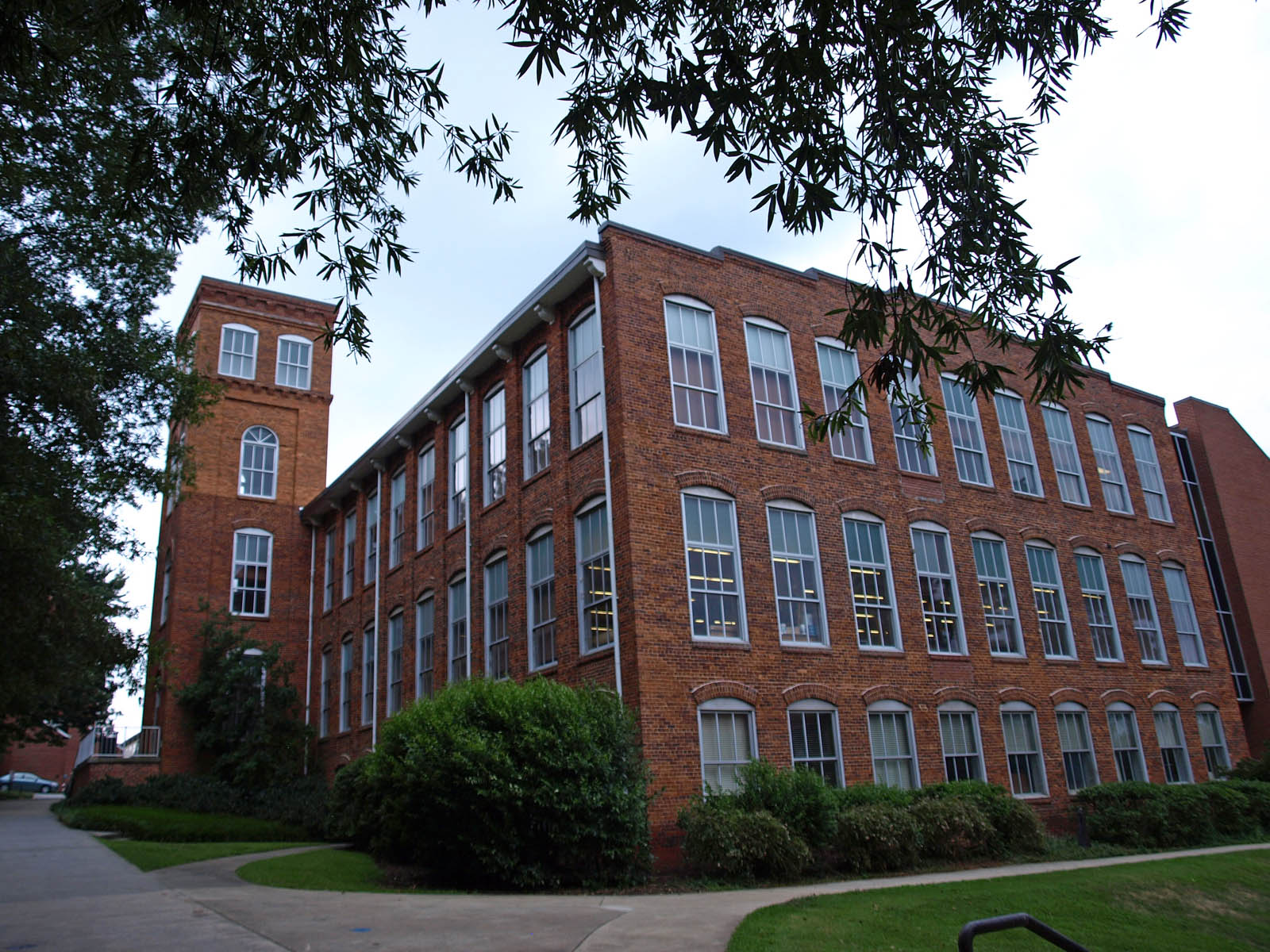
Godfrey Hall, constructed in 1897, formerly housed the Textile Department.

In November 1889, South Carolina Governor John Peter Richardson III signed the bill, thus establishing the Clemson Agricultural College of South Carolina. As a result, federal funds for agricultural education from the Morrill Land-Grant Colleges Act and the Hatch Act of 1887 were transferred from South Carolina College (today, the University of South Carolina) to Clemson. Construction of the college began with Hardin Hall in 1890 and then main classroom buildings in 1891. Convict laborers, some as young as 12 years old, built many of the original buildings on campus. The prisoners who built Clemson were almost all black, and over 500 of their names are recorded. South Carolina used more convict labor to build its universities than any other state.

Henry Aubrey Strode was the first president of Clemson from 1890 to 1893, hiring faculty and designing the curriculum. Edwin Craighead succeeded Strode in 1893. Clemson Agricultural College formally opened in July 1893 with an initial enrollment of 446. The common curriculum of the first incoming students was English, history, botany, mathematics, physics, and agriculture. Until 1955, the college was also an all-white male military school.

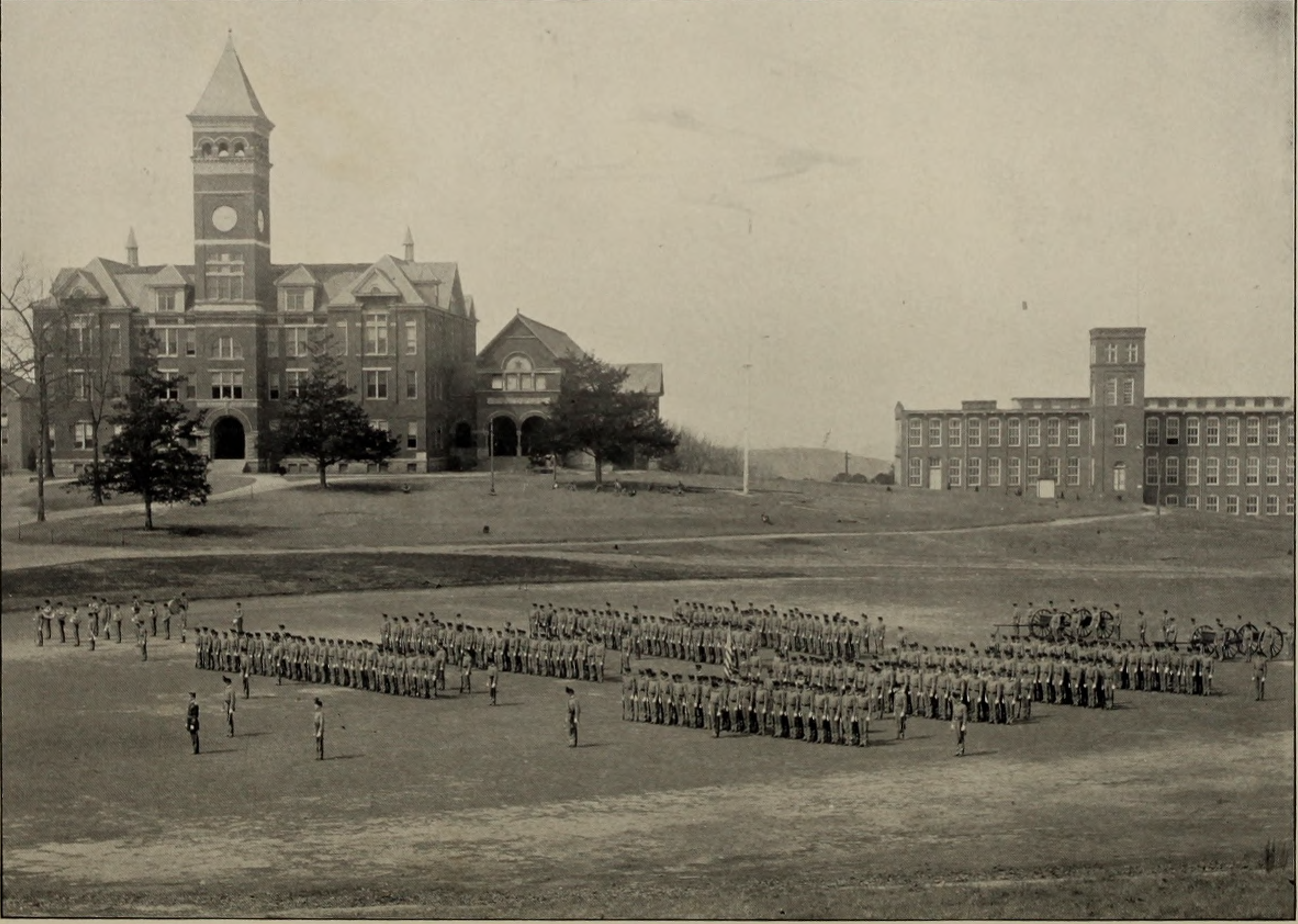
Corps of Cadets at Clemson College in 1904

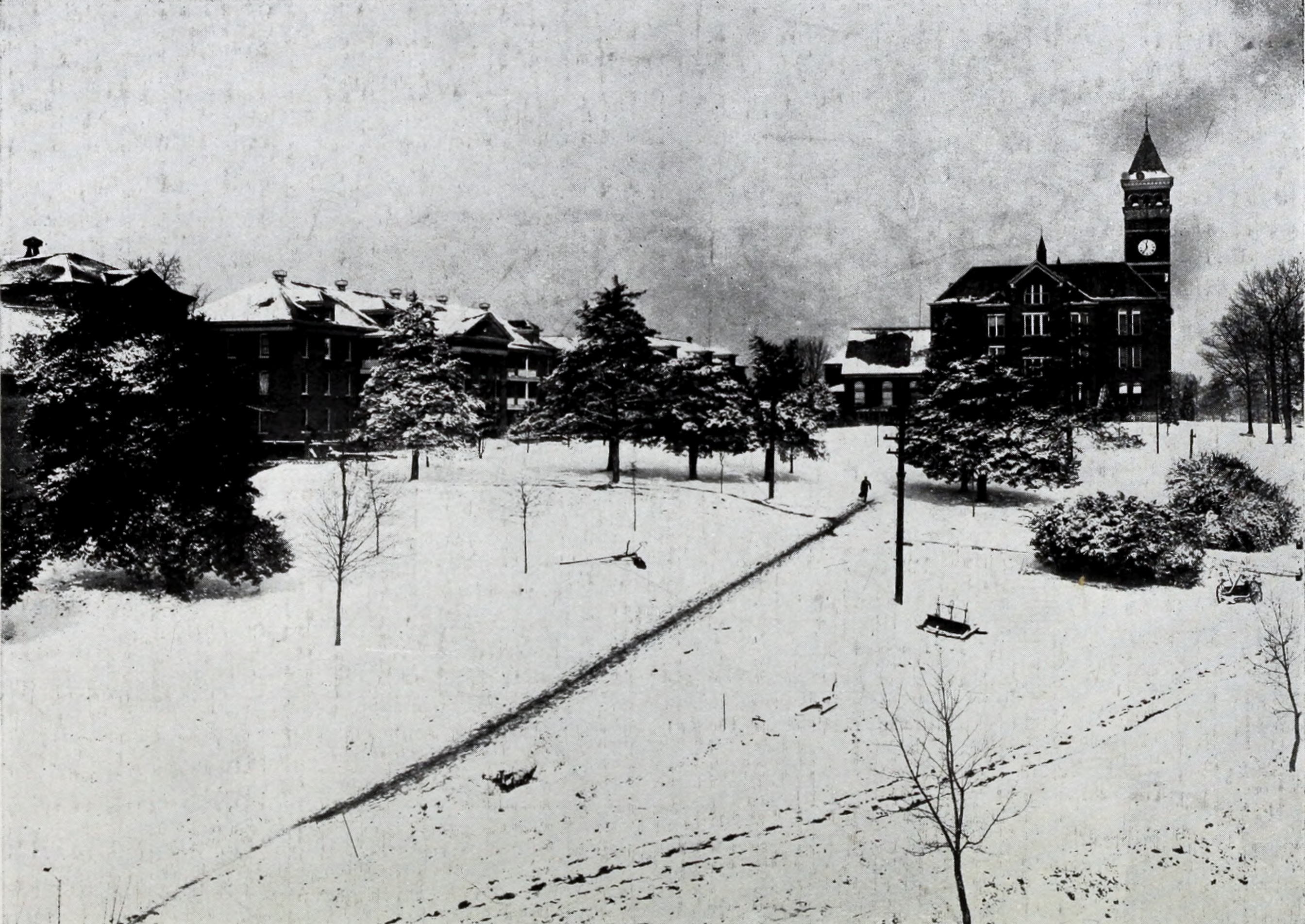
Snow at Clemson College, 1914

On May 22, 1894, the main building (Tillman Hall) was destroyed by a fire, which consumed the library, classrooms, and offices. Tillman Hall was rebuilt in 1894 and is still standing today. The first graduating class of Clemson was in 1896, and they had degrees in mechanical-electrical engineering and agriculture. Clemson's first football team began in 1896, led by trainer Walter Riggs. Henry Hartzog, a graduate of The Citadel, The Military College of South Carolina, became president of Clemson in 1897. Hartzog created a textile department in 1898. Clemson became the first Southern school to train textile specialists. Hartzog expanded the curriculum with more industrialization skills such as foundry work, agriculture studies, and mechanics. In 1902, a large student walkout over the use of rigid military discipline escalated tensions between students and faculty, forcing Hartzog to resign. Patrick Mell succeeded Hartzog from 1902 to 1910.

Following the resignation of Mell in 1910, former Clemson Tigers football coach Walter Riggs became president of Clemson from 1910 to 1924. The Holtzendorff Hall, originally the Holzendorff YMCA, was built in 1914 designed by Rudolph E. Lee of the first graduating class of Clemson in 1896. In 1915, Riggs Field was dedicated after Walter Riggs and is the Clemson Tigers men's soccer home field. During World War I, enrollment in Clemson declined. In 1917, Clemson formed a Reserve Officers' Training Corps, and in 1918, a Student Army Training Corps was formed. Effects of World War I made Clemson hire the first female faculty due to faculty changes. Riggs accepted a six-month army educational commission in 1919 overseas in France, leaving Samuel Earle as acting president. On March 10, 1920, a large walkout occurred protesting unfair "prison camp" style military discipline. The 1920 walkout led to the creation of a Department of Student Affairs. On January 22, 1924, Riggs died on a business trip to Washington, DC, leaving Earle the acting president. In October 1924, another walkout of around 500 students occurred when Earle rejected their demands for better food, the dismissal of mess officer Harcombe, and the reinstatement of their senior class president. The 1924 walkout resulted in 23 students being dismissed and 112 suspended.

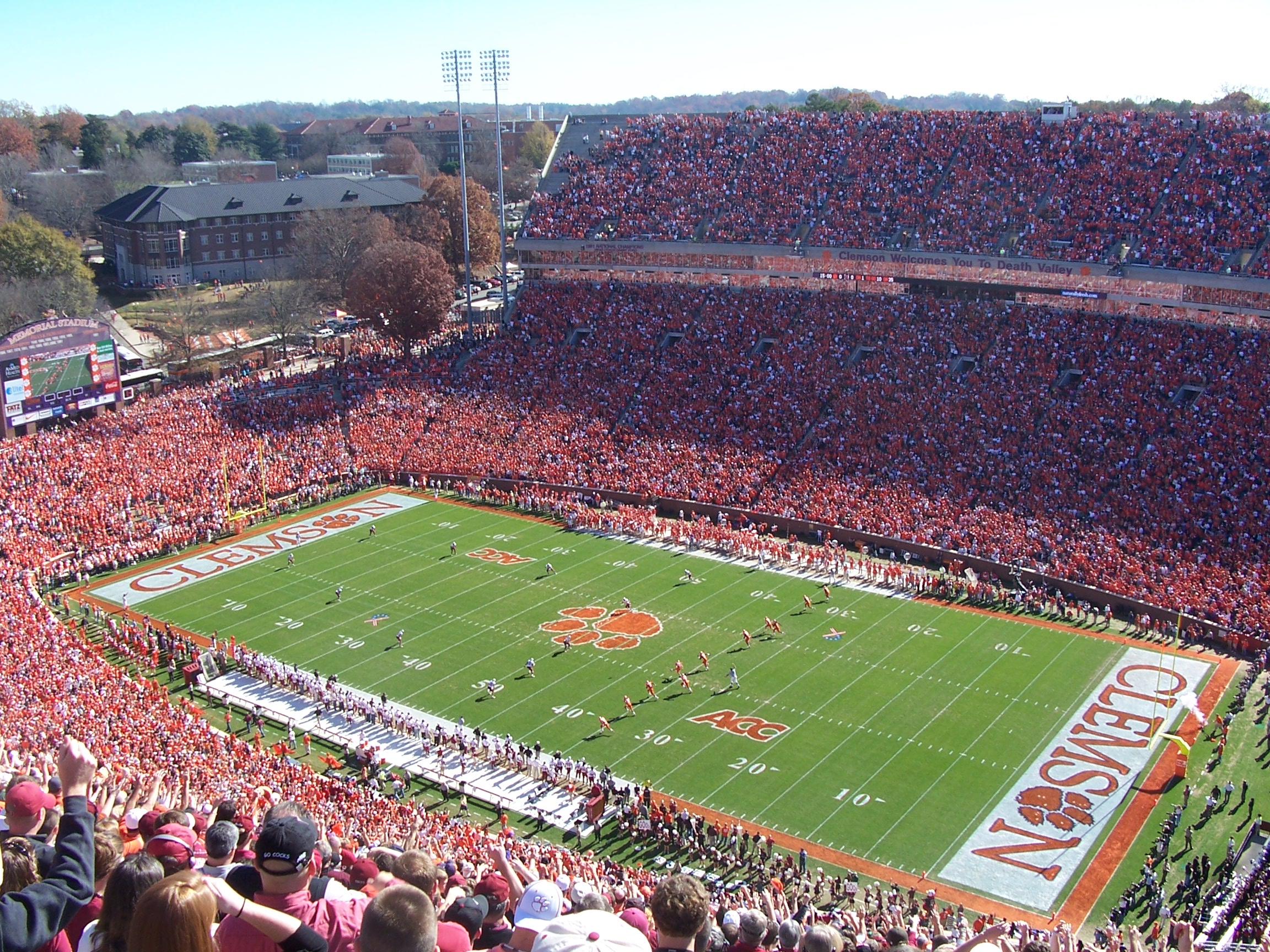
Clemson Memorial Stadium in 2006

On April 1, 1925, a fire destroyed the interior of the agricultural building and its many research projects and an agricultural museum. The exterior of the building survived, leading to the construction of Sikes Hall to hold the library from Tillman Hall. On May 27, 1926, Mechanical Hall was destroyed in a fire. Present-day Freeman Hall, built in 1926, was the reconstructed shop building. In 1928, Riggs Hall was established in honor of Walter Riggs. President Enoch Sikes increased student enrollment by over 1,000 students and expanded the degree programs with an addition of the first graduate degree. The Department of Arts and Sciences was formed in 1926 with the addition of modern language programs. Programs at Clemson were reorganized into six schools of agriculture, chemistry, engineering, general science, textiles, and vocational studies. In 1927, Clemson received accreditation from the Association of Secondary Schools and Colleges of the Southern States.

During the Great Depression, student enrollment and income declined. The New Deal brought needed construction to the campus under the Works Progress Administration with new dormitories to relieve the housing shortages. Long Hall, Sirrine Hall, and 29,625 acres of privately owned farmland were acquired by Clemson through federal funding. Agricultural engineers of Clemson diversified with the Clemson Agricultural Extension to educate farmers on soil conservation and crop storage techniques during the Great Depression. Robert Poole became the first Clemson alumnus to be president in 1940. On September 19, 1942, Memorial Stadium was formally opened as the new stadium for the Clemson Tigers football team previously played on Riggs Field since 1915.

During World War II, more than 6,500 students were sent overseas to the military. As a result of the Clemson ROTC, around 5,850 were commissioned officers. The class of 1943 had a historical low of 343 graduates. By the end of the war, 376 Clemson students had been killed in it.

=== Becoming civilian and coeducational and desegregated ===
By 1948, many black applicants had attempted to gain admittance to Clemson and desegregate the university, but segregated admissions policies had blocked them all. Admissions forms asked applicants to mark their race, and some black applicants responded with "Negro", while others wrote "American" or did not answer the question. In 1947, one black student had successfully gained admittance, though he answered the question with "Negro"; the school blamed this on a clerical error, and the registrar reported that "for various reasons...[he] did not pursue his admission." The next year, the university's board met to discuss how they would handle increasing pressure to desegregate, which was coming from NAACP lawsuits against other schools, increasing numbers of Clemson applications from black students, and rising moral indignation from religious groups. The board decided to keep Clemson segregated, directing black applicants to South Carolina A&M, instead.

In 1955, Clemson underwent a major restructuring and was transformed into a "civilian" status for students. It began admitting white women; the university was still segregated. In 1957, Margaret Marie Snider became the first woman to earn a degree. Initially, the university had many extra rules that only applied to women, but these were removed by the middle of the 1970s.

Over the 1950s, while court decisions desegregated other schools, Clemson's rejection of black applicants including Spencer Bracy, Edward Bracy, and John L. Gainey became newsworthy. In 1963, the university admitted its first African-American student, Harvey Gantt, who later was elected as mayor of Charlotte, North Carolina. Gantt and Cornelius Fludd, along with many other black students, had applied to transfer to Clemson in 1961 and been rejected, but Gantt and Fludd's persistent work with the NAACP pushed the school to consider its applications more deeply. In 1962, Gantt and the NAACP filed suit against the university, and in 1963, the U.S. Court of Appeals for the Fourth Circuit directed Clemson to admit Gantt. Clemson's leaders warned students to remain nonviolent as Gantt registered under press scrutiny. The rest of the process went relatively smoothly, unlike desegregation efforts that turned violent like the Ole Miss Riot.

Gantt enrolled in 1963, and later recalled that he was harassed by other students for the first few days and later sometimes insulted, but never directly confronted. He attributed this to his large build and president R.C. Edwards' stern warnings against violence. Edwards asked Gantt to avoid student dances, but Gantt attended them and football games. He contrasted his experience with that of James Meredith at the University of Mississippi, and the students who desegregated the University of South Carolina and the University of Georgia.

Also in 1963, Lucinda Brawley became the first black woman admitted to Clemson and the second black student to attend, and Larry Nazry transferred in the semester after.

=== Clemson University ===
In 1964, the college was renamed Clemson University as the state legislature formally recognized the school's expanded academic offerings and research pursuits.

In 1992 the City of Clemson had proposed that Clemson University become a part of the city. The university received a plan on joining the city boundaries and, in 1993, decided not to go through with the plan.

== Campus ==
The Campus of Clemson University is outside of, and adjacent to, the Clemson city limits, in unincorporated Pickens County. Therefore, the university does not have to abide by City of Clemson municipal ordinances nor receive permission to do any undertaking from the City of Clemson. The South Carolina General Assembly designated Clemson University as a "municipal corporation" in 1894.

This campus was originally the site of U.S. Vice President John C. Calhoun's plantation, named Fort Hill. The plantation passed to his daughter, Anna, and son-in-law, Thomas Green Clemson. On Clemson's death in 1888, he willed the land to the state of South Carolina for the creation of a public university.

The university was founded in 1889, and three buildings from the initial construction still exist today: Hardin Hall (built in 1890), Main Building (later renamed Tillman Hall) (1894), and Godfrey Hall (1898). Other periods of large expansion occurred in 1936–1938 when eight new buildings were constructed, and the late 1950s through 1970, when no fewer than 25 buildings were constructed, most in a similar architectural style.

The campus area first appeared as a census-designated place (CDP) in the 2020 Census with a population of 7,311.

== Academics ==
=== National ranking ===
Per U.S. News & World Report, Clemson ranks 75th overall in the United States among national universities.

=== Undergraduate admissions ===
Undergraduate admissions statistics
- 2025 entering class
- Admit rate: 42.4% (▼ −19.5)
- Yield rate: 18.5% (▼ −5.2)

Test scores middle 50%^{[i]}
- SAT Total: 1240–1400 (among 39% of FTFs)
- ACT Composite: 28–32 (among 21% of FTFs)

The 2022 annual ranking of U.S. News & World Report categorizes Clemson as 'more selective'. For the Class of 2029 (enrolled Fall 2025), Clemson received 64,805 applications and accepted 27,498 (42.4%). Of those accepted, 5,084 enrolled, a yield rate (the percentage of accepted students to choose to attend the university) of 18.5%. Clemson’s freshman retention rate is 94.1%, with 87.5% going on to graduate within six years.

The enrolled first-year class of 2028 had the following standardized test scores: the middle 50% range (25th–75th percentile) of SAT scores was 1250–1400, while the middle 50% range of ACT scores was 28–32.

Fall first-time freshman statistics
	2025	2024	2023	2022	2021	2020	2019	2018
Applicants	64,805	61,517	60,122	52,819	47,007	28,600	29,070	28,845
Admits	27,498	23,586	22,879	22,704	23,138	17,715	14,900	13,613
Admit rate	42.4	38.3	38.1	42.9	49.2	61.9	51.3	47.2
Enrolled	5,084	4,880	4,494	4,588	4,589	4,199	3,932	3,792
Yield rate	18.5	20.7	19.6	20.2	19.8	23.7	26.4	27.9
ACT composite* (out of 36)	28–32	28–32	28–32	26–31	27–32	27–32	27–32	27–32
SAT composite* (out of 1600)	1250–1400	1250–1400	1240–1400	1230–1400	1240–1400	1230–1380	1240–1400	1220–1400
* middle 50% range

=== Colleges and schools ===
College	Enrollment (2025)
College of Agriculture, Forestry and Life Sciences	2,378
College of Architecture, Art and Construction	1,178
College of Arts and Humanities	939
College of Behavioral Science and Health Science	5,051
Wilbur O. and Ann Powers College of Business	6,721
College of Education	2,139
College of Engineering, Computing and Applied Sciences	7,206
College of Science	3,530

In July 1955, the four schools that made up Clemson—Agriculture, Arts & Sciences, Engineering and Textiles—were transformed into nine colleges: Architecture, Arts and Sciences, Liberal Arts, Sciences, Commerce and Industry, Education, Engineering, Forestry and Recreation Resources, and Nursing. This structure was used by the university until 1995 when the university's nine colleges were condensed into five: Agriculture, Forestry, and Life Sciences; Architecture, Arts, and Humanities; Business and Behavioral Science; Engineering and Science; Health, Education, and Human Development. On July 14, 2014, the Eugene T. Moore School of Education broke off from the College of Health, Education, and Human development, thus becoming the sixth college.

An academic reorganization effective July 1, 2016, created seven new colleges: College of Agriculture, Forestry and Life Sciences; College of Architecture, Arts, and Humanities; College of Behavioral, Social and Health Sciences; College of Business; College of Education (including the Eugene T. Moore School of Education); College of Engineering, Computing and Applied Sciences; and College of Science.

Currently, there are nine academic colleges: College of Agriculture, Forestry and Life Sciences, College of Architecture, Art and Construction, College of Arts and Humanities, College of Behavioral, Social and Health Sciences, College of Education, College of Engineering, Computing and Applied Sciences, College of Science, the Wilbur O. and Ann Powers College of Business, and the new Harvey S. Peeler Jr. College of Veterinary Medicine.

==== College of Agriculture, Forestry, and Life Sciences ====
The College of Agriculture, Forestry, and Life Sciences (CAFLS) supports Clemson University's land-grant mission to provide education, research, and service to the public. CAFLS research is focused on the sustainability of agriculture, forests, and natural resources; food and packaging systems to ensure safe food supply, and biomedical sciences to improve human and non-human health.

==== College of Architecture, Art and Construction ====
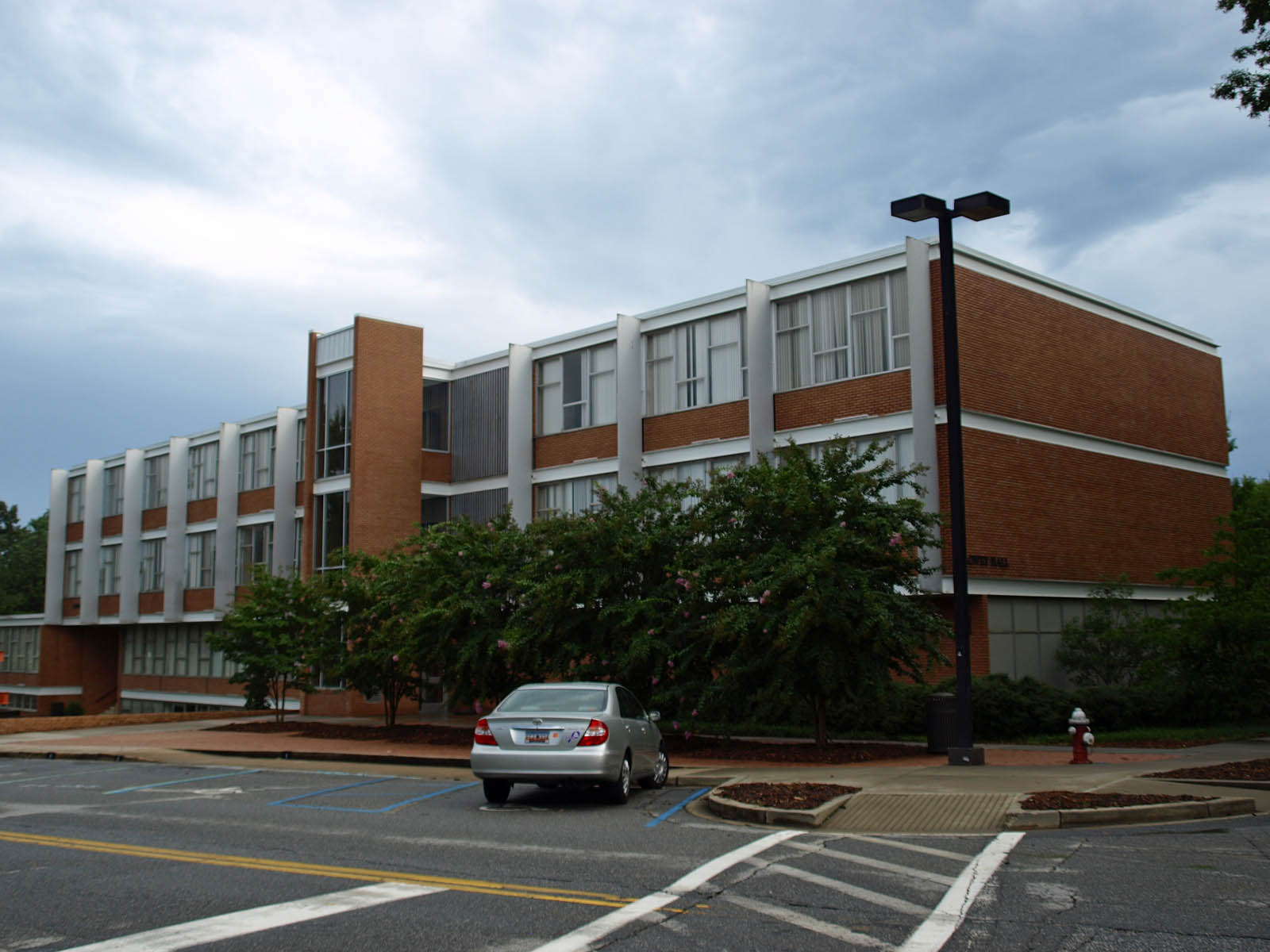
Lee and Lowry Halls are listed on the National Register of Historic Places.

The College of Architecture, Art and Construction (CAAC) contains a School of Architecture, a Department of Art and the Nieri Department of Construction, Development and Planning. Departments within the school include Construction Science and Management and Landscape Architecture. One of the departments of the college, the School of Architecture, was ranked as the No. 16 graduate school for architecture in the country by Design Intelligence. The Brooks Center serves as performing arts venue for the college.

==== College of Arts and Humanities ====
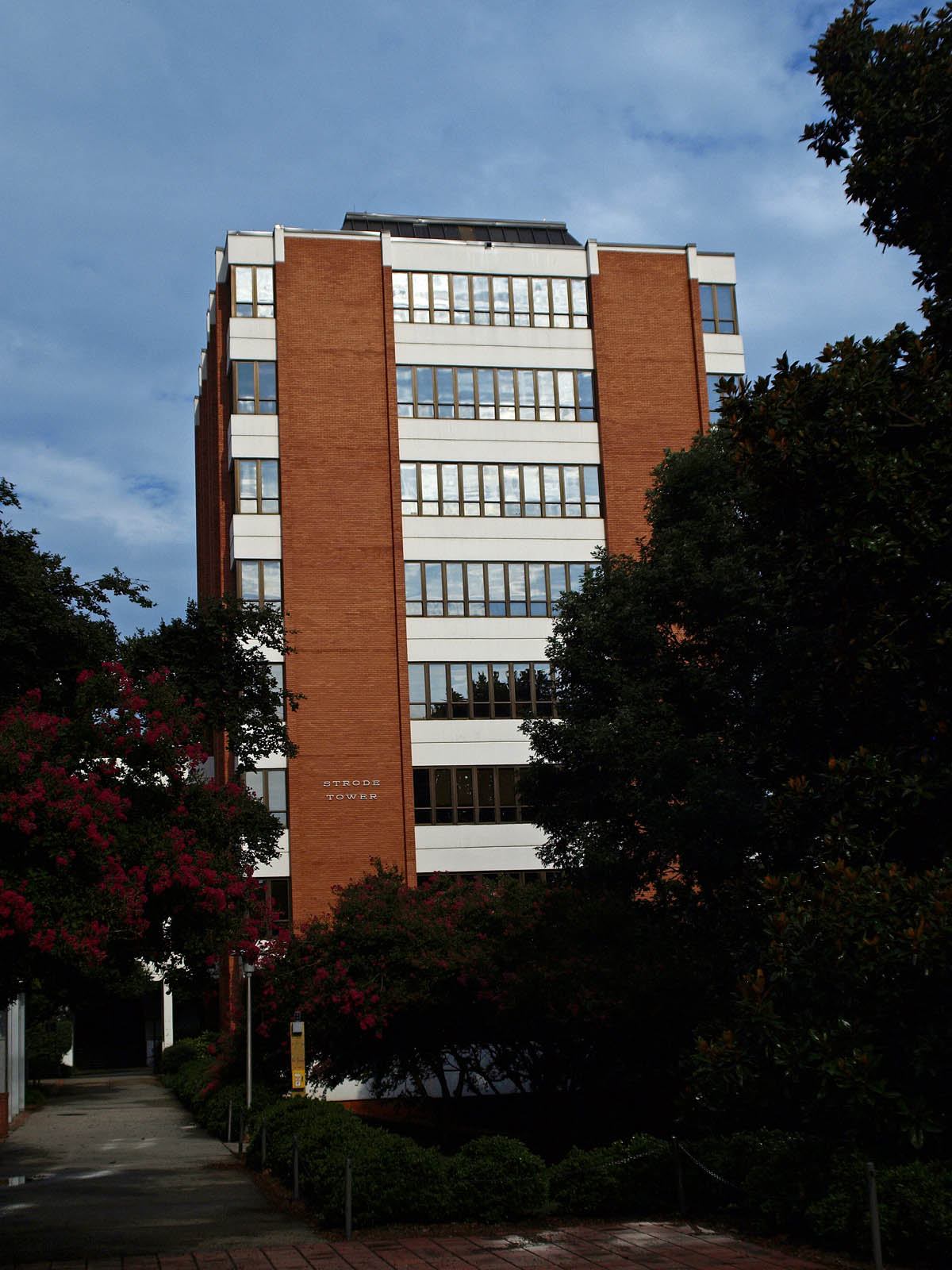
Strode Tower building

The College of Arts and Humanities (CAH) was founded in 2023 and has six departments: English, History and Geography, Interdisciplinary Studies, Languages, Performing Arts and Philosophy and Religion. Interdisciplinary Studies includes the Global Black Studies, Women’s Leadership and World Cinema programs. The Brooks Center serves as a performing arts venue for the college. The college also offers a pre-law program and promotes the Humanities Hub, which intends to advance the outreach, scholarly and teaching activities of the humanities.

==== Wilbur O. and Ann Powers College of Business ====
The Wilbur O. and Ann Powers College of Business is accredited by the Association to Advance Collegiate Schools of Business.

The College of Business, after receiving a $60m gift from Wilbur and Ann Powers, was renamed the Wilbur O. and Ann Power College of Business in October 2020. The College of Business was the first to be named in the history of Clemson University.

The Wilbur O. and Ann Powers College of Business is ranked No. 38 Best Colleges for Business in America and No. 1 Best Colleges for Business in South Carolina by Niche. The College is also named among The Princeton Review’s Best Online MBA Programs for 2026. It is ranked No. 9 for Best MBA for Human Resources, No. 31 for Top 50 Best Graduate Programs for Entrepreneurs and No. 5 for Top 50 Best Graduate Programs for Entrepreneurs (South).

As of 2025, U.S. News & World Report ranks the college No. 95 in Best Business Schools and No. 77 in Part-time MBA.

==== College of Engineering, Computing and Applied Sciences ====
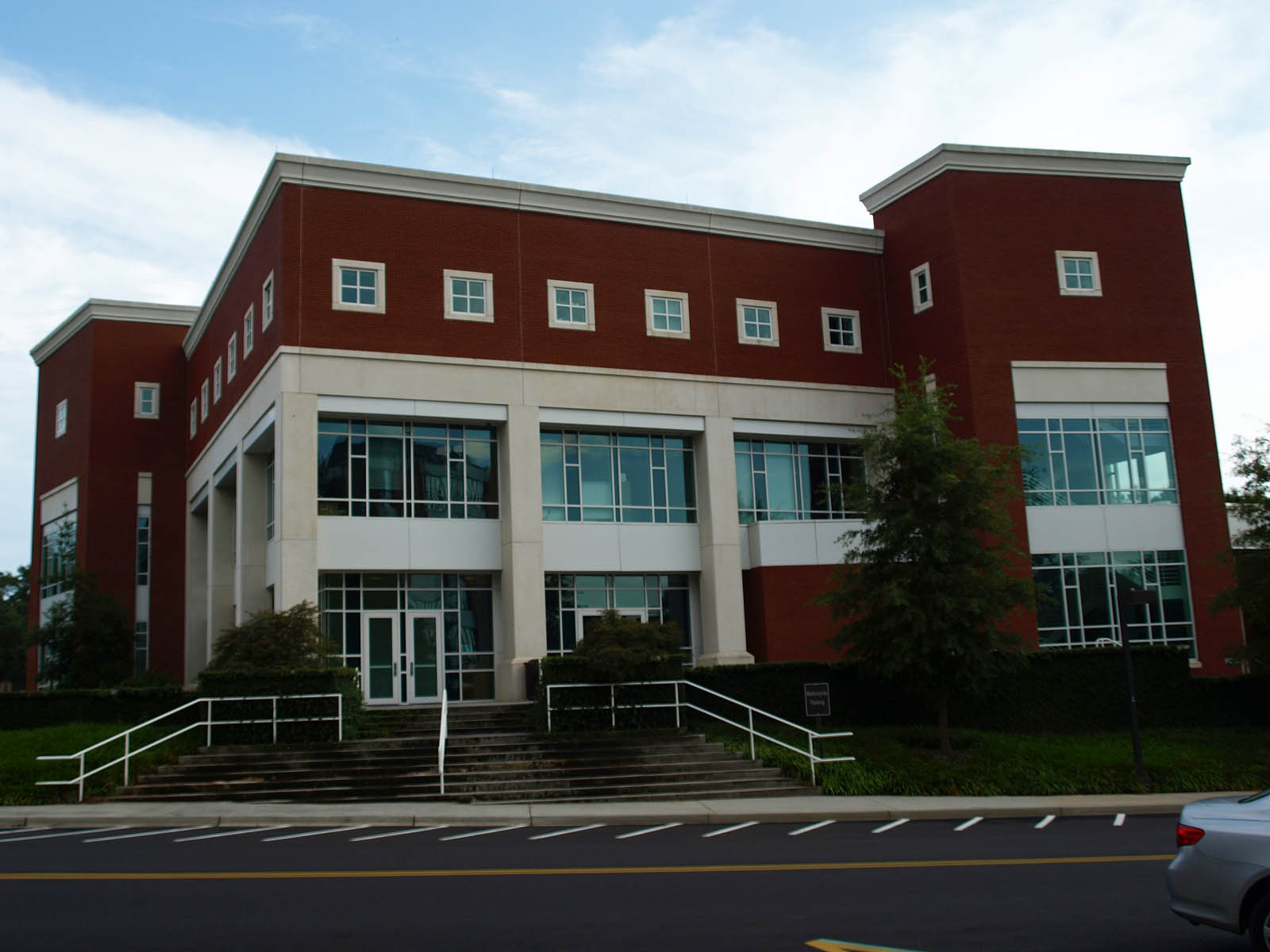
McAdams Hall

The College of Engineering, Computing, and Applied Sciences (CECAS) specializes in engineering as well as the physical sciences such as physics and chemistry. Inspired by Thomas Green Clemson's dream to create a "high seminary of learning to benefit the agricultural and mechanical arts," engineering and sciences have been an integral part of the university's development. Since the first degrees were granted in 1896, Clemson engineers and scientists have made significant contributions to South Carolina, the nation, and the world.

CECAS was formed in 1995, joining the engineering disciplines with the chemistry, computer science, geological science, mathematical science, and physics and astronomy departments.

==== Clemson University Honors College ====
The Clemson University Honors College focuses on education for highly motivated, academically talented students. Entrance to college is very competitive, with only 250 incoming freshmen accepted each year with an average SAT score of 1400 or higher and finishing in the top 3% of their high school graduating class. The college was founded in 1962 and originally named for John C. Calhoun, a South Carolina native and politician, who was the vice president of the United States from 1825 to 1832.

==== College of Education ====
The College of Education is Clemson's newest college, and is centered in Tillman Hall. The college has some 600 undergraduate students and 600 graduate students, and the mission is to embrace the diverse faculty, staff, and students and provide them with a diverse set of experiences. The COE also houses the Call Me MISTER Program and the Moore Scholars.

==== Graduate school ====
The Graduate School offers more than 100 graduate degree programs in 85 disciplines on the college's main campus and at sites such as Clemson at the Falls and the Clemson University International Center for Automotive Research in Greenville, the Clemson Architecture Center in the historic Cigar Factory in Charleston, the Restoration Institute in North Charleston, as well as some online/distance-learning programs. Many of the graduate programs are highly ranked nationally, and the school offers several unique interdisciplinary programs.

=== Rankings ===
Admission to Clemson is considered "selective" per The College Board.

For the Class of 2029 (enrolled Fall 2025), Clemson received 64,805 applications and accepted 27,498 (42.4%), with 5,084 enrolling. The middle 50% range for SAT scores for enrolling freshmen was 1250-1400, and the middle 50% ACT composite score was 28-32. For the Class of 2028 (enrolled Fall 2024), 86% of admitted students had a GPA of 4.0 or above.

Academic rankings

National
- Forbes: 86
- U.S. News & World Report: 75
- Washington Monthly: 177
- WSJ/College Pulse: 126

Global
- ARWU: 601–700
- QS: 951-1000
- THE: 801–1000
- U.S. News & World Report: 689

National program rankings
Program	Ranking
Business	95
Education	54
Engineering	64
Biological Sciences	119
Chemistry	91
Computer Science	80
Earth Sciences	119
Economics	80
Fine Arts	110
Mathematics	86
Physics	67
Psychology	124
Public Affairs	192
Statistics	61

Global program rankings
Program	Ranking
Agricultural Sciences	155
Chemistry	492
Civil Engineering	157
Computer Science	422
Engineering	423
Environment/Ecology	395
Materials Science	408
Plant and Animal Science	373
Psychiatry/Psychology	458
Public, Environmental and Occupational Health	463

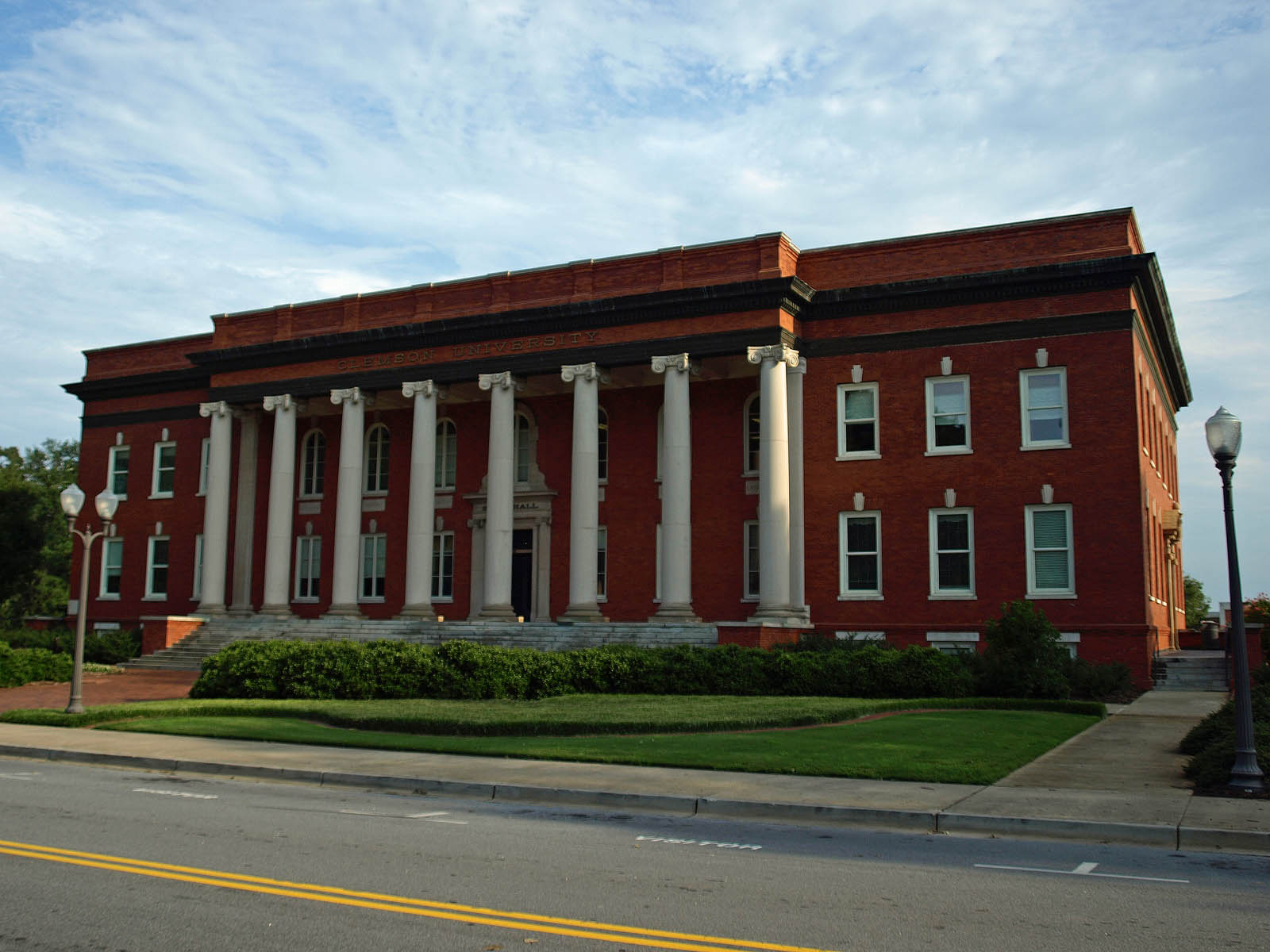
Sikes Hall is the principal administration building of Clemson.

For 2026, U.S. News & World Report ranked Clemson as 75th (tied) for best national university in the U.S. overall and No. 36 (tied) among public schools.

=== Research ===
The Clemson University International Center for Automotive Research (CU-ICAR) was established in 2013 in Greenville as a seminary for automotive research and innovation. CU-ICAR is a 250-acre (101 ha) automotive and motorsports research campus. The department of Automotive Engineering was ranked tenth in the world in 2015. CU-ICAR includes a graduate school offering master's and doctoral degrees in automotive engineering, and programs focused on systems integration. The campus also includes an Information Technology Research Center being developed by BMW. BMW, Microsoft, IBM, Bosch, Timken, JTEKT/Koyo and Michelin are all major corporate partners of CU-ICAR. Private-sector companies that have committed to establishing offices and/or facilities on the campus include the Society of Automotive Engineers and Timken. Plans for the campus also include a full-scale, four-vehicle capacity rolling road wind tunnel.

The Charleston Innovation Campus in North Charleston was founded in 2004 as the Restoration Institute. It houses the Warren Lasch Conservation Center, Dominion Energy Innovation Center, and the Zucker Family Graduate Education Center. The conservation center includes the Hunley Commission, which is undertaking the stabilization of the H. L. Hunley, a Civil War submarine that was the world's first to sink a ship. The energy innovation center opened in 2013 and houses a 7.5MW and a 15MW offshore wind turbine test facility for $100 million. In 2016, Clemson opened the Zucker Family Graduate Education Center. The 70,000 sq. ft. facility is home to graduate programs in digital arts and engineering disciplines.

In 2016, Clemson announced a new partnership with Siemens, including a grant with a total value of $357,224,294. This grant is the largest in the school's history. Through it, students in Clemson's College of Engineering, Computing, and Applied Sciences will have access to a variety of new software.

== Student life ==
Undergraduate demographics as of Fall 2025
Race and ethnicity	Total
White	75%
Hispanic	9%
Black	5%
Two or more races	4%
Asian	3%
Unknown	3%
International student	1%
Economic diversity
Low-income (Note: The percentage of students who received an income-based federal Pell grant intended for low-income students.)	15%
Affluent (Note: The percentage of students who are a part of the American middle class at the bare minimum.)	85%

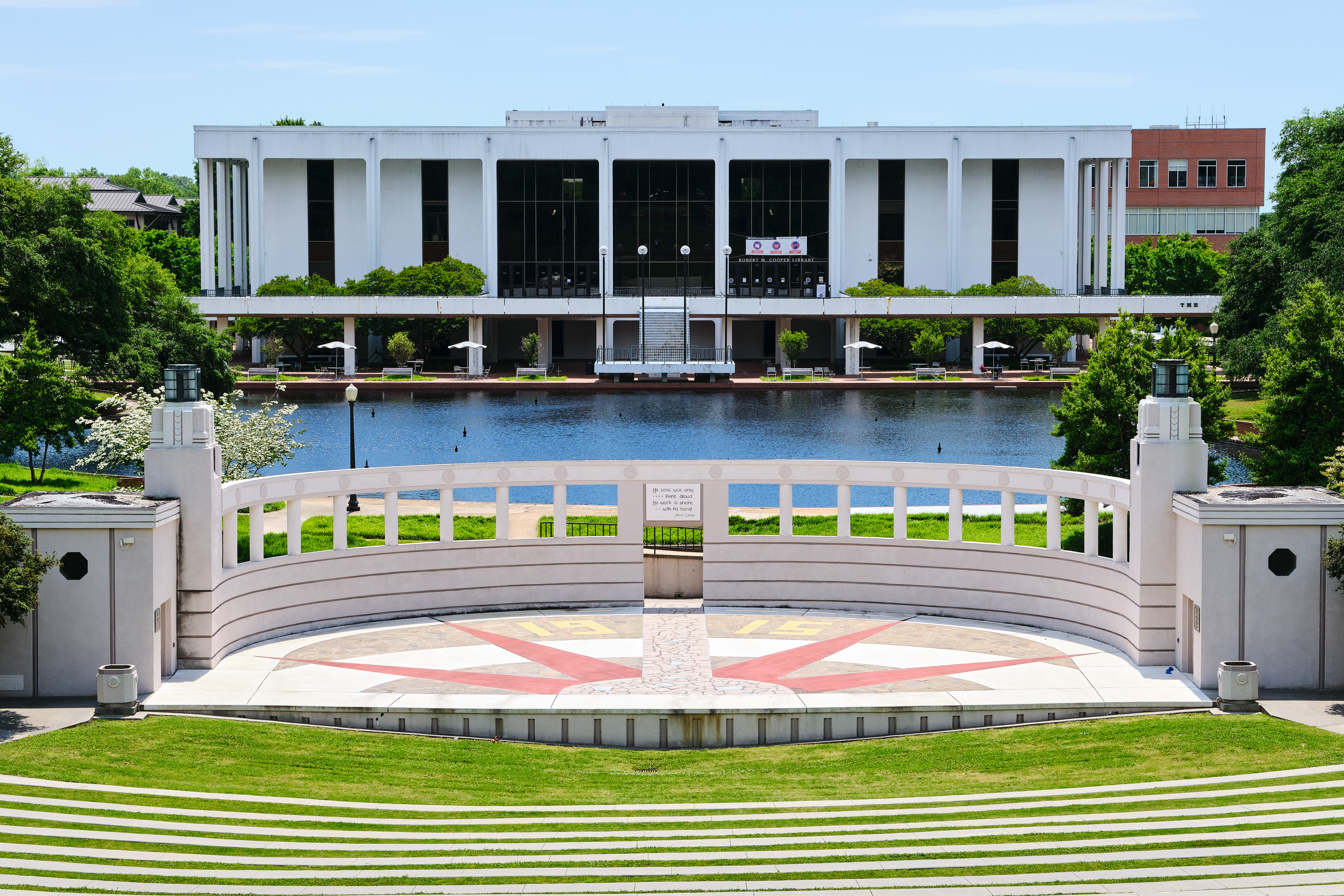
Clemson University Outdoor Theater and Cooper Library

=== Intramurals ===
In addition to its varsity programs, Clemson offers a wide variety of intramural sports:

- Basketball
- Billiards
- Bowling
- Cornhole
- Dodgeball
- Flag football
- Indoor soccer
- Kickball
- Racquetball
- Soccer
- Softball
- Spikeball
- Tennis
- Ultimate frisbee
- Volleyball
- Wiffleball

=== Fraternity and sorority life ===
The university's fraternities and sororities system is somewhat different from other large universities in the southern U.S. in that there are no Greek houses on campus, although there are residence halls designated for fraternities and sororities. There are a few fraternity houses off campus. The remaining sororities' on-campus housing is on the other end of campus, in what is commonly referred to as "the horseshoe" in Smith and Barnett Halls.

In 2023, 18% of men and 37% of women were involved in Greek Life, out of 23,340 undergraduate students. In Spring 2024, 87% of all Greek Life members exceeded a 3.0 GPA. While the required GPA to join Greek life is 2.7, the mean GPA of each sorority was above the all-university mean.

=== Military heritage ===
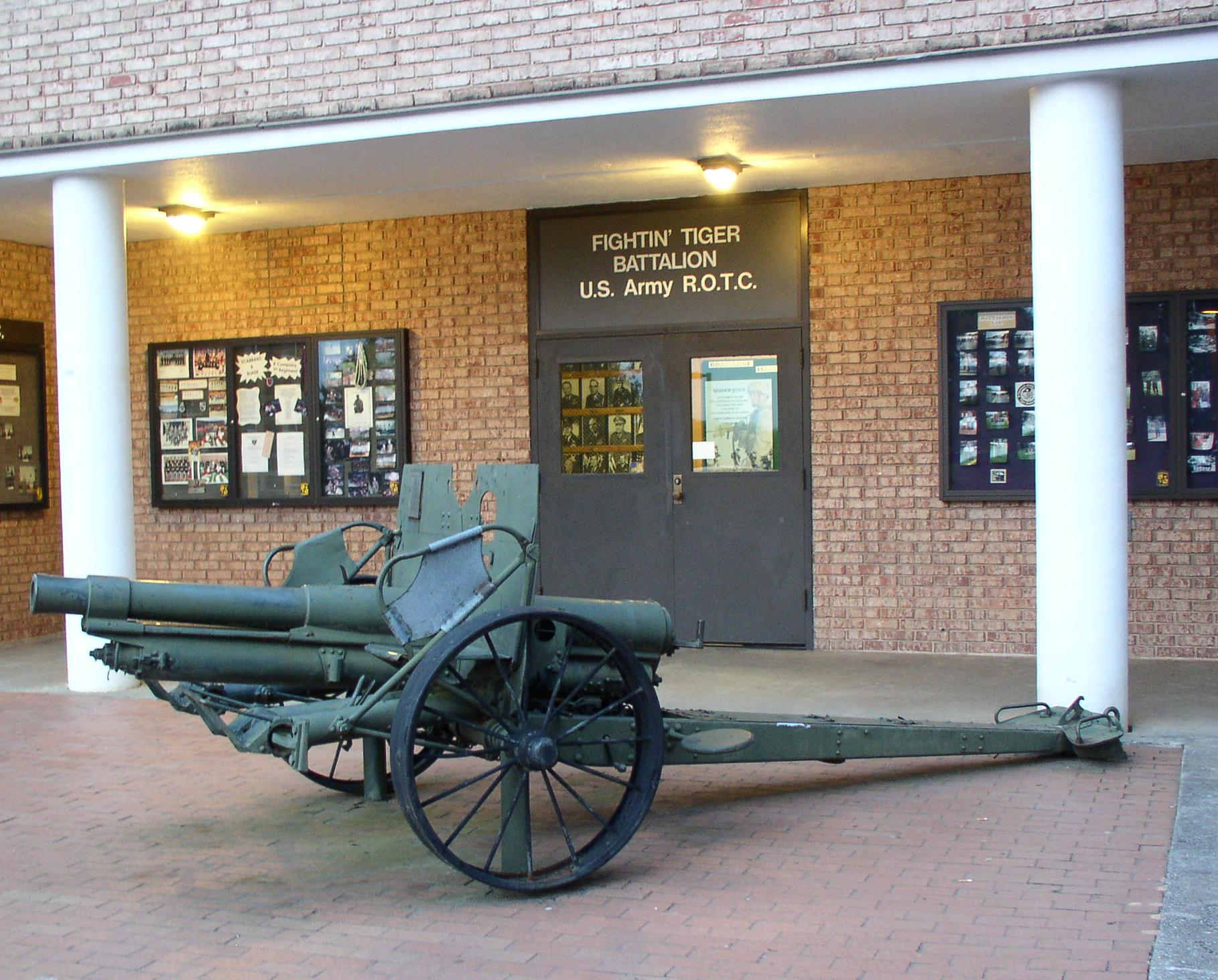
Clemson's U.S. Army ROTC Battalion headquarters, found in Johnstone Hall

The university is home to detachments for U.S. Army and U.S. Air Force Reserve Officers' Training Corps (ROTC) as well as a host school for the U.S. Marine Corps PLC program adjacent to the Semper Fi Society.

In addition to students from the university, these organizations also serve students from Anderson University, Southern Wesleyan University, Bob Jones University, and Tri-County Technical College. The university's AAS squadron was selected to be home of Arnold Air Society's National Headquarters for the 2005–2006 year and again for the 2006–2007 year. The C-4 Pershing Rifles have won the national society's drill meet nine times: 1999, 2003, 2004, 2005, 2006, 2008, 2009, 2011, and 2017.

=== Student media ===
Clemson University has five student-operated media outlets within its communication department. Each have been guided by faculty advisor and director of student media Wanda Johnson since 2019 when the outlets reintegrated as a component of the university. The five outlets are The Tiger, Tigervision, The Pendulum, The Chronicle, and WSBF-FM.

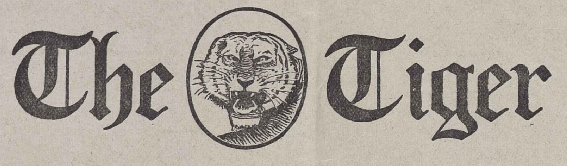
Logo from The Tiger Vol. XII No. 25 on May 2, 1917

Founded in 1907, The Tiger is the oldest student-run newspaper in South Carolina. The Tiger is printed biweekly, on Thursdays, and maintains a staff of over 30 senior members and contributing staff.

Tigervision, Clemson's student-run TV station, broadcasts on channel 88 on the university's campus cable network. The station was created in 1994 under the name Clemson Cable Network by students at WSBF-FM. In 2007, CCN was reorganized into Clemson Television and began to produce student comedy shows and air public domain films. In 2014, CTV was renamed Tigervision to coincide with its switch to high-definition broadcasting.

The Pendulum is a student-run international affairs magazine. It was established in 2014. It publishes twice a year.

The Chronicle is a literary art magazine that publishes biannually. It was founded in 1897.

WSBF-FM was founded in 1958 and made its first broadcast on April 1, 1960. In the beginning, WSBF's content was mostly agriculture education shows and classical music. By the mid-1960s, the station began to air sports programs such as The Frank Howard Show along with the news. The station would eventually shift to a "progressive" format where it focused on new, up-and-coming contemporary music groups. During the 1980s, the format would shift gradually to the station's current "alternative" format. WSBF plays a variety of genres, including jazz, rap, punk, rock, and folk, focusing on independent artists. The station broadcasts to the Clemson area and upstate South Carolina on 88.1 FM and online.

TAPS Yearbook was established in 1907 after members of the Clemson College Chronicle, the literary arts magazine at the time, wanted to publish a new book printed annually. It is named after the bugle call "Taps," which was played each night when cadets went to bed during the college's time as a military school. Each edition of TAPS contains student portraits, information on student organizations, and reviews of the past year's events. The end of the 2017–18 academic year was the final edition of the yearbook.

== Traditions ==
=== Tiger Paw ===
The Tiger Paw became the official logo for Clemson University in 1970, in place of the previous tiger logo. The paw is now used on all athletic teams and collegiate documents. The tiger paw is also painted on surfaces throughout campus and on highways leading to the campus.

=== Homecoming and Tigerama ===
Every year, Clemson students have the opportunity to attend Homecoming and Tigerama. The Clemson Homecoming tradition began in 1914 and has been held annually at Clemson University ever since. During homecoming week, various student organizations design and build homecoming floats on Bowman Field. The floats are then revealed on the Saturday of the football game and judged by a select panel. Since 1957, Clemson has held "Tigerama" on the Friday night of homecoming week. Tigerama is one of the nation's largest student-run pep rallies, averaging about 40,000 people. This Clemson event includes the crowning of Miss Homecoming, skits by various academic organizations, and a fireworks show.

=== First Friday Parade ===
The First Friday Parade has been held on the Friday before the first home football game every year since 1974. The parade includes fraternities, sororities, the Clemson marching band, the university president, and many other student organizations. A pep rally is held in the university's amphitheater. In 1985, the parade had its highest attendance when accompanying CBS commentators were the Grand Marshals.

=== Alma mater ===
The Clemson University alma mater originated in the 1910s after a group of Clemson ROTC cadets in May 1918 was asked to sing the school's song at a gathering of ROTC cadets in Plattsburgh, New York; they were unable to do so, as Clemson had no song at the time. One of the cadets in attendance, A.C. Corcoran of Charleston, South Carolina, decided to remedy the situation and wrote the words to the alma mater and set them to "Annie Lisle", which was the melody of Cornell University's alma mater, as well as many others. The words were later officially accepted by the then-named Clemson Agricultural College as the alma mater and were first performed by the Clemson Glee Club on February 17, 1919.

In 1947, the club "Tiger Brotherhood" decided that rather than continue borrowing another school's melody, the university should compose its own. As a result, the Tiger Brotherhood sponsored a contest to have Clemson students compose a unique melody. On May 5, 1947, Clemson University's school newspaper The Tiger announced Robert E. Farmer of Anderson, South Carolina, a member of the glee club at the time, as the winner. Farmer's melody was slightly altered in 1970, but was restored to its original tune in 2009.

=== Fight song ===
The university's fight song is the jazz standard the "Tiger Rag".

== Athletics ==
Clemson University teams are known as the Tigers. They compete as a member of the National Collegiate Athletic Association (NCAA) Division I level (Football Bowl Subdivision (FBS) sub-level for football), primarily competing in the Atlantic Coast Conference (ACC) for all sports since the 1953–54 season. Men's sports include baseball, basketball, cross country, football, golf, soccer, tennis, and track & field, while women's sports include basketball, cross country, golf, gymnastics, lacrosse, rowing, soccer, tennis, track & field, softball, and volleyball.

The most-prominent athletics facilities on campus are Memorial Stadium, Littlejohn Coliseum, Doug Kingsmore Stadium, Historic Riggs Field, and Fike Recreation Center.

In 2020, university officials decided to dissolve its men's track and field and cross country teams at the end of the academic year. Despite pressure from student activists, the university did not reverse its decision until a class-action Title IX lawsuit was formed. Following pressure from state officials, the university reversed its decision on April 22, 2021. The university followed this by announcing the additions of women's lacrosse and gymnastics.

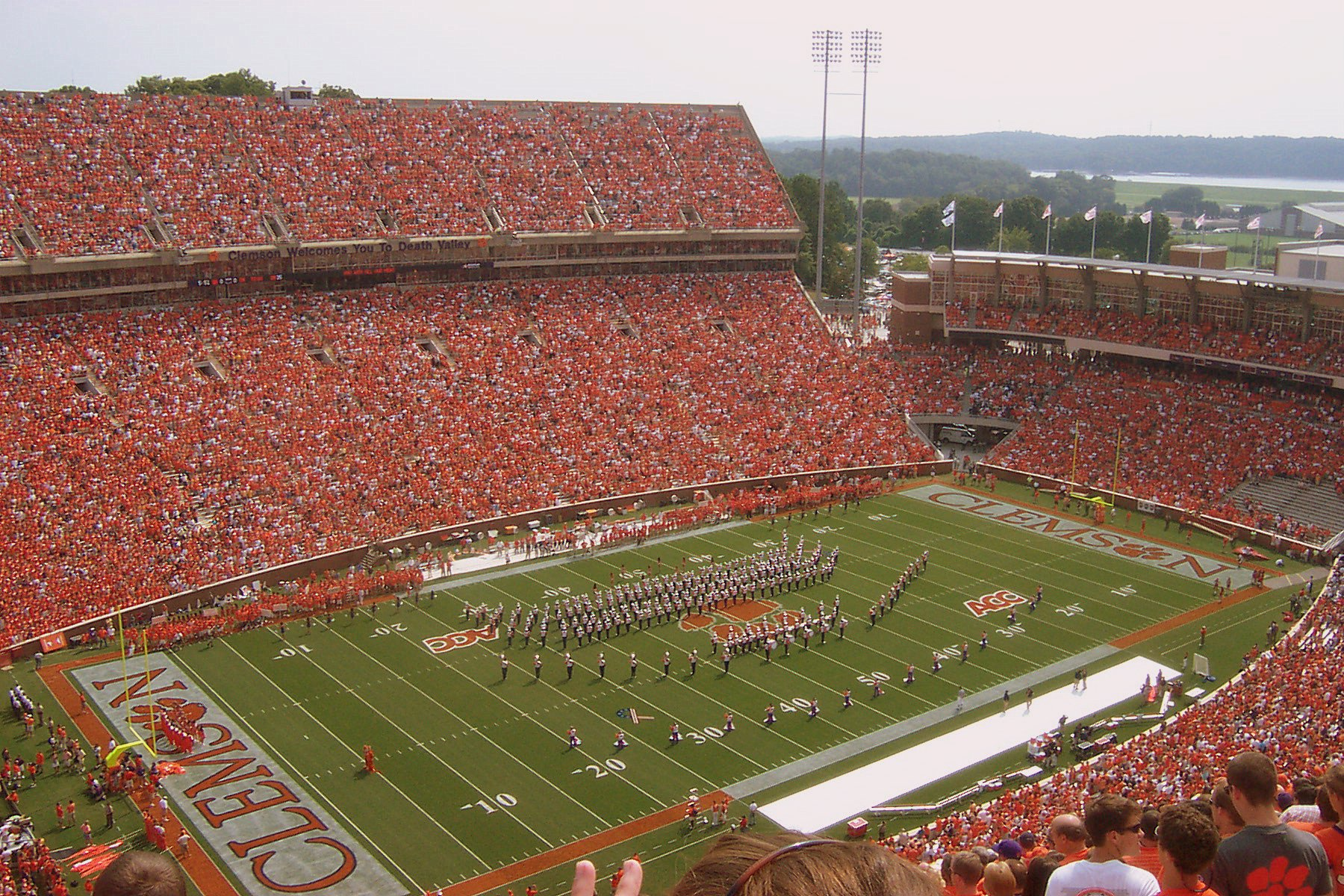
Memorial Stadium

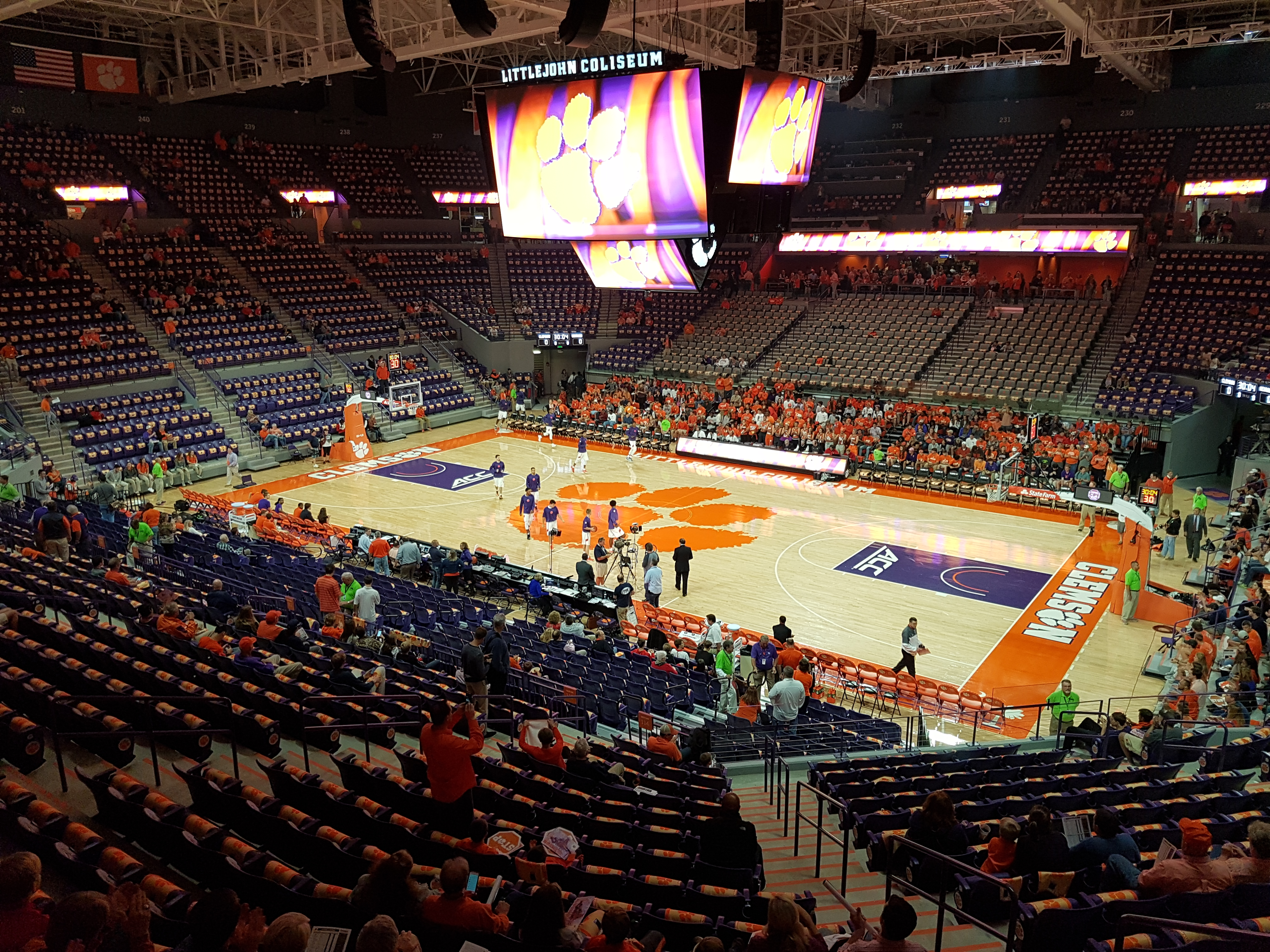
Littlejohn Coliseum

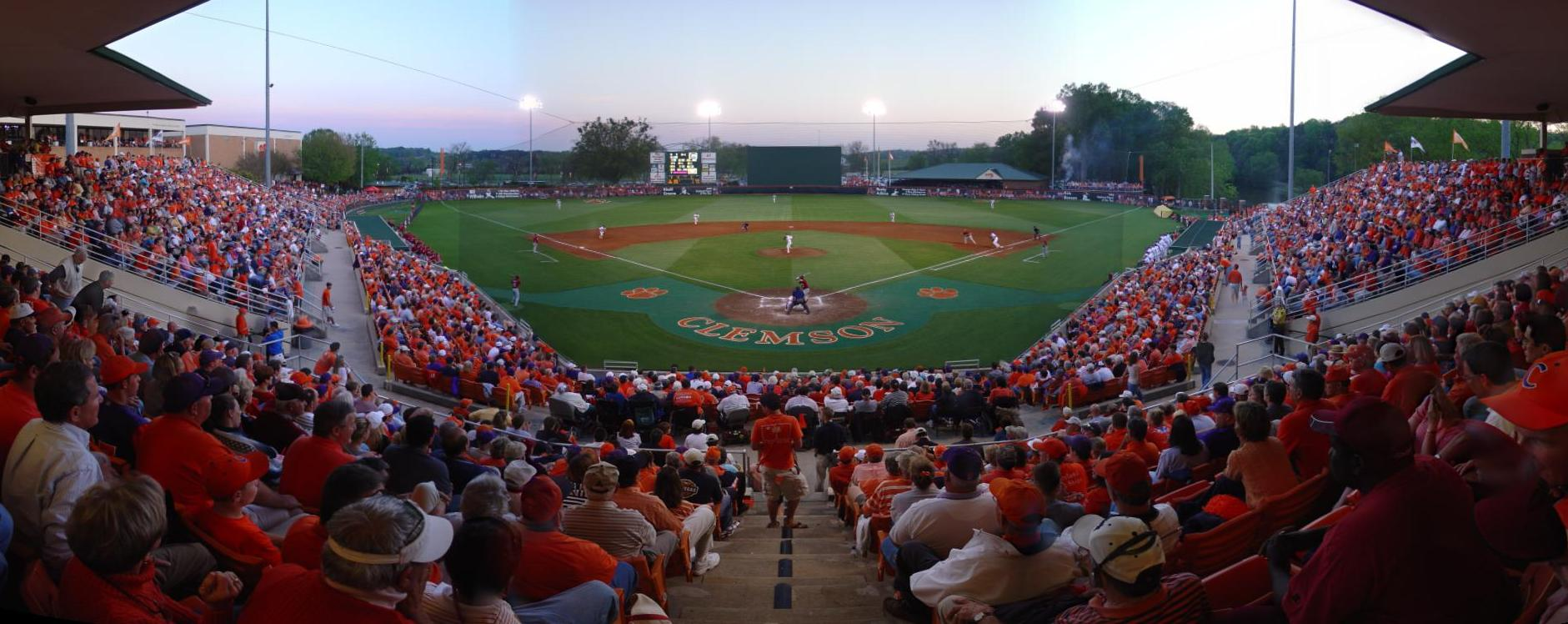
Doug Kingsmore Stadium

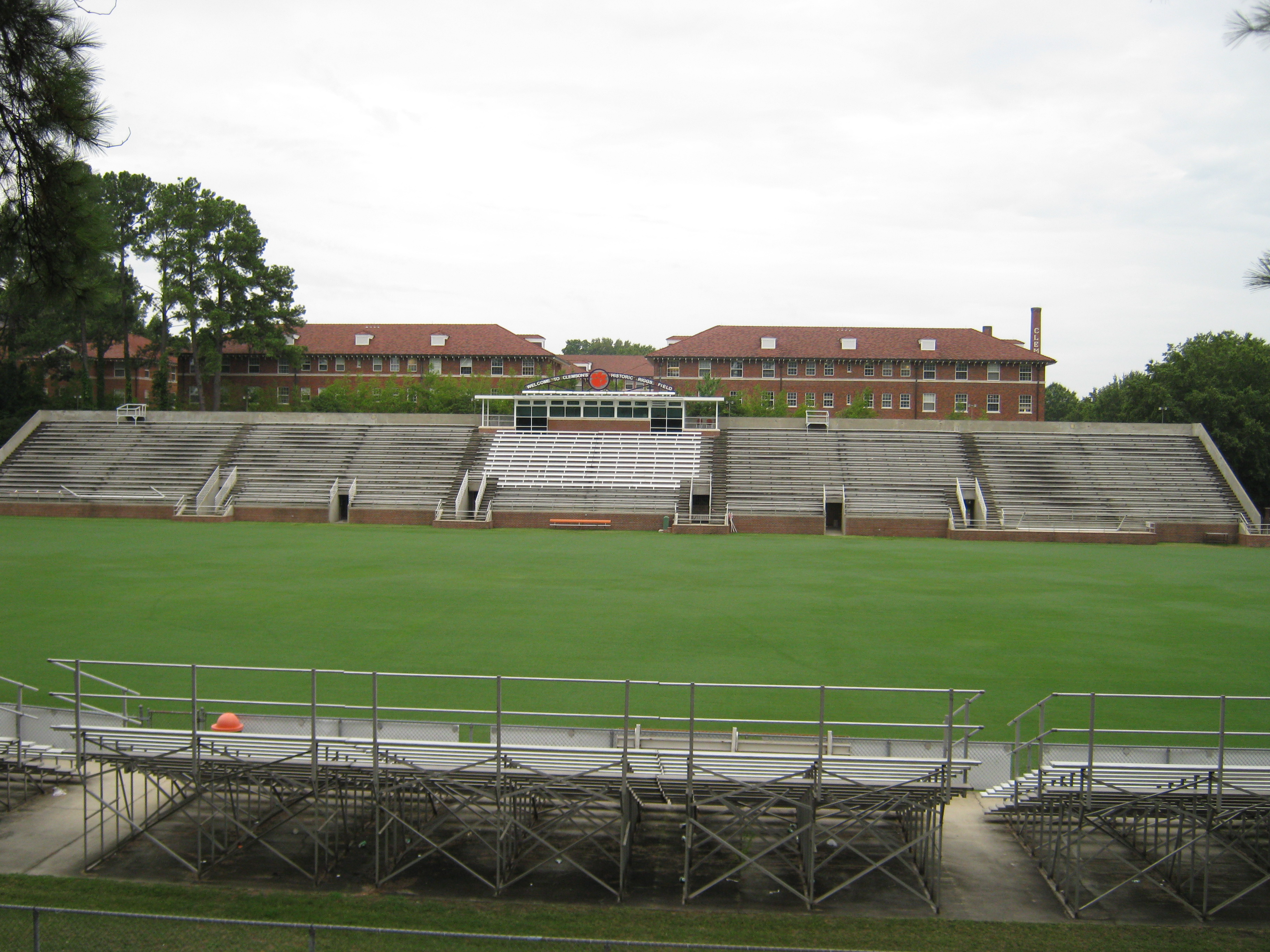
Riggs Field

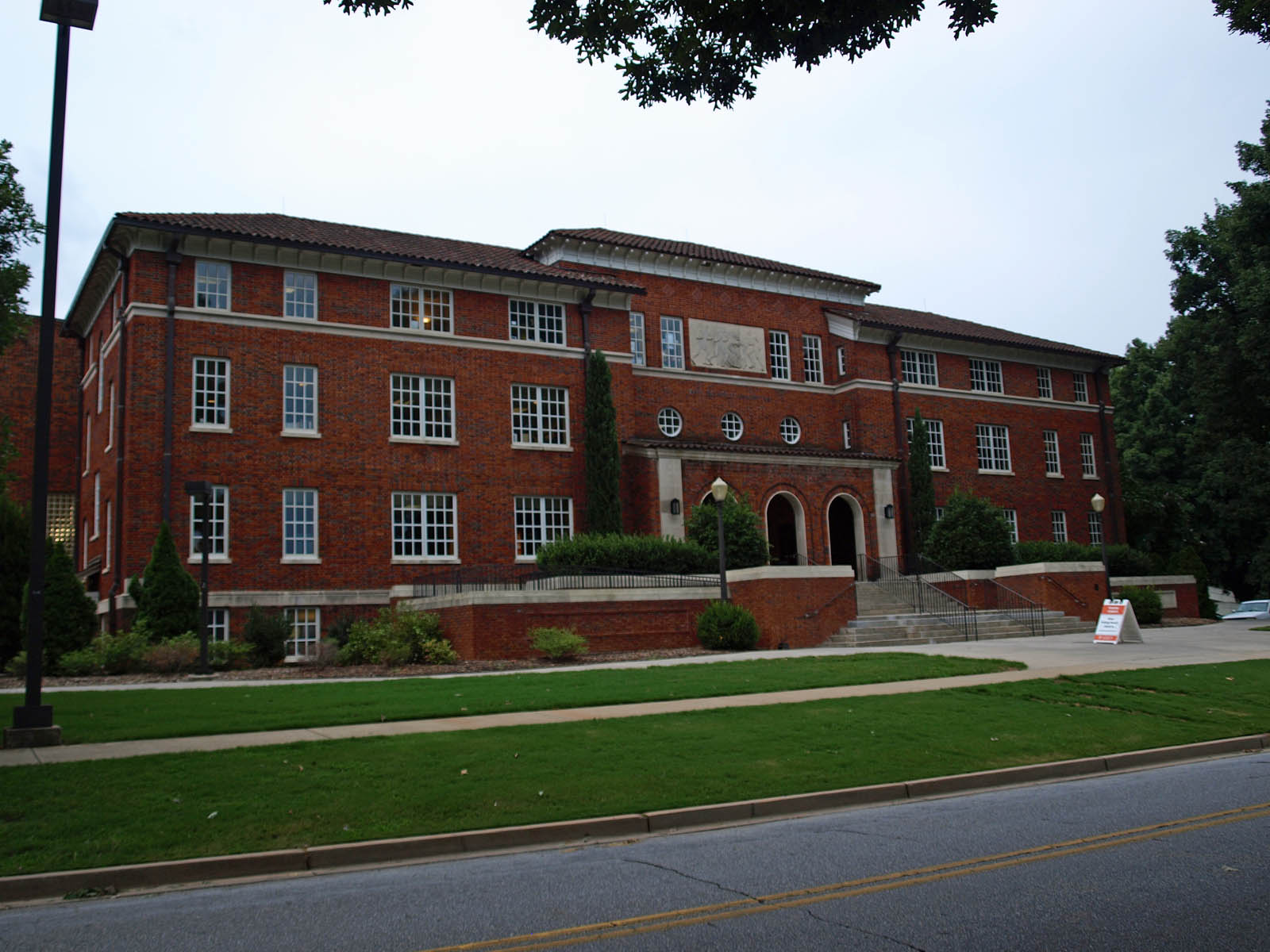
Fike Recreation Center

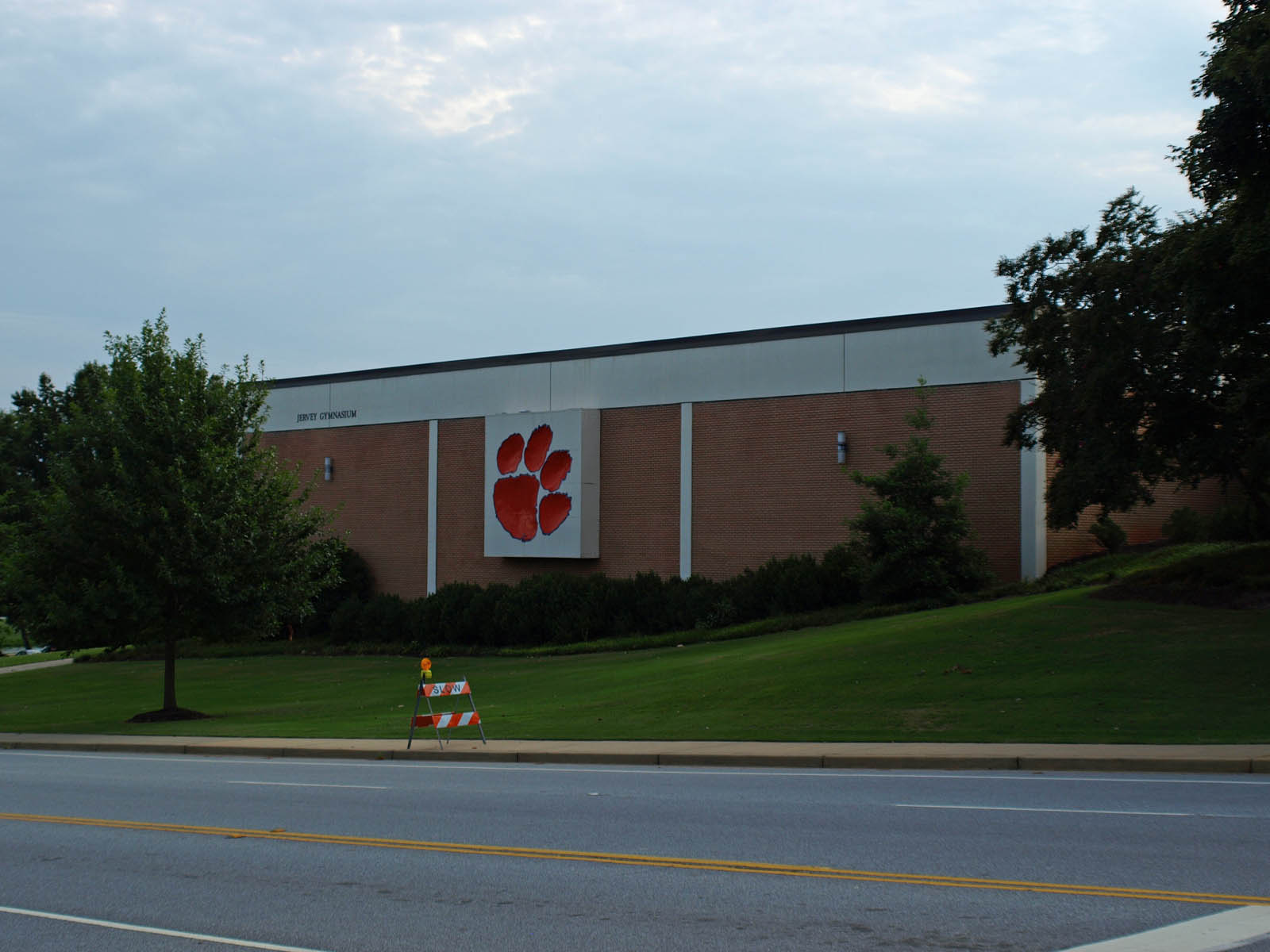
Jervey Athletic Center

== Public safety and governance ==
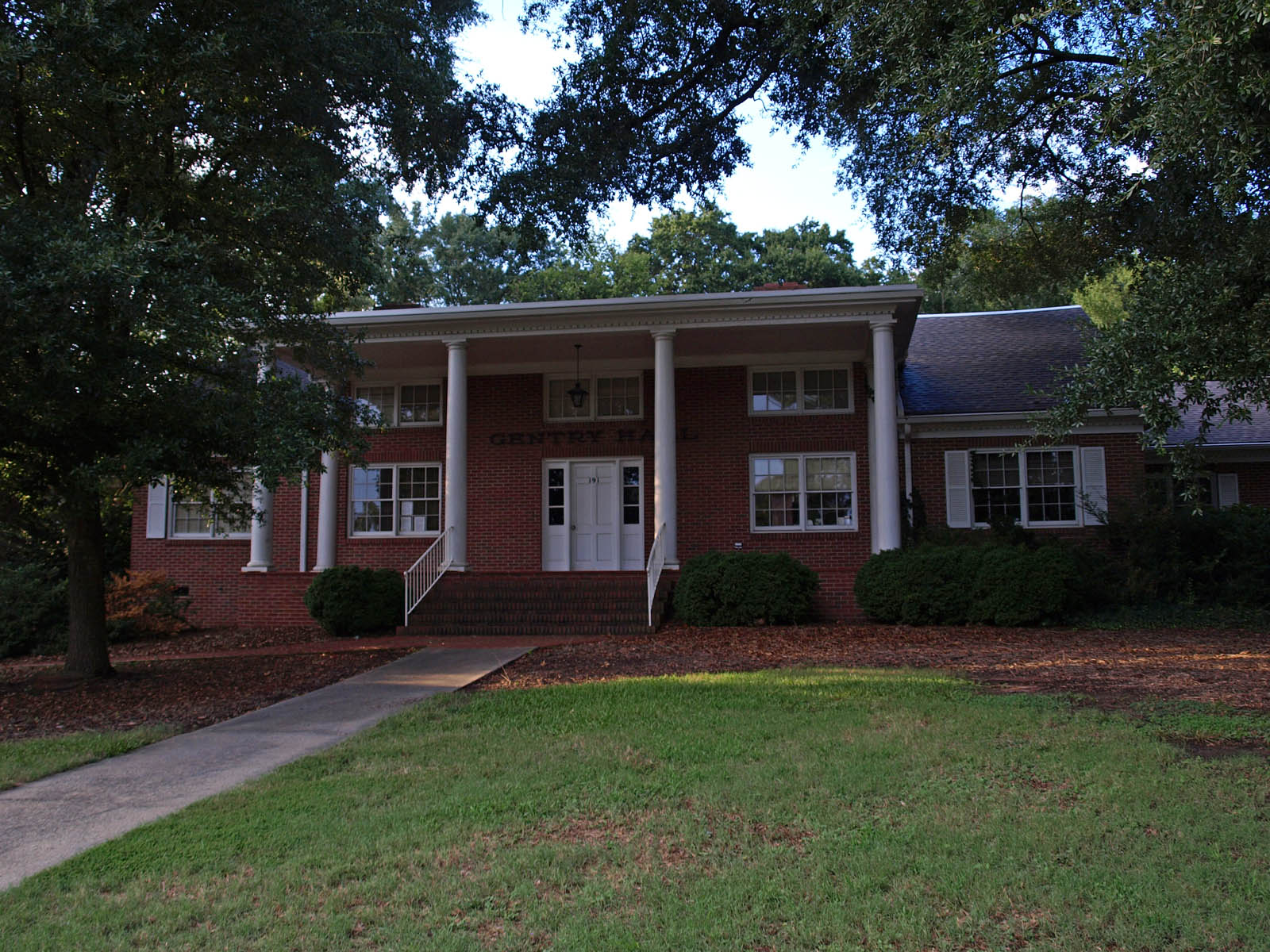
Gentry Hall houses Clemson University's municipal court.

Clemson University operates with the Clemson University Police Department and the Clemson University Fire & EMS for public safety needs. Both departments are staffed 24 hours a day, seven days a week. The Clemson University Fire & EMS has two stations: the headquarters at 1521 Perimeter Road, and a second station at 740 Issaqueena Trail. The Police Department is located at 124 Ravenel Center Place, Seneca.

Clemson University Fire Department provides fire protection to the City of Clemson.

The governing body of the municipal corporation of Clemson University is the university's board of trustees. Clemson University has its own municipal court, which is housed in Gentry Hall. The judge of that court is appointed by the board of trustees, and the Clemson student affairs division manages the court. The university may not put in place its own taxes, and purchasing of food and beverage does not come with additional taxes that the City of Clemson levies in its jurisdiction. Additionally, Clemson University has its own policies on the open carrying of alcohol while the municipal code of the City of Clemson explicitly forbids open carrying of alcohol.

== Notable faculty ==
- John Ballato, professor of materials science and engineering, electrical and computer engineering
- Donald D. Clayton, professor of Physics & Astronomy
- Murray S. Daw, professor of Physics
- Thomas Hazlett, professor of Economics
- Randolph W. House, US Army lieutenant general, assistant professor of military science
- John W. Huffman, professor of Chemistry
- Jo Jorgensen, Libertarian political activist and the Libertarian Party's presidential nominee in the 2020 election
- Donald Liebenberg, professor of Physics and Astronomy
- Trudy Mackay, professor of Genetics and Biochemistry
- Michael J. Padilla, former Director of the Eugene T. Moore School of Education
- June Pilcher, professor of Psychology
- Ramakrishna Podila, professor of Physics
- Apparao M. Rao, professor of Physics
- David Reinking, professor of Education
- Aleda Roth, professor of Operations Management
- C. Bradley Thompson, professor of Political Science
- Robert Tollison, professor of Economics
- Antony Valentini, professor of Physics and Astronomy
- Nicholas Vazsonyi, dean of the College of Architecture, Arts and Humanities
- Victor J. Vitanza, professor of Rhetoric
- Bruce Yandle, professor of Economics

== Explanatory notes ==
^note a: The local pronunciation of Clemson is [klɛmpsən]. Because of the pin–pen merger in Southern American English, [ɪ] can be substituted for [ɛ] as the first vowel, as [klɪmpsən]. Those not familiar with the local pronunciation often say [klɛmzən] or [klɛmsən], as the spelling would suggest. See generally The Routledge Handbook of Contemporary English Pronunciation.
