= Murray S. Daw =

American physicist

Murray S. Daw is an American physicist and Clemson University professor. He is best known for his work on the embedded atom model.

== Early life and education ==
Daw graduated from the University of Florida in 1976 with a Bachelor of Science degree in physics. He undertook doctoral study in the subject at the California Institute of Technology, guided by advisers Darryl Smith and Tom McGill. Upon completing his Ph.D. in theoretical physics in 1981, Daw worked at the Sandia National Laboratories until 1994, when he began teaching at Clemson.

== Academic Career and Honors ==
At Clemson, Daw was appointed R. A. Bowen Professor of Physics in 2003, and Dean's Distinguished Professor of Physics in 2021. Daw was affiliated with Motorola between 1998 and 2000. He was elected a fellow the American Physical Society in 2000, while working at Motorola, "[f]or his original contributions to the atomic scale modeling of the properties of solids, surface, interfaces and defects." The American Academy of Arts and Sciences granted Daw an equivalent honor in 2004.
