= John Ballato =

American materials scientist, entrepreneur, and academic

- Born: January 9, 1971 (age 55); New York City
- Occupations: Materials scientist, entrepreneur, and academic
- Awards: Fellow, American Association for the Advancement of Science (AAAS); Fellow, Institute of Electrical and Electronics Engineers (IEEE); Fellow, American Physical Society (APS); Fellow, Optica (formerly the Optical Society of America, OSA); William Streifer Scientific Achievement Award, IEEE Photonics Society; George W. Morey Award, American Ceramic Society; Academician, World Academy of Ceramics (WAC)

Academic background
- Education: B.S. Ceramic Science and Engineering; PhD Ceramic and Materials Engineering
- Alma mater: Rutgers University

John Ballato is an American materials scientist, entrepreneur, and academic. He holds the J. E. Sirrine Endowed Chair of Optical Fiber and is a professor of materials science and engineering, electrical and computer engineering, as well as physics and astronomy at Clemson University. He has received many international recognitions for his research on optical and optoelectronic materials, particularly as relates to optical fiber.

Ballato is a Fellow of the American Ceramic Society (ACerS), Optica (formerly the Optical Society of America, OSA), the International Society for Optical Engineering (SPIE), the Institute of Electrical and Electronics Engineers (IEEE), the American Association for the Advancement of Science (AAAS), and the American Physical Society (APS). He is also a member of World Academy of Science, the US National Academy of Inventors, and Aspen Global Leadership Network (AGLN), and serves as editor of the journal Optical Materials. He is an active participant on the "Photonic Glasses and Optical Fibers" technical committee for the International Commission on Glass.

== Education ==
Ballato studied at Rutgers University, and received his bachelor's degree in ceramic science and engineering in 1993, and a PhD in ceramic and materials engineering in 1997. His undergraduate research and thesis was conducted under the guidance Elias Snitzer. His doctoral dissertation, Sol-Gel Synthesis of Rare Earth Doped Halide Optical Materials for Photonic Applications, was supervised by Richard Riman.

== Career ==
Ballato began his career as an assistant professor of ceramic and materials engineering at Clemson University in 1997. He was promoted to associate professor in 2002 and became a professor of materials science and engineering in 2007. Along with the latter appointment, he has held secondary appointments as professor of electrical and computer engineering since 2009, and as professor of physics and astronomy since 2021.

Ballato held several administrative appointments throughout his career. He served as Director of the Center for Optical Materials Science and Engineering Technologies at Clemson University from 2000 until 2014. During this time period, he also held concurrent appointments as Faculty Representative to the (Clemson University) Board of Trustees, and as vice president for Research and Economic Development. Prior to becoming J. E. Sirrine Endowed Chair of Optical Fiber in 2015, he served as vice president for economic development. In 2019, he was elected as Director of the AVX Corporation, a position he served in until their acquisition by Kyocera.

Ballato is the co-founder of South Mechanic Street Group, and AEOS Fiber Optics. In 2001, he co-founded Tetramer Technologies.

== Research ==
Ballato has published more than 600 scientific papers. He has focused his research on the use of optical materials and structures for the purpose of gaining high-value photonic and optoelectronic applications. His research group develops specialty optical fibers for high energy laser, biomedical, and industrial uses. He has 35 issued patents.

While studying at Rutgers University, Ballato and his mentor, Elias Snitzer, invented a new process for manufacturing optical fibers, the "Molten Core Method." Later, in 2013, Ballato reconsidered the materials that can be used to make commercially relevant optical fibers with properties not otherwise possible using conventional fabrication approaches. He put a particular emphasis on the expansion of the molten core approach to a wide variety of novel yet practical fibers. He has shown the molten core process to be amenable to the fabrication of both glassy and crystalline fibers. Relating to the glassy fibers, he developed a range of crystal-derived all-glass fibers that exhibited very low optical nonlinearities. Relating to the crystalline core fibers, Ballato was the first to use the molten core method to fabricate long lengths of glass-clad semiconductor fibers, opening the door to their greater availability and application. It is for this body of work that many of his awards relate.

Ballato's study and development of optical fibers also extends into infrared glasses and fibers. Moreover, his research paved the way to device-level implementation of two novel light-guiding approaches, transverse Anderson localization and gain-guiding in an index-antiguiding fiber, with potential applications in lasers and imaging.

In addition to his body of work in optical fiber, Ballato also has studied and made contributions to long-term ordering in semiconductors, nanograin-sized transparent ceramics, numerous passive and active optical polymers, and ferroelectric ceramics.

== Awards and honors ==
- 1997 – Norbert J. Kreidl Award, The Glass and Optical Materials Division (GOMD) of the American Ceramic Society (ACerS)
- 2003 – Robert Lansing Hardy Award, The Minerals, Metals & Materials Society (TMS), "in recognition of exceptional promise for a successful career in metallurgy or materials science."
- 2004 – The Schwartzwalder-PACE Award, National Institute of Ceramic Engineers, "in recognition of the nation’s outstanding young ceramic engineer whose achievements have been significant to the profession and the general welfare of the American people."
- 2004 – Robert L. Coble Award, American Ceramic Society (ACerS), "in recognition of the nation’s outstanding young ceramic scientist."
- 2007 – Liberty Fellow; An incubator for exemplary leadership in South Carolina
- 2009 – Fellow, American Ceramic Society (ACerS)
- 2010 – Richard M. Fulrath Award, American Ceramic Society; recognizes "excellence in research and development of ceramic sciences and materials"
- 2011 – Fellow, International Society of Optical Engineering (SPIE), for "achievements in novel optical materials and optical fibers."
- 2012 – Fellow, Optical Society of America (OSA)
- 2014 – Class of ’39 Award for Excellence, Clemson University
- 2014 – South Carolina Governor's Award for Excellence in Scientific Research
- 2014 – Arthur L. Friedberg Ceramics Engineering Award, American Ceramic Society and National Institute of Ceramic Engineering
- 2014 – Top Ten Breakthroughs, Physics World magazine (Institute of Physics), recognition of first realization of transverse Anderson localization in a glass optical fiber
- 2015 – Academician, World Academy of Ceramics (WAC), for "pioneering advances in optical fibers, glasses, and ceramics. Distinguished leadership and service to the field of glasses and optical materials."
- 2015 – Fellow, US National Academy of Inventors (NAI)
- 2017 – Fellow, Institute of Electrical and Electronics Engineers (IEEE), for "contributions to optical fibers and optoelectronic materials."
- 2019 – Fellow, American Association for the Advancement of Science (AAAS), for "distinguished contributions to the field of optical fiber and optoelectronic materials; most notably the development of semiconductor and crystal-derived optical fibers."
- 2020 – Fellow, American Physical Society (APS), for "pioneering contributions to optical fibers, most notably to novel fiber optic materials and their fabrication."
- 2022 – William Streifer Scientific Achievement Award, IEEE Photonics Society, for "pioneering contributions to the science, engineering, and application of optoelectronic fibers."
- 2022 – George W. Morey Award, American Ceramic Society, recognizing "new and original work in the field of glass science and technology."
- 2025 - SPIE Aden & Marjorie Meinel Technology Achievement Award, International Society of Optical Engineering (SPIE), for "pioneering contributions to the invention, maturation, and application of semiconductor optoelectronic fibers"

== Bibliography ==
=== Books ===
- The Handbook of Photonics, 2nd Edition (2006) ISBN 9780849330957
- Optoelectronics: Advanced Materials and Devices (2013) ISBN 9789535109228
- Optoelectronics: Materials and Devices (2015) ISBN 9789535121749
- Fiber Lasers XII: Technology, Systems, and Applications (2015) ISBN 9781628414349
- Optoelectronics: Advanced Device Structures (2017) ISBN 9789535133698
- Sixth International Workshop on Specialty Optical Fibers and Their Applications (WSOF 2019): Conference Digest (2019) ISBN 9781510631618

=== Selected articles ===
- Ballato, J., & Snitzer, E. (1995). Fabrication of fibers with high rare-earth concentrations for Faraday isolator applications. Applied Optics, 34(30), 6848–54.
- Ballato, J., Hawkins, T., Foy, P., Stolen, R., Kokuoz, B., Ellison, M., ... & Powers, D. R. (2008). Silicon optical fiber. Optics Express, 16(23), 18675–83.
- Dragic, P., Hawkins, T. W., Foy, P., Morris, S., & Ballato, J. (2012). Sapphire-derived all-glass optical fibres. Nature Photonics, 6(9), 627–33.
- Ballato, J., & Dragic, P. (2013). Rethinking optical fiber: new demands, old glasses. Journal of the American Ceramic Society, 96(9), 2675–92.
- Knall, J., Vigneron, P. B., Engholm, M., Dragic, P. D., Yu, N., Ballato, J., ... & Digonnet, M. J. (2020). Laser cooling in a silica optical fiber at atmospheric pressure. Optics Letters, 45(5), 1092–95.
