= Michael J. Padilla =

American academic

Michael J. Padilla is the former Director of the Eugene P. Moore School of Education and Associate Dean of EC at Clemson University, from Spring 2007 until July 2012. Before then he was Aderhold Distinguished Professor of Science Education at the University of Georgia in Athens, Georgia. Dr. Padilla was recognized with The Walter B. Hill Award for Distinguished Achievement in Public Service at the University of Georgia and was presented with the National Science Teachers Association (NSTA) Distinguished Service award in 2003. In 2012 Padilla was awarded the NSTA Robert H. Carleton award for national leadership, the association's most prestigious award. The Carleton Award recognizes an NSTA member who has made outstanding contributions to and provided leadership in science education at the national level and to NSTA in particular; it is NSTA's highest award. He has extensive leadership experience, having served as PI on four National Science Foundation and numerous US Department of Education grants for a total of over $36 million in funding. In recent years he has focused on the issue of English Language Learners through the Center for Latino Achievement and Success in Education (CLASE) at UGA and the Clemson University Commission on Latino Affairs, both of which he directed.

== Education and early career ==
Padilla received a B.S. in biology from the University of Detroit in 1967, an M.Ed. in science education from Wayne State University in 1972, and a Ph.D. in science education from Michigan State University in 1975. He began his career as a middle and high school science teacher, and then taught at the University of Victoria in British Columbia. In 1978 he went to the University of Georgia, where he rose from assistant to full professor, to associate dean.

== National Science Teachers Association ==
In 2005-2006 he was president of the National Science Teachers Association. Padilla is well known to the international science education community and engaged in a cooperative research project with Japanese scholars on Japanese education. The theme of his presidency was "Developing a World View for Science Education."[3] When President George W. Bush suggested teaching Intelligent design in classrooms, then NSTA president Padilla replied: "It is simply not fair to present pseudoscience to students in the science classroom," and that "Nonscientific viewpoints have little value in increasing students' knowledge of the natural world."[4] He remains active with NSTA through several international and national efforts..[5] He helped develop the National Science Education Standards, released in 1995, contributed to the review of the Next Generation Science Standards, released in 2013, and has written extensively about science education, including many articles, books and book chapters.[3]

With Pearson, Dr. Padilla has been a lead author on these titles:

Prentice Hall Science Explorer was a widely used middle school science program through 2011. The series, led by author Michael Padilla, combined science content with inquiry-based learning activities. The program was available either as 16 individual books or as grouped Life, Earth, and Physical Science series, allowing schools and teachers to adapt materials to local standards, curricula, and teaching approaches.

Interactive Science, developed by a team of scientists and science educators; is a K-8 science program that incorporates practices in science instruction, featuring the Understanding by Design learning framework, the 5-E Instructional Model, and an emphasis on science, technology, engineering and mathematics (STEM), as well as 21st Century skills.[1] The program includes the following features:

- Employs a distinct and unique student experience - an interactive write in student text. This allows students a medium to process information while they are learning it, to focus on key reading, writing, and communication skills in perfect partnership with science content.
- Offers multiple pathways to learning that is also unprecedented with informal, formal, STEM, and activity-centric learning to ensure a key focus on inquiry at every stage of instruction.
- Ensures all students can learn with a robust digital component - the Digital Path - that both mirrors and extends the core instruction through interactive media, videos, virtual labs, and an online "kinesthetic" that requires students to be active, participatory learners and not simply "press play."

== Resources ==
- Prentice Hall Science Explorer (books).
- PHSchool Website
