= Nicholas Vazsonyi =

American academic

- Occupations: Academic, author, and artistic director

Academic background
- Education: B.A., German; M.A., German; Ph.D., Germanic Langs.
- Alma mater: Indiana University Bloomington; University of California, Los Angeles

Academic work
- Institutions: Clemson University; Vanderbilt University; University of South Carolina (UofSC)

Nicholas Vazsonyi is an American academic, author, and artistic director. Since 2023, he has served as Dean of the College of Arts and Humanities at Clemson University.

Vazsonyi has authored articles on German national identity, German literature and cultures of the 18th through the 20th centuries, and cultural intersections of music, literature and film. His research interests include composer Richard Wagner and literary figure Johann Wolfgang von Goethe. He is the author of two books: Lukács Reads Goethe: From Aestheticism to Stalinism, and Richard Wagner: Self-Promotion and the Making of a Brand, translated into German as Richard Wagner: Die Entstehung einer Marke. He has conceived and edited several volumes, including The Cambridge Wagner Encyclopedia and the Cambridge Companion to Wagner’s Der Ring des Nibelungen. He is also the Writer and Director of the 4-part Video/DVD film series, titled Klassix-13: Mozart – Beethoven – Schubert – Brahms.

He is the co-editor of WagnerSpectrum and serves on the advisory board of the Wagner Society of New York and the journal Leitmotive.

== Early life and education ==
Vazsonyi was born on May 31, 1963, in Traverse City, Michigan. His father was Balint Vazsonyi. The family moved to London in 1964, where he received his early education at Westminster Under School and later at Westminster School in London. In 1978, the family moved to Bloomington, Indiana, where he graduated summa cum laude with a B.A. in German from Indiana University in 1982. He later enrolled at the University of California, Los Angeles (UCLA), and earned his M.A. and a Ph.D. degree in Germanic Languages in 1988 and 1993, respectively.

While at Indiana University, Vazsonyi trained to become an opera stage director, and worked behind the scenes at its opera theater. He also attended Tito Gobbi’s opera workshop at the Villa Schifanoia in Fiesole (1981), and worked under the director Hans Neugebauer as an apprentice at the Lyric Opera of Chicago (1981) and under Götz Friedrich at the Deutsche Oper in Berlin (1982).

== Career ==
Vazsonyi started his career in 1982 as a legal assistant at Barnes & Thornburg, at that time based solely in Indianapolis. In 1984, he left to join his father and become artistic director of Telemusic, Incorporated, a company formed to make a series of four 1-hour documentaries about classical composers. From 1994 until 1997, he was an assistant professor of German at Vanderbilt University and briefly at the University of South Carolina (UofSC), Columbia. He was promoted to associate professor in 2001, to Professor in 2010, and became Jesse Chapman Alcorn Memorial Professor of Foreign Languages in 2011. In 2020, he left UofSC for Clemson University to become Dean of the College of Architecture, Arts & Humanities, which was reorganized into the College of Arts and Humanities in 2023 with Architecture separating off.

Vazsonyi also held administrative appointments in his career. He became Director of the German Studies Program at UofSC in 2002, and Graduate Director of the Department of Languages, Literatures and Cultures in 2004. From 2013 until 2020, he served as Chair of the Department of Languages, Literatures & Cultures at the University of South Carolina.

== Research ==
Vazsonyi's first book examined Hungarian Marxist philosopher Georg Lukács, arguing that, despite his radical turn from modernist aesthete to committed communist, accompanied by a wholesale reassessment of his literary preferences, he managed to retain his favorite author, Johann Wolfgang von Goethe, by consistently reinterpreting his works to align with the current political climate. Vazsonyi next turned his attention to German national identity formation between the late 18th and mid-19th centuries. His edited volume, Searching for Common Ground, along with a set of journal articles, argued that the beginning of the national project could be traced to the mid-18th century, a good half century earlier than historians had previously considered.

After receiving tenure in 2001, Vazsonyi returned to his earlier interest in music and opera, and combined it with his ongoing research on German culture and national identity formation by focusing on the composer Richard Wagner. This became his main area of scholarship for the next two decades. His first major publication was a volume on Die Meistersinger von Nürnberg, which brought together essays by both scholars as well as active performers, including Dietrich Fischer-Dieskau, the stage director Harry Kupfer and the conductor Peter Schneider.

In 2010, Cambridge University Press published Vazsonyi's major monograph Richard Wagner: Self-Promotion and the Making of a Brand which argued that Wagner used techniques that would only become standard many decades later to fashion himself and his approach to composing as a brand. The book received wide critical acclaim, including a review from the Wall Street Journal that said "...written with panache and elan, conveying with refreshing brevity a palpable sense of Wagner's indefatigable industry...the first scholarly text to take seriously Wagner's incessant self-promotional activity, Mr. Vazsonyi's book assumes considerable importance not only in musicology but also in the history of marketing."

Following the success of Vazsonyi's book, Cambridge UP invited him to draft and produce the Cambridge Wagner Encyclopedia (2013) and, most recently, the Cambridge Companion to Wagner's Der Ring des Nibelungen which he co-produced with London-based music historian Mark Berry.

== Awards and honors ==
- 1986-88 - Chancellor's Fellow, University of California, Los Angeles
- 1997 - Grant from German Academic Exchange Service (DAAD)
- 2009 - Russell Research Award for Humanities and Social Sciences, University of South Carolina

== Videography ==
- Klassix-13: Mozart – Beethoven – Schubert – Brahms. Documentary series of 4 one-hour videocassettes. Co-Written & Directed Nicholas Vazsonyi. A Telemusic Production in CoProduction with MTV Hungarian Television & TV Ontario. MPI 1989.
- Great Masters of Classical Music: Mozart. Written & Directed by Nicholas Vazsonyi. WinklerFilm, Vienna & DELTA Music, 2003.

== Books ==
- Lukács Reads Goethe: From Aestheticism to Stalinism (1997) ISBN 9781571131140
- Richard Wagner: Self-Promotion and the Making of a Brand (2010) ISBN 9781139486460
- Richard Wagner: Die Entstehung einer Marke (2012) ISBN 9783826080074

== Edited books ==
- Searching for Common Ground: Diskurse zur deutschen Identität (2000) ISBN 9783412138998
- Wagner’s Meistersinger: Performance, History, Representation (2003) ISBN 9781580461313
- The Cambridge Wagner Encyclopedia (2013) ISBN 9781107004252
- Music Theater as Global Culture: Wagner’s Legacy Today (2017) ISBN 9783826054303
- The Cambridge Companion to Richard Wagner’s Der Ring des Nibelungen (2020) ISBN 9781107108516

== Selected articles ==
- Vazsonyi, N. (1989). Goethe's Wilhelm Meisters Lehrjahre: A Question of Talent. The German Quarterly, pages 39–47.
- Vazsonyi, N. (1996). Searching for ‘The Order of Things’: Does Goethe's Faust, Part II Suffer from the 'Fatal Conceit'? Monatshefte. pages 83–94.
- Vazsonyi, N. (1999). Montesquieu, Friedrich Carl von Moser, and the "National Spirit Debate" in Germany, 1765–1767. German Studies Review, pages 225–246.
- Vazsonyi, N. (2001). Bluebeard's Castle: Staging the Screen - Screening the Stage. Arcadia 36.2: pages 344–362.
- Vazsonyi, N. (2007). Beethoven Instrumentalized: Richard Wagner's Self-Marketing and Media Image. Music & Letters, pages 195–211.
- Vazsonyi, N. (2014). Reading Right from Left: Hans Mayer and Postwar Wagner Reception. The Opera Quarterly, pages 228–245.
