= Clemson University International Center for Automotive Research =

Coordinates: 34.814297°N 82.327111°W

The Clemson University International Center for Automotive Research (CU-ICAR) is a 250-acre (1.0 km^{2}) automotive and motorsports research campus in Greenville, South Carolina. The facility includes a graduate school offering Master's and Doctoral degrees in automotive engineering, and offering programs focused on systems integration.

Ozen Engineering Incorporated announced plans to base its East Coast operations at CU-ICAR.
