= Johnstone Hall =

Coordinates: 34.679852°N 82.838049°W

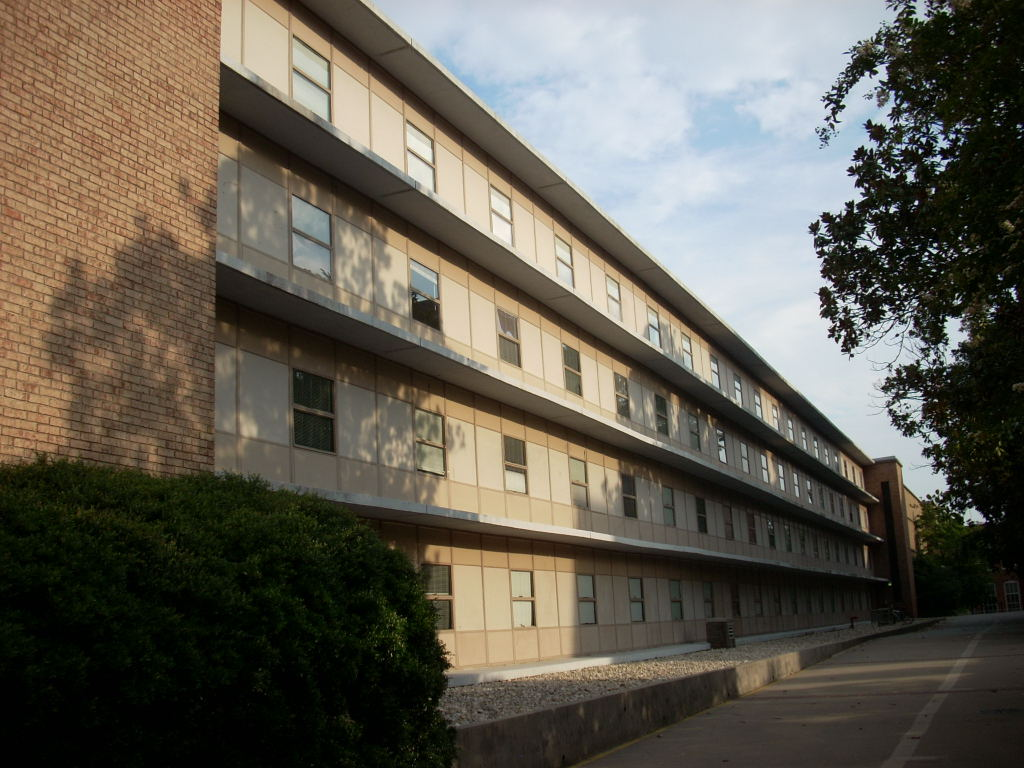
Johnstone Hall, formerly Johnstone A-section in July 2007.

Johnstone Hall was a dormitory at Clemson University, Clemson, South Carolina that has housed several generations of Clemson undergraduates. Located on west campus, it originally overlooked the student laundry, the coal-burning Physical Plant and the university fire department, and beyond that the stadium and Lake Hartwell. It is named for an original Clemson trustee and, later, chairman of the board, Alan Johnstone, (served 1890–1894, 1905–1929.) Sections B through F where torn down as the campus expanded, and until 2025 all that remained was section A and it's annex.

== History ==
Erected in 1954, the Johnstone Hall complex design became a model for college dormitories, implementing a new raise-slab construction method, a practice which was featured in many architectural magazines at that time. This method - the Youtz-Slick "lift-slab" method - lifted reinforced concrete slabs onto columns with hydraulic jacks. These slabs weighed 224 tons and were nine inches thick, 122 feet long and 43 feet wide. Johnstone Hall was the largest building complex erected using this method. Campus legend had it that two other similar structures built elsewhere collapsed before completion. Clemson's first African-American student, future Charlotte North Carolina mayor, Harvey Gantt, resided in Johnstone Hall in 1963. Today, only one of the original Johnstone buildings is still standing on the campus. Most of the rooms had been taken out of use by the mid-1990s as obsolete (electrical wiring wasn't grounded, and is still not grounded in the remaining structure).

=== Description ===
Situated on sloping ground directly opposite the John C. Calhoun mansion of Fort Hill, Johnstone replaced a group of free-standing barracks dating from Clemson's early military college days. Six residence hall sections, A through F, existed on nine numbered levels, but with no single section boasting more than five floors, as the structure followed the contours of the site in an irregular horseshoe open on the north side. Harcombe Commons dining hall was attached to the A-section interior on level five. Cinder block annex wings were added onto the ends of A and F sections to increase capacity by the early 1960s. A central student resource center separated A and B sections. This separation would eventually allow females to be housed in A section, while the remaining sections remained all male.

An open air loggia on the ground-floor (level six) at the hilltop overlooked an assembly quadrangle designed to accommodate cadet formations. The canteen, one floor below the loggia, faced the formation area. The paved quadrangle, lately serving as parking, was redeveloped into a new student union and student government chambers in the mid-1970s. The campus student locator phone office, the West Campus housing office, student government chambers, a small campus retreat chapel (later converted to a job placement office), and all the student media were located in the three levels above the loggia.

During the fall 1991 and spring 1992 semesters, B and C sections were demolished and replaced with the more modern McCabe and Holmes Halls both of which opened up in the fall of 1994. D section was closed as a residence hall in the mid-1990s, but continued to be used as a university storage facility. E and F sections remained open until 2001, when they were demolished along with D section.

A section underwent a minor renovation in 1999. It was then used as a co-ed residence for several years before returning to all men during the fall of 2011.

In 2007, an architect was contracted to redesign the Student Union. The design called for the demolition of most of the original structures of the union, including the remaining Johnstone facilities. A year later, all University construction projects were halted due to lack of funding and the remodel, as well as the concurrent demolition, was never carried out.
