= The Tiger (newspaper) =

Clemson University student newspaper

- Front page of the February 12, 2015, issue
- Type: Weekly student newspaper
- Format: Broadsheet
- School: Clemson University
- Editor-in-chief: Blake Mauro
- Associate editor: Justin Robertson
- Managing editor: Sydney Westphal
- Business Manager: Kaylee Morris
- Founded: January 21, 1907; 118 years ago
- Language: English
- Headquarters: 720 McMillan Road; 311 Hendrix Student Center; Clemson, SC 29634
- Country: United States
- Website: thetigercu.com

The Tiger is the student newspaper at Clemson University in Clemson, South Carolina. It is the oldest college newspaper in the state of South Carolina and publishes a print edition once a month during both the fall and spring semesters, with occasional summer editions. It publishes online throughout the week during the fall and spring semesters, with over 30 members on its senior staff.

In August 2014, The Tiger started publishing twice weekly, on Tuesday and Thursday. One year later, in August 2015, the paper began publishing on Monday and Thursday. By 2017, it was publishing once a week on Monday. Today, The Tiger publishes print editions every two weeks and online content weekly during the school year.
