= Lewis Dillahunty =

American militia officer and settler (1793–1826)

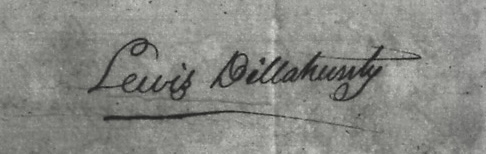
- Born: July 18, 1793; North Carolina
- Died: June 16, 1826 (aged 32); Hardeman County, Tennessee
- Known for: Militia officer in Creek War and at Battle of New Orleans, early settler of the Muscle Shoals region of Alabama, territorial and state legislator

Lewis Dillahunty (July 18, 1793–June 16, 1826) was an American military officer, pioneer settler, state legislator, and businessman. He was an officer of Tennessee militia during the War of 1812 and subsequently an early settler of Alabama. The ledger record he kept of his service under William Carroll is an important primary source for studying Tennessee militia participation in the Battle of New Orleans. At war's end he submitted a message to Tennessee General Assembly arguing that statutory reforms were needed in order to forestall future instances of the kind of insubordination and logistical failure that had plagued the state militia during the War of 1812. He moved to the Tennessee River valley section of northern Alabama at an early day, and was said to have had some undefined but significant role in the treaty negotiations that resulted in major Cherokee land cessions. Dillahunty represented Lawrence County in the legislature of Alabama Territory and in the first session of the Alabama state legislature. He returned to Tennessee in 1825 and died in Hardeman County in 1826.

== Early life ==
Lewis Dillahunty's father was Thomas Dillahunty. Thomas Dillahunty was from Jones County, North Carolina, and at an early day purchased land four miles from the frontier blockhouse that then stood for Nashville, in Davidson County, Tennessee. Thomas Dillahunty had four sons, Edmund Dillahunty (later a lawyer and judge near Columbia, Tennessee), Lewis Dillahunty, Harvey Dillahunty (later an Alabama state representative), and John Dillahunty.

== Creek War and Battle of New Orleans ==
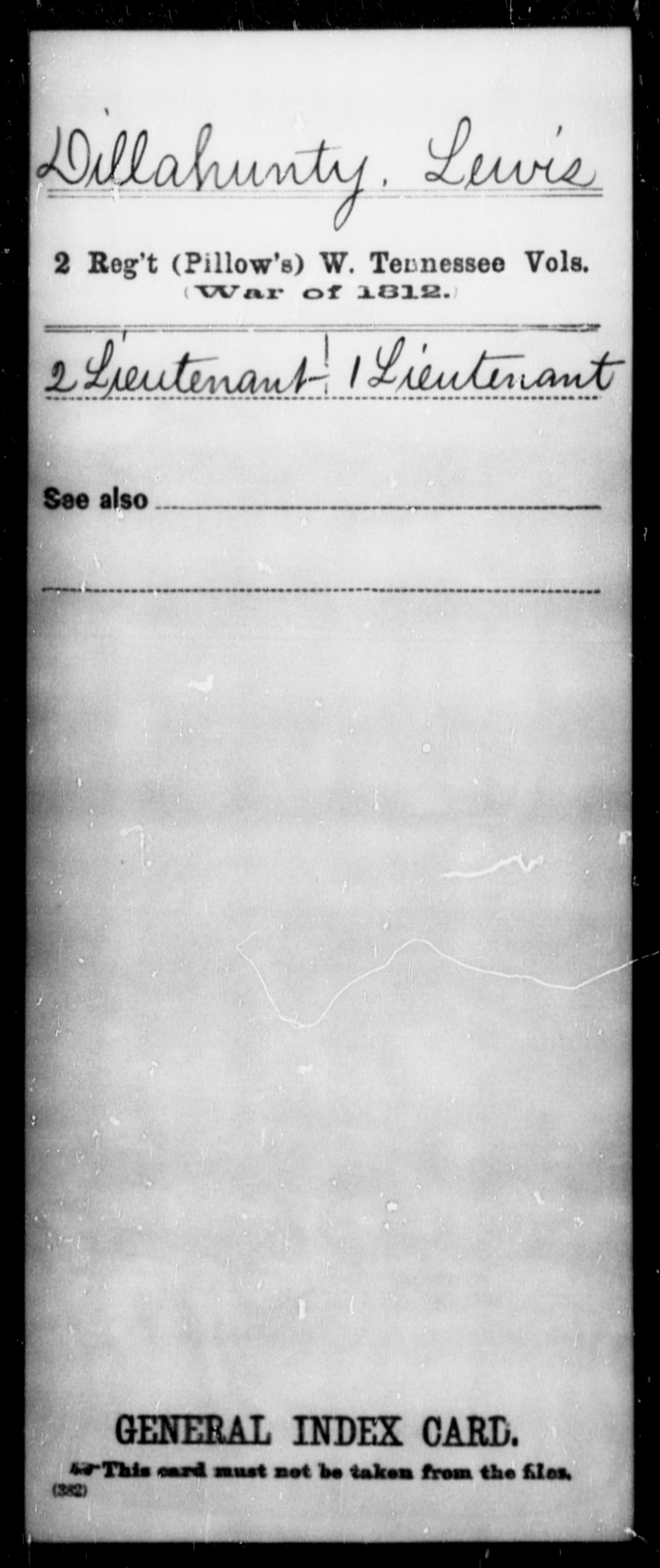
Envelope for Dillahunty's summary service record (Digital Public Library of America)

At the beginning of the Creek War, Dillahunty volunteered for the Tennessee militia, was commissioned a lieutenant in Andrew Hyne's company and was ranked as captain by May 1814. According to his widow's application for a government pension, Dillahunty was in the battles of Talladega and Horseshoe Bend. Dillahunty returned to service later that year when "Gen. Wm. Carroll made a sudden call for 3000 volunteer infantry for the defence of New Orleans, to rendezvous at Nashville on the 13th of November, 1814. Captain Dillahunty not only was on the ground at the appointed time, but had a full company completely organized, raised in Davidson and Williamson counties. Daniel Bradford, so well known since at Huntsville as General Bradford, was his first lieutenant. The captain kept a blank book in which he recorded all General Carroll's general orders, and such special ones as related to his company, also muster-rolls, requisitions for supplies of provisions and ammunition, a list of casualties, etc., from that day until the return of the army to Nashville." Dillahunty was breveted major after the Battle of New Orleans. A report by Dillahunty about the placement of Kentucky troops on the battlefield was surfaced as evidence in an extended dispute between Jackson and John Adair about the comparative value of Tennesseans and Kentuckians at the battle.

Carroll wrote in his account of the battle, which was published in Niles' Register, "Major Dillahunty, captain Bradford and lieutenant Murdock of the volunteer corps, sustained the right of our line during the whole of the siege, with credit to themselves and advantage to their country." Carroll then assigned Dillahunty to escort the sick and wounded back to Nashville; the steamer Vesuvius transported them to Natchez, and then Dillahunty organized a wagon train to take them back up the Natchez Trace with as much medical care as was feasible along the way. Dillahunty's record of his unit and his journey with the wounded was kept by his descendants and remains an important primary source on the southwestern theater of the War of 1812. The official record of his career ranks is "Sec lt and Adjutant of Pillow's reg. Ten 3 mos. Volrs. 26 Sept. '13.-Capt in Metcalfe's reg. Ten 6 mos. Volrs. Nov. 14: Major 1 Jan. '15 in defence of N. Orleans."

Dillahunty arrived in Nashville with his charges on April 15, 1815, and on April 18, 1815, the 22-year-old Tennessee militiaman was married to his fiancée, Lucinda Johnson.

The autumn following the conclusion of the war, Dillahunty advised the state legislature to reform the militia system but no action was taken.

Major Lewis Dillahunty of the West Tennessee militia submitted a petition in September 1815 to the Tennessee General Assembly suggesting changes be made to the state militia's regulations. "The War lately terminated has proven that the present organization & discipline of the militia of Tennessee is full of imperfections," Dillahunty stated. He added a quote from William Duane's 1810 Military Dictionary, a work he felt should be mandatory reading for all militia members: "an army without discipline & subordination is but a mob more dangerous to itself, than to its enemy." Actually, in Duane's original text, the word subordination is not mentioned. The fact that Dillahunty included it reflects the in-subordination demonstrated by the militia during the war. The Tennessee legislature took no action on Dillahunty's petition, perhaps an indication of the impact the New Orleans victory had on the merits of the militia.

— Tom Kanon (2014), Tennesseans at War, 1812–1815

== Alabama pioneer ==
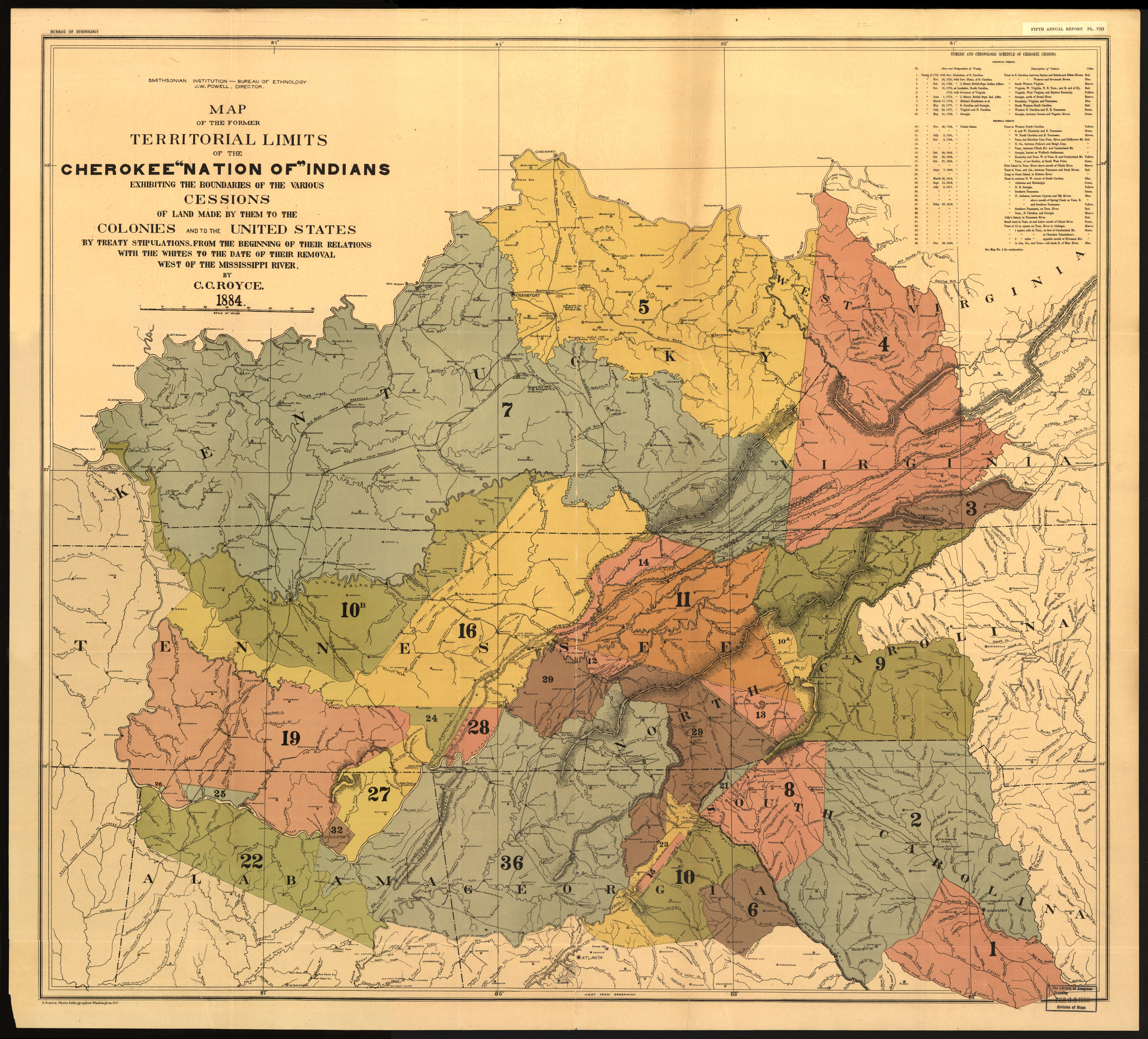
Cherokee domain before land cessions, expulsion, and deportation (Library of Congress item 99446145)

In 1816, the Dillahuntys relocated to Mississippi Territory, where Lewis Dillahunty was said to be the first White settler at what is now Courtland, Alabama, from whence he was involved in negotiating with the resident Indians. Other accounts have it that there was a settlement called Ebenezer at Courtland before Dillahunty ever arrived.

Courtland "was laid out on the site of a Cherokee town, and was surrounded by old fields, on which Indian cabins were still standing when I first saw it, in 1821. The mound builders had been there before the Cherokees, and left on the west side of [Big Nance Creek] one of their largest monuments." The origin of the name of Big Nance Creek is unclear, but various accounts have it that "creek was named for a Native American woman whose name meant Nancy. When her lover betrayed her, she drowned herself in the creek. Another report said Dillahunty named the creek for Nancy, France, the home of his parents. Another story said the creek was named for a large man named Chief Big Nance." There is a letter from Dillahunty to John Coffee in the Dyas Collection of John Coffee Papers (1770–1917) at the Tennessee State Library describing "soil, water, range, extent of lands opposite Muscle Shoals recently ceded by the Creeks."

In the telling of Alabama chronicler James Saunders, "On the recommendation of General Jackson, Major Dillahunty was sent by President Monroe as an agent to prepare the minds of the Indians for this cession...Whether he was an Indian agent or a confidential emissary of the government, I have not been able to ascertain. A constant correspondence passed between Mr. Monroe and him. He made himself very popular with the Indians, and in 1817, when his patron, General Jackson, attempted to purchase all the Cherokee lands, he succeeded in getting that part occupied by the Indians (Morgan, Lawrence, Franklin counties), through the personal influence of Major Dillahunty." In a 1986 history of the pre-Removal Cherokee, William G. McLoughlin wrote that, "Because the tract in northern Alabama (which became a territory in 1817 and a state in 1819) constituted about half of the area of the Cherokee Lower Town region, where many chiefs had been discontented ever since Doublehead's assassination and the rise of the young chiefs to dominance, Jackson found it easier to make his argument here than elsewhere. He did his best to cajole, bribe, and threaten the Cherokees in Alabama to secede from their nation and go west." Jackson, as Indian commissioner plenipotentiary, was involved in negotiating the Treaty of Turkeytown in 1816 and the Jackson-McMinn Treaty in 1817, which ceded parcels of land in Georgia, Alabama, and Tennessee that had previously been titled to the Cherokee. Per research by the Alabama Historical Commission, "Although his precise role is unclear, Dillahunty—a Tennessean and distinguished veteran of the Battle of New Orleans—is reputed to have played a key role in negotiating the cession of this choice territory from the beleaguered Cherokees and Chickasaws. In any event, the alluvial lands enveloping the future town site and stretching across what is now northern Lawrence County were eagerly snapped up by speculators and expansion-minded planters when auctioned off at Huntsville in September of 1818. Lawrence County itself came into existence on February 4th of that year and the county tract book reveals that most of the land about Courtland was taken up in quarter-section parcels (160 acres) or more, with a few individuals like Robert Watkins and Benjamin Sherrod—men destined to become planter barons in early Alabama—acquiring much larger tracts."

== Political service and business enterprises ==
Dillahunty was elected to the general assembly of Alabama Territory in 1817, representing Lawrence County. He was elected to the same position in the state legislature in 1819. Dillahunty "lived three years at Courtland, and then moved to the neighborhood of Mount Pleasant church. He purchased lands for his father, Thomas Dillahunty, and for his father-in-law, John Johnson." John Johnson had migrated from Virginia to Tennessee and then to Alabama around 1829. The John Johnson House, also known as Green Onion, is on the National Register of Historic Places. The Green Onion plantation land was first purchased on September 16, 1818 "by the assignees of John Hughes at the U. S. government land sales in Huntsville. Hughes, like many other initial buyers of the rich Tennessee Valley cotton lands, appears to have been interested primarily in the speculative value of the 160-acre parcel. At any rate, a decade later, on April 8, 1829, eighty acres of this tract—including the house site on a hill above Kittikaski Branch—was conveyed to John Johnson for six hundred dollars. Johnson may have been living on the land for several years prior to this time, so that the 1829 deed represents only the final conveyance."

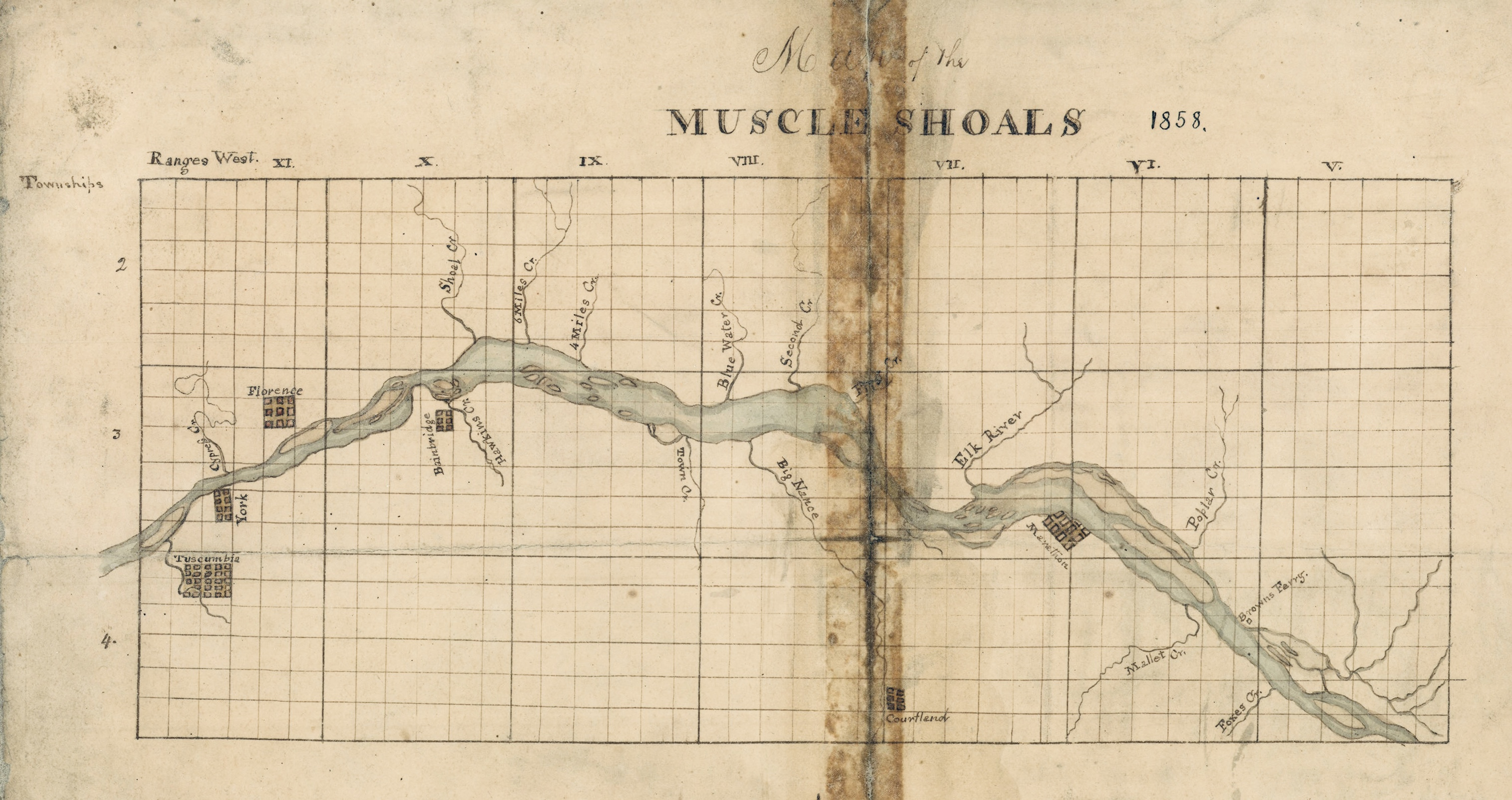
This hand-colored map of the Muscle Shoals section of the Tennessee River has been in the Tennessee State Library and Archives since 1858; it shows Florence, Courtland, and Tuscumbia, as well as the planned but unrealized towns of York, Bainbridge, and Marathon, Alabama (Tennessee Virtual Archive item 42391)

On February 3, 1819, Lewis Dillahunty was appointed to be postmaster at Marathon, Alabama Territory, an aspirational town located on land owned by Andrew Jackson at Melton's Bluff on the Muscle Shoals. Another account has Dillahunty as "bonded postmaster" at Marathon around 1815. In 1820 Dillahunty announced in the Nashville Banner that he had erected a "commodious warehouse" at Bainbridge, and he would "receive, store, mark, and store cotton gratis, provided it is shipped by him and his associates to New-Orleans; for which boats will be constantly ready after the 1st day of November next." In August 1824, Dillahunty wrote a public letter articulating Andrew Jackson's position on tariffs.

Lewis Dillahunty left Lawrence County, Alabama for Hardeman County, Tennessee in 1825. Dillahunty died in Hardeman County in 1826.

== Personal life ==
The Dillahuntys had four children, two of whom survived to adulthood: Sallie Dillahunty Merrit, and William Carroll Dillahunty. Dillahunty's widow spent many years pursuing a government pension based on her husband's war service but was refused multiple times because they were married after the war, not before. Dillahunty's mother-in-law Jane Johnson was buried in 1834 at the Bainbridge town cemetery, now submerged under the Tennessee Valley Authority's Wilson Lake Reservoir.

== See also ==
- Courtland Historic District
- Andrew Jackson and land speculation
- Andrew Jackson's plantations in northern Alabama

== Sources ==
- n.a. (n.d.). "'Tidewater Cottages' in the Tennessee Valley - Thematic Group - John Johnson House "The Green Onion"". nps.gov.
- Clark, Eva Turner (July 1925). "Notes and Queries". The Virginia Magazine of History and Biography. 33 (3): 305–306. ISSN 0042-6636. JSTOR 4244027.
- Brown, Orlando; Clift, G. Glenn (October 1951). "The Governors of Kentucky [1792–1824]". The Register of the Kentucky Historical Society. 49 (169): 349–373. ISSN 0023-0243. JSTOR 23373784.
- Cheathem, Mark R. (2014). Andrew Jackson, Southerner. Baton Rouge, Louisiana: Louisiana State University Press. ISBN 978-0-8071-5099-3. LCCN 2012049695. OCLC 858995561. Project MUSE book 26506.
- Case File of Lewis Dillahunty (Lieut Capt Williamson's Co Tenn Mil, Capt Tenn Mil, Tennessee). Records of the Department of Veterans Affairs. Department of the Interior Bureau of Pensions. NAID 85204261, Bounty Land Warrant 26058, Widow's Original Pension Number 29502, Widow's Certificate Pension Number 4245, Search Identifiers 1812PB & Fold3 2018 – via archives.gov.
- Dillahunty, Lewis (2021). Laster, Brian (ed.). "Dillahunty's Company Book: Returning Home with the Sick & Wounded, Spring 1815" (PDF). Williamson County Historical Journal. 51 IX. Franklin, Tennessee: 69–100. LCCN 86642787. OCLC 14186085.
- Gamble, Robert (January 1991). "Courtland (Alabama) Historic District – National Register of Historic Places Registration Form". nps.gov. Alabama Historical Commission, Montgomery.
- Kanon, Tom (2014). Tennesseans at War, 1812–1815: Andrew Jackson, the Creek War, and the Battle of New Orleans. Tuscaloosa: University of Alabama Press. ISBN 9780817318291. LCCN 2013049815. OCLC 900093586. Project MUSE book 30812.
- McLoughlin, William Gerald (2018) [1986]. Cherokee Renascence in the New Republic (ebook ed.). Princeton, N.J.: Princeton University Press. ISBN 978-0-691-04741-6. JSTOR j.ctv39x611. LCCN 86042843. OCLC 13859438. OL 2129522W. Project MUSE book 61052.
- Saunders, James Edmonds; Stubbs, Elizabeth Saunders Blair (1899). Early Settlers of Alabama. New Orleans: L. Graham & Son. LCCN rc01002465. OCLC 2660177. OL 1619666W – via HathiTrust.
