= Cypress Land Company =

19th-century Alabama real-estate enterprise

The Cypress Land Company was an American real-estate development company established March 12, 1818, at the land office in Huntsville, Alabama Territory, United States, under articles of association drafted by judge John Overton. It was formed by the merger of two existing land companies, as a result of prodding by John McKinley. The original entities were the Tennessee Company, organized by Overton, John Coffee (at that time U.S. surveyor general for the area), James Jackson, and Andrew Jackson, and the Alabama Company, an association of investors including Leroy Pope, Thomas Bibb, Waddy Tait, McKinley, and James Madison (not the president). Pope and the Bibbs were said to be from Petersburg, Georgia, a town whose men invested heavily in early Alabama land.

Another account has Andrew Jackson's preceding land company being a cooperative of "John Childress, James Jackson, John Donelson, Andrew Jackson, and John Coffee, all of the frontier region, and Thomas Kirkman, John McCrea, and John Goddard of Philadelphia. The former were to arrange for the purchase, and the latter were to supply a large portion of the money necessary." John Donelson was Andrew Jackson's nephew or grandnephew by marriage (Donelson family), and Thomas Kirkman was James Jackson's brother-in-law.

The trustees of the Cypress Land Company, which platted and marketed the town of Florence, Alabama in the Muscle Shoals area of the Tennessee River basin, were Leroy Pope, Thomas Bibb, John Coffee, James Jackson, John Childress, Dabney Morris, and John McKinley. Lots in the town were sold just before the Panic of 1819; the trustees paid for a courthouse, jail, and tavern, so Florence was named the county seat of Lauderdale County.

Among the investors was John W. Walker, who bought six lots. Andrew Jackson also owned "a few shares".

A catastrophic fire destroyed the company's records on December 21, 1827. Arson was suspected. As reported in a Charleston, South Carolina, newspaper:

In Florence, Alabama, a two story brick honse, occupied as an office by the Surveyor General, the Register Printing Office, and the Post Office, destroyed by fire, on the 21st ult. The fire originaled in the Surveyor General's Office, in the second story; the whole of the property, papers, surveys, &c belonging, to that office, together with all the papers belonging to the Cypress Land Company, the private property of the Clerks in the office, consumed. Every thing belonging to the Post Office and Printing Office establishments, was removed before the fire broke into the lower story. The fire is supposed to have been by design.

Historians thus refer to an 1842 lawsuit to detail the early history of the company; the "bill of complaint" claimed that Cypress was plagued by "self-dealing, irresponsible acts, failure to pay dividends, and unjustified and unauthorized expenditures of company funds, particularly in the erection of public buildings donated to Lauderdale County". The final transaction in the company records and the liquidation of the company took place in 1851, at which time Florence had a population of a little over 800 people.

== See also ==
- 1828 United States presidential election
- Andrew Jackson and land speculation in the United States
- Andrew Jackson's plantations in northern Alabama
- Alabama real estate bubble of the 1810s
- Alabama fever
- Cotton Gin Treaty
- Treaty of the Chickasaw Council House (Chickasaw)
- Jackson and McMinn Treaty
- Melton's Bluff, Alabama
- Bainbridge, Alabama
- Downtown Florence Historic District
- Sannoner Historic District
- Cypress Creek (Alabama)

== Sources ==
- Chappell, Gordon T. (November 1949). "Some Patterns of Land Speculation in the Old Southwest". The Journal of Southern History. 15 (4): 463–477. doi:10.2307/2198383.
- Dupre, Daniel (May 1990). "Ambivalent Capitalists on the Cotton Frontier: Settlement and Development in the Tennessee Valley of Alabama". The Journal of Southern History. 56 (2): 215–240. doi:10.2307/2210232.
- Matrana, Marc R. (2009). Lost Plantations of the South. University Press of Mississippi. ISBN 978-1-57806-942-2.
- Rice, Turner (1975b). "The Cypress Land Company: A Dream of Empire". Journal of Muscle Shoals History. 3. University of North Alabama. Florence, Alabama: Tennessee Valley Historical Society: 21–35. ISSN 0094-8039. LCCN 74646773. OCLC 1795446.
- Sellers, Charles G. (June 1954). "Banking and Politics in Jackson's Tennessee, 1817–1827". The Mississippi Valley Historical Review. 41 (1): 61–84. doi:10.2307/1898150.
