= Andrew Jackson's plantations in northern Alabama =

Three sites owned 1816–1828

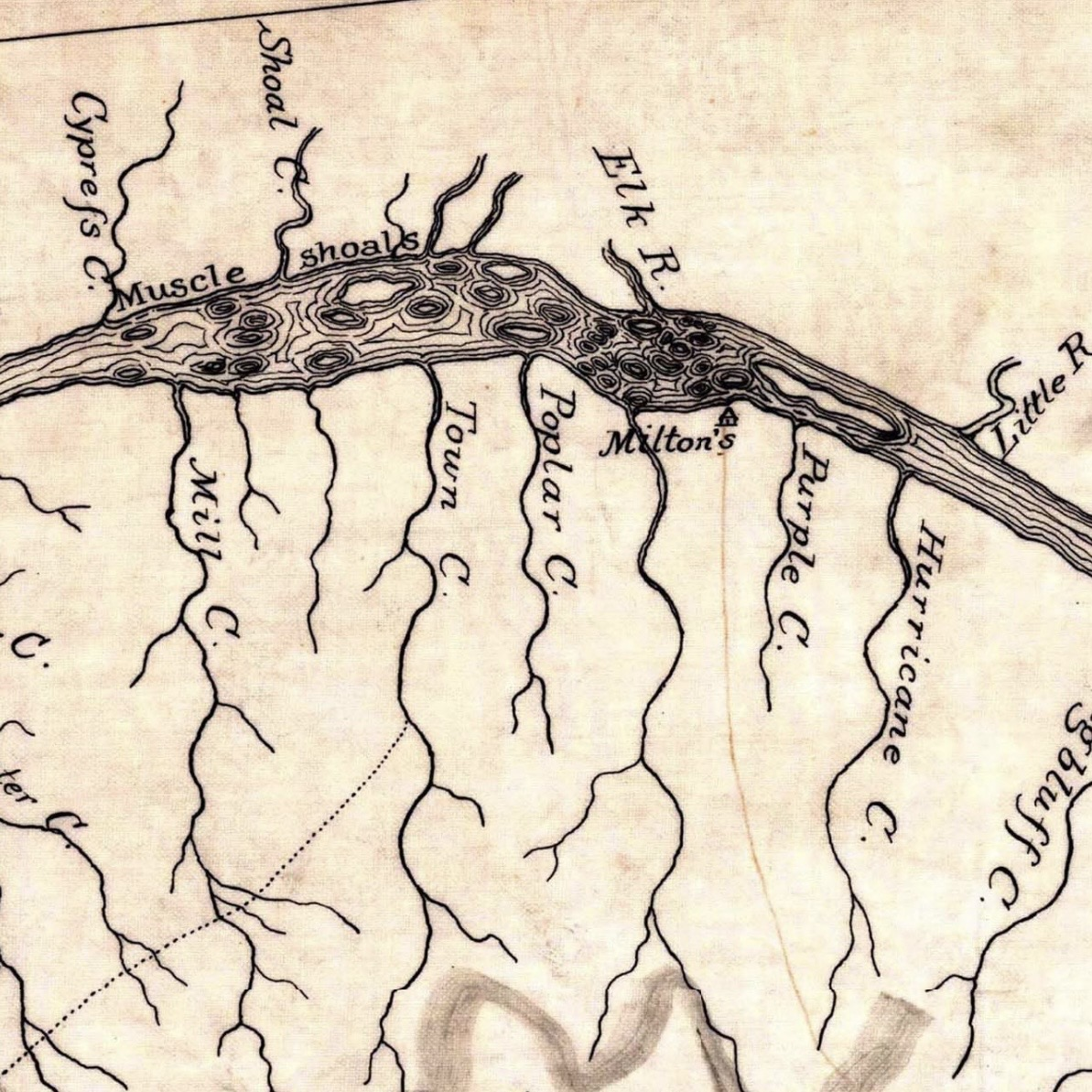
Detail of General Jackson's campaign against the Creek Indians 1813 & 1814 showing habitation at "Milton's" opposite the Elk River at the Muscle Shoals

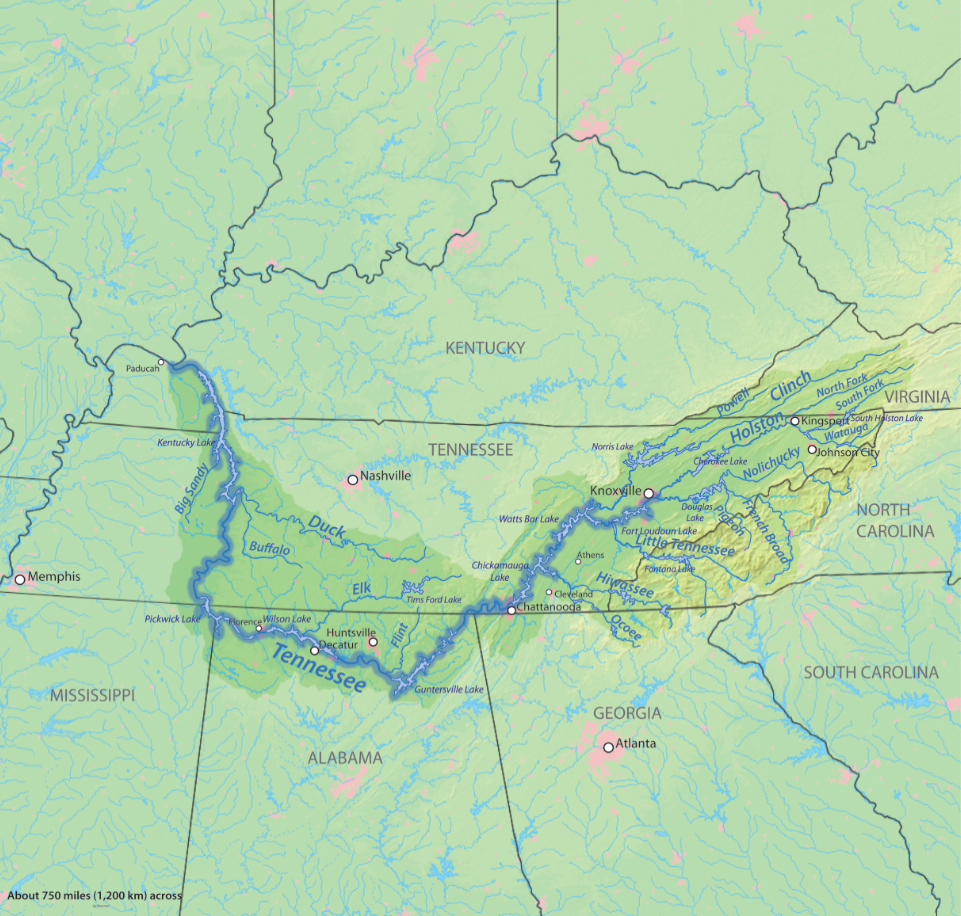
The Tennessee River watershed drains portions of seven U.S. states (Kentucky, Tennessee, Mississippi, Alabama, Georgia, North Carolina, and Virginia) before joining the Mississippi River near the southernmost extent of Illinois (Map by Shannon1)

In the 1810s and 1820s, future president of the United States Andrew Jackson owned three plantations in the Muscle Shoals region of northern Alabama, along the Tennessee River, at Melton's Bluff in Lawrence County, at Evans' Spring near Florence in Lauderdale County, and at Big Spring in Franklin County (later Tuscumbia in Colbert County).

Jackson knew about the "potential of North Alabama for settlement" because of "repeated travels" through the country, due to his trading business, and warring with the Creeks and the Seminoles as a major general of Tennessee militia and the United States Army. In the words of one historian, "It is striking to see how Jackson's ventures in plantation building in Alabama between 1816 through 1821, like [Halycon plantation] in Mississippi 15 years later, followed closely the surrender of these lands by the Indian tribes he had subdued." Jackson was rarely, if ever, resident at any of these plantations, which were investment properties, or remote forced-labor camps. His enslaved farm laborers and overseers grew, or attempted to grow, cotton in the vicinity of Muscle Shoals for six years, from 1817 to 1822. One historian wrote of his agricultural investments: "...being a planter was of the highest importance to Jackson. It does not mean that he made his greatest success in this field...' 'He did not make as brilliant a success in farming as some of his neighbors. He lived in too high a manner for that.'" The neighbors in question were in many cases his long-time associates and kinsmen; Jackson communicated orders about his land and slaves to them by mail. Jackson and Donelson family in-laws who lived in the area contributed to the development and marketing of four towns along the shoals, Florence, Marathon, York's Bluff, and Bainbridge; only Florence lasted much past the trading post and plat map stage, the other three were phantom settlements.

These plantations were located on land he had personally negotiated be ceded to the United States in his capacity as U.S. Indian commissioner plenipotentiary. Many of his fellow treaty commissioners, aides-de-camp, War of 1812 compatriots, and in-laws bought in the same vicinity at the same time. In the words of biographer Mark R. Cheathem, he "used his knowledge of the lands that he seized from the southeastern Indians to benefit himself and his friends." He encouraged others to buy in the region as well, writing Francis Smith, for instance, "Should you be inclined to invest funds in those lands, it will afford me pleasure to give you any aid in my power...This section of country present[s] to the capitalist greater prospects of advantage—than any other[.] what little I can command will be invested in land in that quarter." Jackson's fascination with the prospects of the Tennessee River valley in Alabama was widely shared: In 1810 the sole organized jurisdiction (Madison County, encompassing Huntsville and environs) had 4,700 residents. At the time of the next diennial census, in 1820, the river ran through seven counties with "a combined population of 59,969, representing over 40 percent of the state's population of 144,317."

A large number of his friends and relations, including James C. Bronaugh, John Coffee, James Gadsden, and James Jackson, settled in the Tennessee River valley, imported droves of slaves from all quarters to labor on the newly accessible land, and operated real estate companies that surveyed and marketed potential town sites. None of Jackson's plantation investments or attempts at land speculation were particularly lucrative for him personally—he seemingly struggled as a mostly absentee owner, since most of his time was consumed with illegally invading and occupying Florida and whatnot. He was forever hiring and firing overseers and dictating to "sons, wards, and neighbors" about the land and attached slaves, but he failed to engage as ferociously with the land and labor of farming as he did with military expeditions and political battles. The Panic of 1819 also did him no favors, but many of his more staid and fiscally prudent friends operating in the same milieu became wildly wealthy planter-barons of Alabama. The conservative agrarianism of Jacksonian democracy was theoretically predicated on "economy, self-sufficiency, and freedom from debt" but Jackson himself was "was often unable to make practicable [this philosophy] when confronted with plantation problems." Jackson sold off his last piece of Tennessee River real estate shortly before he ran for president the second time, in 1828.

== Melton's Bluff plantation ==
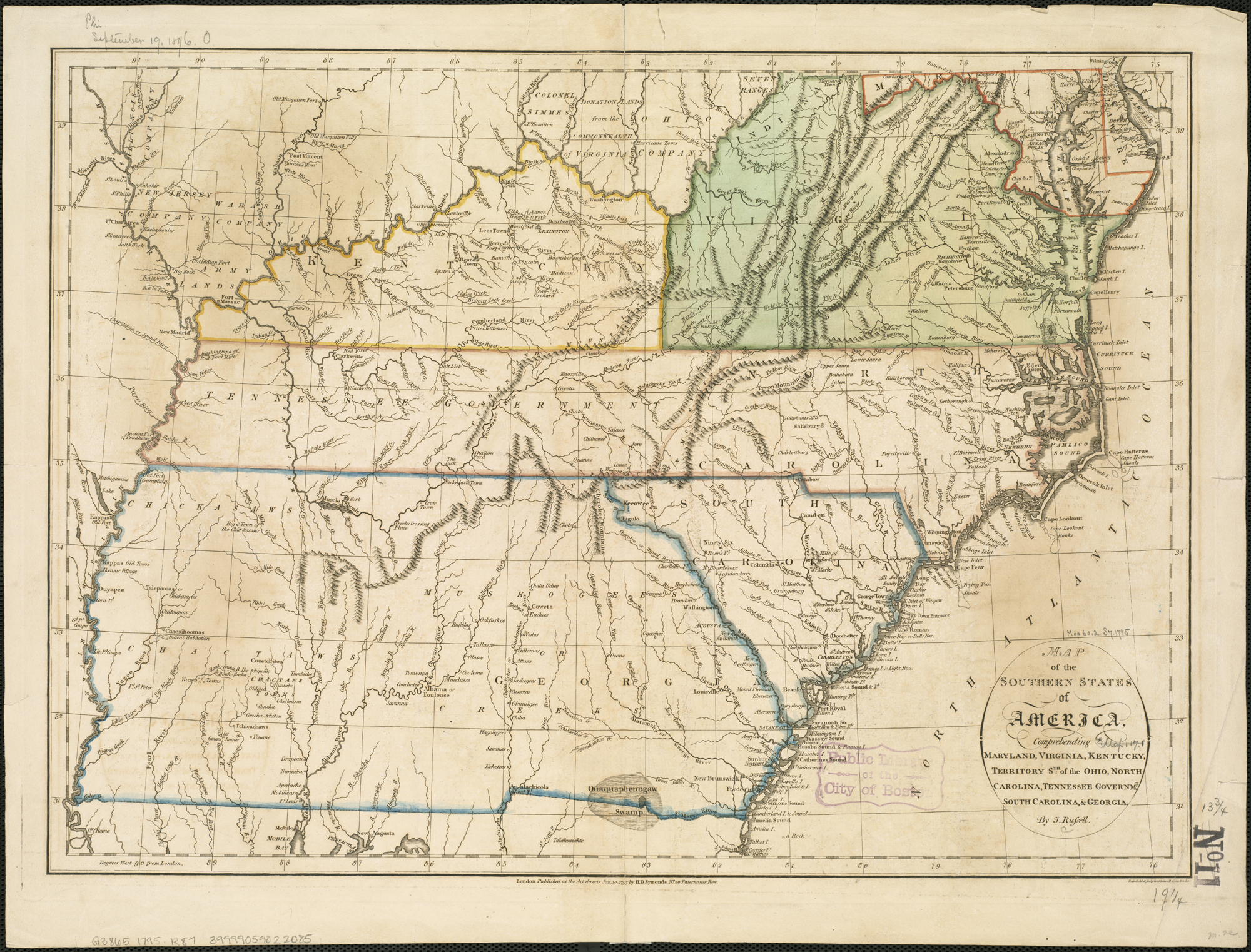
1795 Russell map of the southeastern United States, showing Indigenous settlements and a fort or blockhouse north of Melton's Bluff on Elk River (Boston Public Library G3865 1795 .R87)

Jackson's first plantation along the Muscle Shoals of the Tennessee River in what is now Alabama, United States was at a location called Melton's Bluff in what is today Lawrence County. Located across from confluence of Elk River and the Tennessee, Melton's Bluff is today "a few miles upstream from Rogersville and north of Wheeler Station." A portion of it lies within what is now known as the General Joe Wheeler Estate, and "its high bluffs are a part of the Tennessee Valley Authority's Wheeler Lake Reservoir properties."

On September 20, 1816, Jackson concluded the Treaty of the Chickasaw Council House, in which the Chickasaw people (Chikashsha) ceded large sections of middle Tennessee and northern Alabama to the U.S. government. The land was at that time considered part of the Mississippi Territory; Alabama Territory would be separated in 1817. Andrew Jackson bought a plantation there "situated at the head of Elk River Shoals on the south bank of the Tennessee". It was "exactly one month and eight days after General Andrew Jackson signed" the treaty that Jackson and his longtime business partner John Hutchings bought Melton's Bluff on November 22, 1816. Jackson called it the Muscle Shoals plantation. The transaction paperwork is preserved in the Jackson papers at the Library of Congress and includes the deed to Melton's Bluff from David Melton, as well as bills of sale from Eliza Melton to Andrew Jackson and his business partner John Hutchings for an enslaved woman named, Jenny, and a bill of sale from Nancy Melton for her farm and an enslaved man named Jame. David Melton is believed have been of at least five children of a Cherokee (Tsalagi, ᏣᎳᎩ) woman and Irishman, John Melton, who settled at the bluff and established a plantation and tavern there. The language of the deed reads:

I David Melton of the Cherokee Nation do by these presents bargain and sell...unto General Andrew Jackson and Captain John Hutchings all my right title and interest to the tract of land where I now live, and agree to give them possession of all the improvements laying north and east of the spring, including said spring, on said tract where I live and adjoining where I live, and the houses and...land southeast of the spring. Possession to be given of as many Negro houses as will house the Negroes of the said Andrew and the said John... and possession of the other houses on or before the first day of February...For which I acknowledge to have received the consideration of sixty dollars in cash and in full of the above sale.

Per the editors of The Papers of Andrew Jackson, Jackson "never obtained more than an Indian title to the Melton's Bluff plantation". (This was illegal although the chances of prosecution were nil; no one was supposed to buy land directly from Indigenous people; it was supposed to be a function of the federal government negotiating with the tribes as sovereign nations, and then the government had the authority to resell it to individuals.)

In June 1817 Andrew Jackson wrote to his wife Rachel Jackson from Huntsville, "I was at the Bluff Two days & nights, Major Hutchings deserves a Meddle—he has the finest Prospect of a good crop I ever saw, his cotton far excells any crop I have seen, & I think we may calculate, on, from Eighty, to Ninety Bales—he will be in, perhaps before I return he has a bad cough, I have urged him to come in & apply proper remedies for it".

Jackson wrote to Coffee from Melton's Bluff in September 1816 reporting much sickness in the vicinity, expressing concern over the health of Hutchings, and asking him to tell Stockley D. Hutchings to send a new overseer. According to travel writer Anne Royall, who spent several days at Melton's Bluff two years later, Jackson "had heard of the sickness of which his overseer had died, and of several of his slaves being confined at the same time.—Mrs. Mitchell, and her husband, (the merchant before mentioned) were lying, not able to rise, one in one bed, and the other opposite in another. She related to me, that the General and his suite would take the water buckets and go to the river for water; heat it over the fire, and take the sick in their arms, and placing their feet in the warm water, would thus support them, until they were sufficiently bathed, and then bear them back to their bed again. After this the General would administer medicine with his own hands. Thus he went the whole night, and never ceased till he had administered the necessary wants to all, both black and white, and consoling them with the most soothing language." Simultaneously Jackson was commanding that the surveyor general for the area bring him specific township and range maps for the region, specifically the ones for the land near Coldwater Creek and Spring Creek.

Hutchings, who was one of dozens of cousins on Jackson's wife's side of the family, and was called "Jackey" by the family, died on November 20, 1817. It is unknown if Hutchings died of the plague that killed the slaves and the overseer, or from a distinct, preexisting illness. An extravagant grave marker was commissioned for Hutchings, which was rediscovered in the 1920s in an overgrown thicket about 20 mi (32 km) northeast of Athens, Alabama.

The travel writer Royall, a devoted admirer of Jackson, spent a few days at Melton's Bluff in January 1818 and described it in letters:

I took a walk with some ladies to-day over the plantation, as we wished to have a nearer view of those snowy fields, which so sedulously present themselves to our view, together with orchards, gin houses, gardens, Melton's mansion, and a considerable negro town. We approached the mansion, by a broad street, running up the river bank east of the town...We entered the court yard, fronting the house, by a stile; and the first thing we met was a large scaffold overspread with cotton: as it was in the seed, their must have been many thousands of pounds. Being damp from dew, and often rain, it must be dried in this manner. The mansion was large, built with logs, shingled roof, and may have been built 25 or 30 years since...General Jackson's overseer, who joined us here, said he lived in the lower story, the upper being filled with cotton. The scaffold was about four feet from the ground. From this we crossed another fence, and found ourselves in a cotton field...On our return home, we passed two lines of negro cabins. There were very few but children in them. We found the cabins warm and comfortable, and well stored with provisions: General Jackson, to whom they belong, being one of the best of masters.

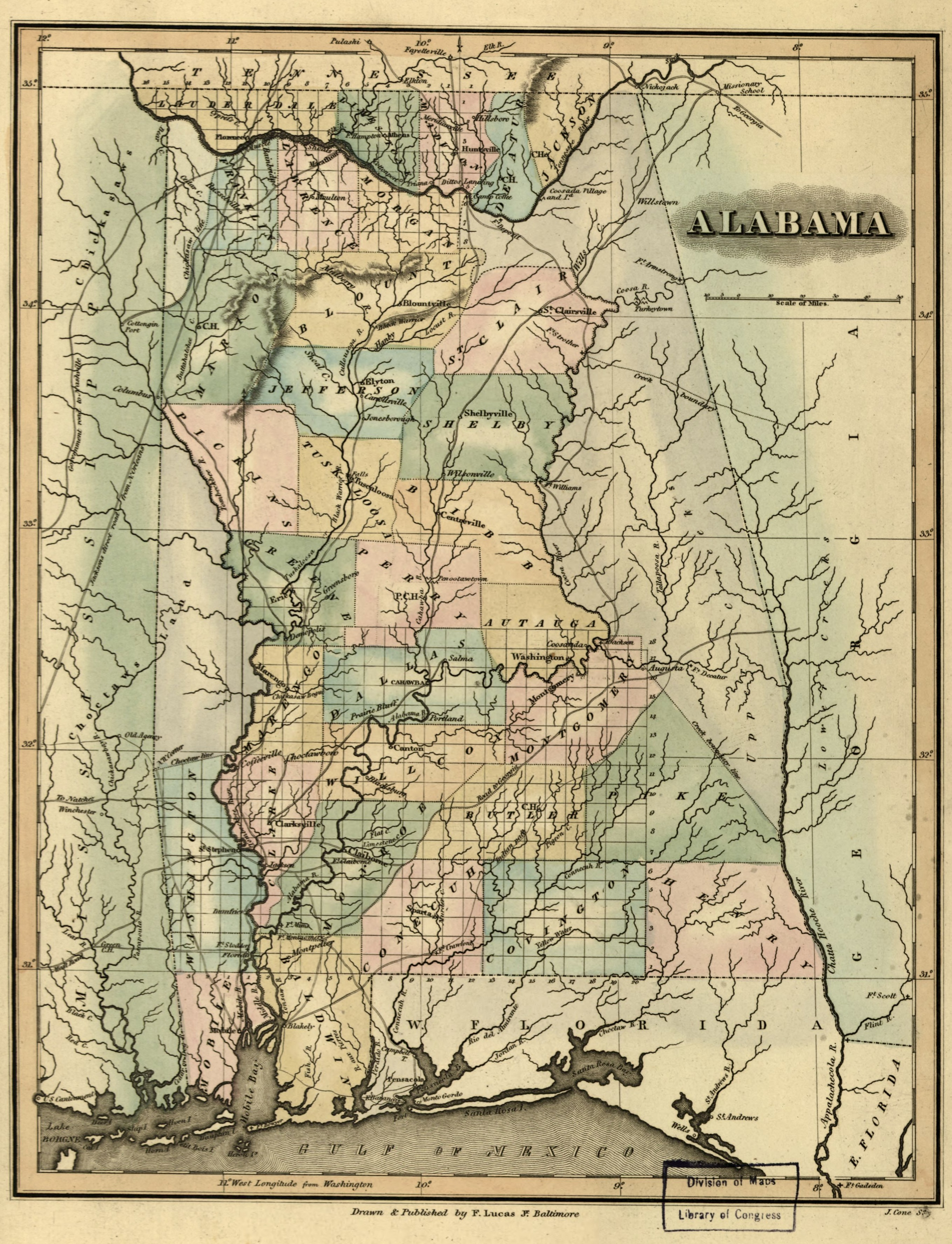
1826 map of Alabama showing Bainbridge, Marathon, and "Jackson's direct road from New Orleans" through Florence, Alabama (LCCN 2006629778)

In November 1818 he wrote to President James Monroe, "On my return from the Chickasaw treaty I found it necessary to pass by Melton's Bluff, where I had established some hands for the culture of cotton, hearing it had been laid out for a town and the lots sold, to have as much of my crop preserved as existing circumstances would permit." (The rest of the letter is consumed with rationalizing Jackson's actions in the First Seminole War of March and April 1818, a dispute that would devolve over time into the long-running "Rhea letter" fraud/controversy.)

Jackson sold the remaining fragments of Melton's Bluff land in 1827.

== Evans Spring plantation ==
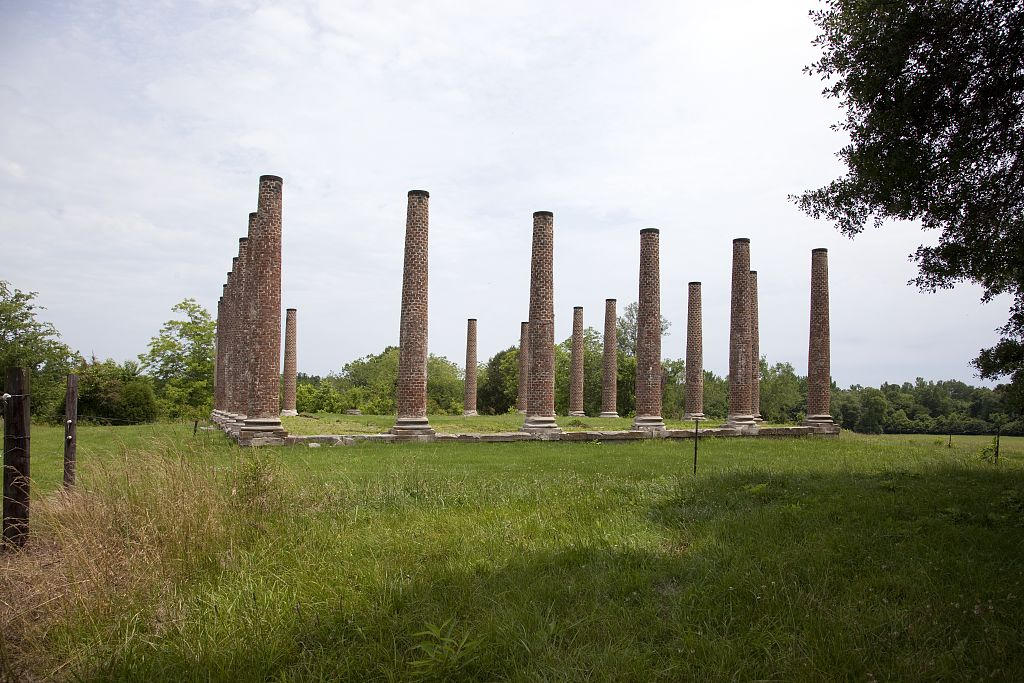
The Forks of Cypress big house was struck by lightning and burned in 1966

In March 1818 Jackson purchased land near Evans' Spring in Lauderdale County, on a site located slightly to the southwest of his friend James Jackson's Forks of Cypress plantation. James Jackson's famous mansion was said to have been built on the spot where Doublehead had once had his home. Jackson then moved "his operation" (presumably his stock of enslaved laborers) from Melton's Bluff to the Evans Spring property. In January 1819 he wrote John Coffee asking him to "Can I ask you when you reach Florence & a leisure day will permit, to lay out my plantation near Florence for me—bring it as near the site for the dwelling house as you think right...Shew him the place where to make little Andrew J. Hutchings plantation &c &c &c" Jackson had hired William White Crawford, son of his cousin James Crawford Jr., to oversee both of the Muscle Shoals properties. Crawford was the overseer at Evans Spring in both 1819 and 1820.

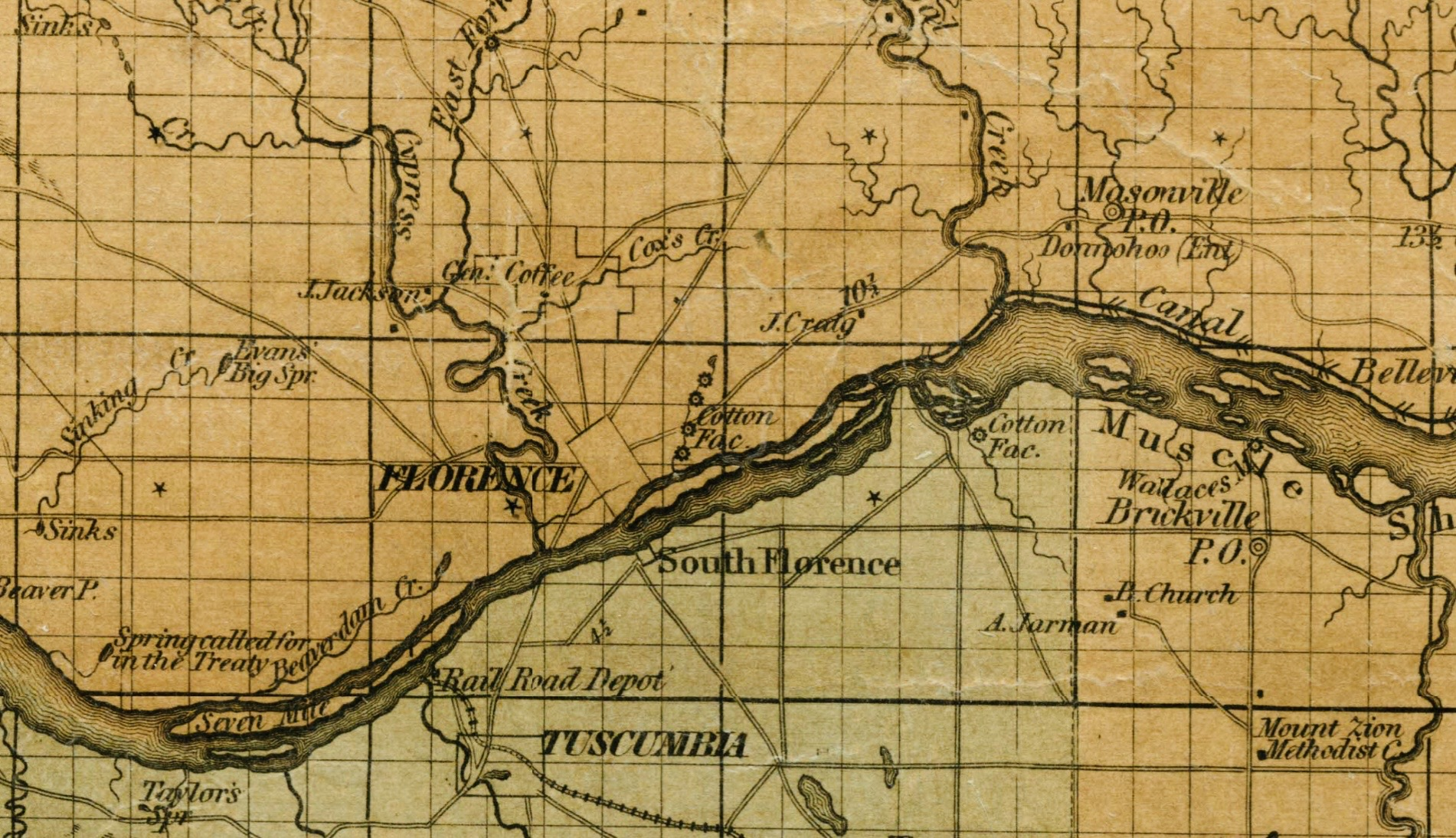
Left to right: Evans Spring, J. Jackson's plantation, Gen. Coffee's plantation (Alabama State Archives CA-0055)

The Evans Spring property was located near land owned by his ward A. J. Hutchings, the orphaned son of John Hutchings. It was the Evans Springs property "that James G. Birney proposed to work jointly with Jackson in 1821. This estate proved to be a burden to Jackson. His Negroes ran away; he was unable to secure good overseers; and the land was unproductive. In 1822 he sold that part of the farm that had improvements and not long afterward sold the remainder of the lands."

Jackson's longtime friend, James Jackson, wrote to the Old Hero on May 28, 1821, that:

The Genl. [Coffee] & myself have agreed on terms with Genl. [John] Brahan for your Plantation, which are contingent, on his shorty being able to arrange for the payments. The Genl. goes shortly to Huntsville when the matter will be finaly understood, the Terms are much below what we in tended to take, but after maturely considering your views & great anxiaty to get clear of any obligations to pay money, We concluded it would be more satisfactory to you. In addition there seems a general disposition not to pay for Lands bought at high prices. In consequence, Certificates can be bought for one half payable in Tennessee money—The bargain with Genl. Brahan is Cost & one thousand dollars for improvements, the Gin re served, one third on takeing possession the balance in one & two years thereafter in good money. In this transaction have looked as much to your feelings as your interest.

Brahan was another veteran of the Creek War who had known Jackson and Coffee for some time but this transaction apparently never came to pass, perhaps because right around the same time, Brahan, the receiver of public monies at the Huntsville, Alabama branch of the United States General Land Office, was found to be short $80,000 in the U.S. government till. The economic uncertainty engendered by the Panic of 1819 also seemingly forestalled a sale for some time. Moving on from Brahan, Coffee and J. Jackson sold the Evans Springs property to Richard C. Cross for US$7,500 (equivalent to $181,406 in 2025) on September 20, 1821.

== Big Spring plantation ==
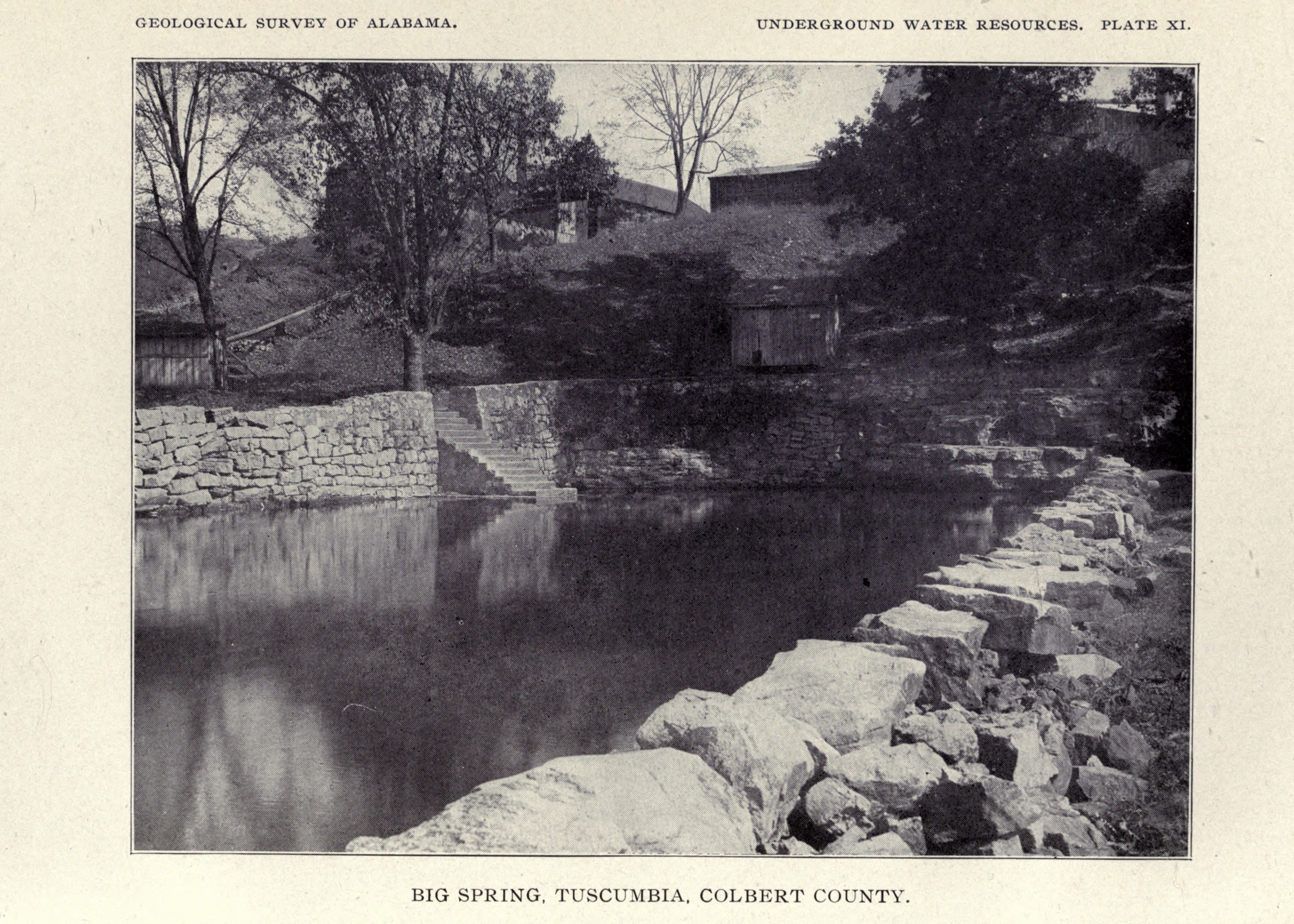
Big Spring, Tuscumbia, Colbert County, Alabama (Geological Survey of Alabama, 1907)

On November 5, 1818, and in 1821 Jackson bought land in what was then Franklin County (Colbert County since 1867), near a noted water source known as Big Spring, one of several such Alabama "big springs" emerging from the region's underlying chert and limestone rocks, the water of which is "which generally more or less highly charged with carbonate of lime and carbonate of magnesia." Jackson paid US$2 (equivalent to $48.38 in 2025) an acre, which he later claimed to Isaac Shelby was a price for which "a numerous & mixed multitude" had loudly cheered.

According to Turner Rice, a retired banker and local historian of Birmingham, Alabama:

If you will superimpose Section 33 of the third township, on a large scale map of present day Colbert County, you will see that Jackson's purchase runs down 2nd Street in Sheffield, for its northern boundary, and to the Tuscumbia city limits, just back of the Colbert County Hospital, on the South. Montgomery Avenue pretty well splits it down the middle. In 1821 Jackson acquired 578.57 acres of Section 32 which lies in Colbert County, immediately adjacent to Section 33, to the west, and including the south bank of the river at Spring Creek. This land lies squarely between General Coffee's pet town-to-be York's Bluff on the north, and Coldwater, later Tuscumbia, on the south. These two sections would appear to be the best speculation of the lot, but results were a long time coming.

Jackson was in Florence between November 19 and 26, 1821, moving his property (enslaved people and stock animals) from the Evans Spring plantation to Big Spring, which was shortly to become a settlement called Tuscumbia, Alabama. He hired Stephen Sharrock as overseer. The next year he hired Egbert Harris as overseer in March and discharged him in November. Jackson was in Alabama in March 1822 "when the Cumberland and Tennessee Rivers were at flood stage which allowed his cotton boats to commence their journeys to New Orleans"; and again in June 1822, when "General Jackson rode his horse from Nashville to Alabama to inspect his plantation."

The last overseer of Big Spring was Benjamin J. Person, "who had served in Coffee's brigade during the War of 1812", and when the Big Spring plantation was sold "Person supervised the resettlement of Jackson's slaves to the Hermitage, where he remained as overseer until late 1826." Jackson's attempt to set up as a farmer of Alabama on the Big Spring property was "almost disastrous". Jackson claimed that all his overseers were "villains" who "deceived him greviously".

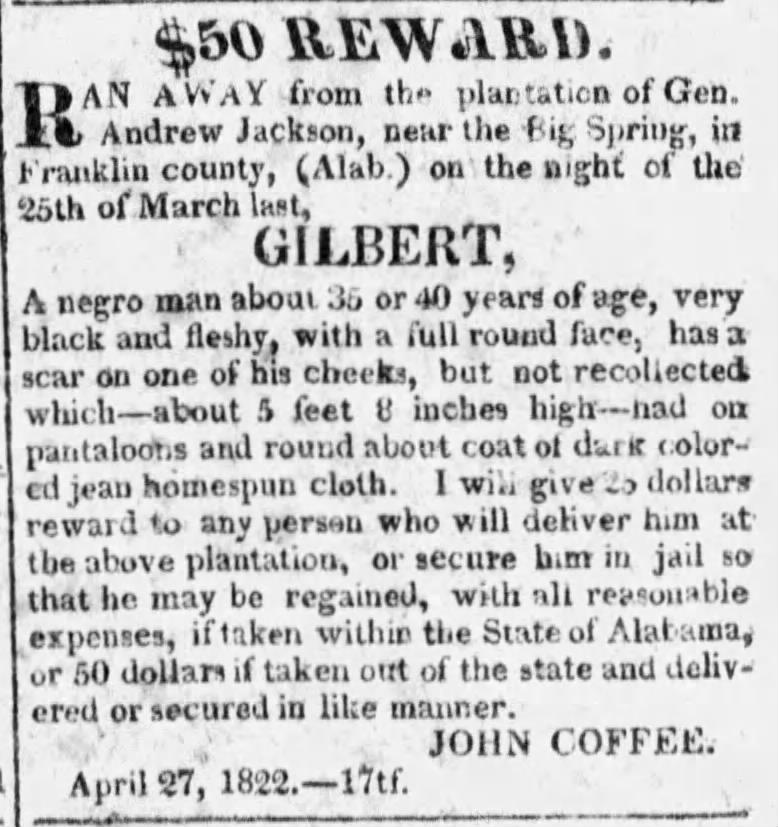
Gilbert escaped from Big Spring "on the night of the 25th of March" 1822 (Mississippi State Gazette, Natchez, Mississippi)

In October 1822, Andrew Jackson wrote to his ward/nephew/protégé A. J. Donelson that he had an offer on the Big Spring place but he said he did not accept it because it would be a sacrifice to sell it "for a less sum than I knew it was really worth—and from its situation it must be come very Valuable—I therefore declined for the present—& have deter mined to make another effort to make it productive—it has hitherto been a source of expence, & great trouble". On November 22, 1822, Andrew Jackson accepted an offer from Anthony Winston Jr. for the "improved half" of the Big Spring farm, and closed his account with William Henry Wharton "for medical attention to slaves on Big Spring farm". He sold it "on time" (to be paid in installments with interest due on the amount remaining) for the purchase price "plus $1,000 for improvements he had put on the property".

The Winstons originally lived in the same Davidson County, Tennessee "neighborhood" as the Donelson family. Anthony Winston had "four of his sons and two of his sons-in-law" who "served in the Creek Indian war under Gen. Andrew Jackson." Winston Jr. served in the Alabama state legislature representing Franklin county in 1819 and 1822. Winston may have paid for the land with enslaved people, at least in part. Jackson wrote to John Coffee in January 1823 about a bill for ferriage: "...please pay to him out of the mony you may receive from Colo. Antony Winston. The Colo. writes me by Mr Crawford 'that he will meet the payment for the land agreable to contract, which he will with the negroes pay over to you; They cattle, pork, corn, he must give his note bearing interest as he has been much disappointed'." Winston later bought the other half of the property; Jackson wanted him to "give US$12 (equivalent to $322.5 in 2025) pr acre in silver or u states notes" for the 320 acres, and Winston reported in 1828 that he had paid US$6,976 (equivalent to $187,480 in 2025) for Big Spring.

== Marathon, Bainbridge, Florence, York's Bluff: Jackson and the development of Alabama ==
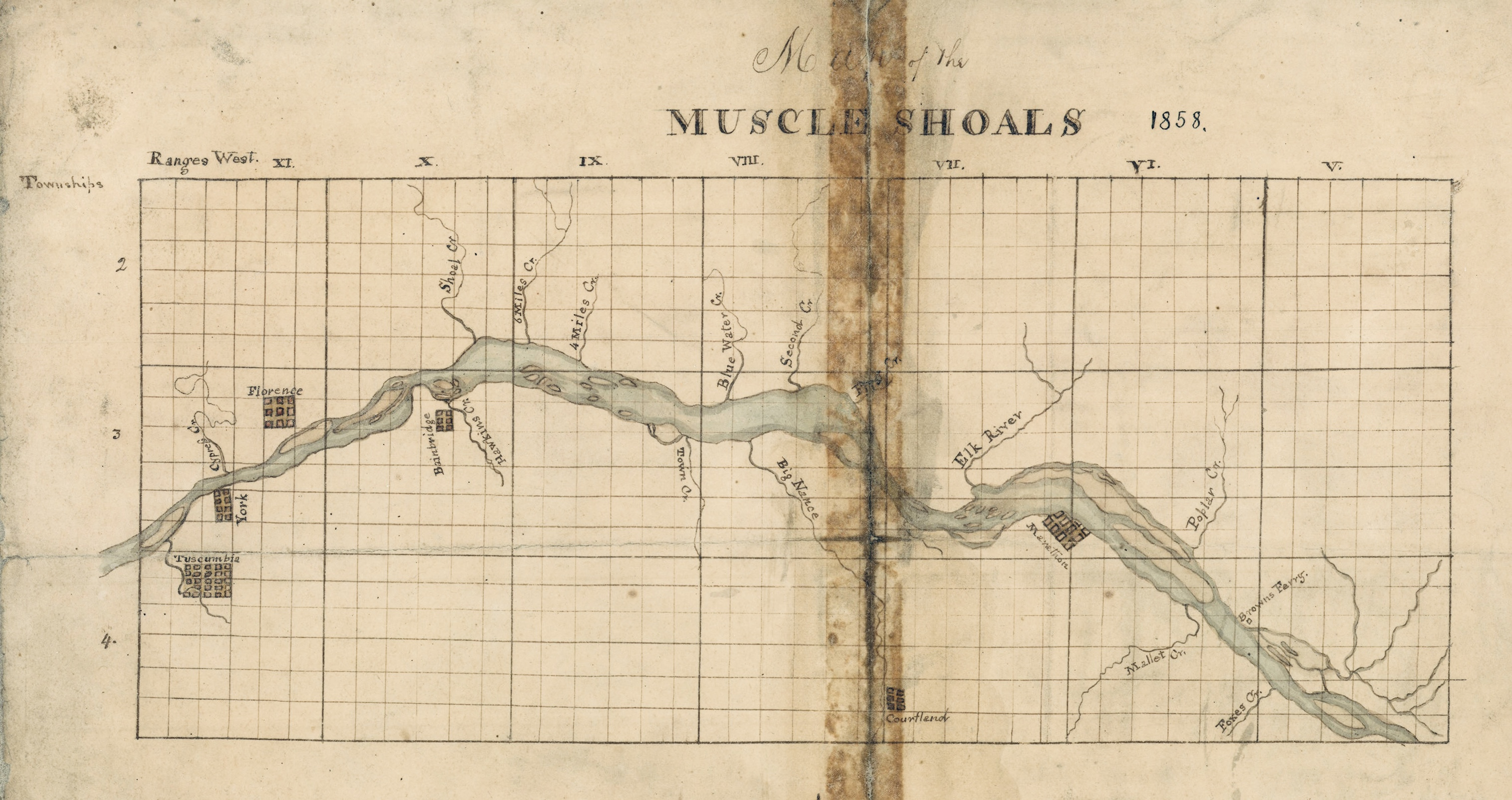
This hand-colored map of the Muscle Shoals section of the Tennessee River has been in the Tennessee State Library and Archives since 1858; it shows Florence, Courtland, and Tuscumbia as well as the planned but unrealized towns of York, Bainbridge, and Marathon, Alabama (TVA 42391)

Jackson had long been interested in the agricultural and economic prospects of Alabama. Isaac L. Baker, a captain during the War of 1812, recorded his observations of Jackson in his journal shortly before the capture of Mobile:

On the voyage I was much pleased with general Jackson. He is certainly one of the most accessible men in the world and I do not believe that he has a fault which does not spring from warmth of his heart. He took great interest in observing the soil situation etc of the country adjacent to the Alabama, and why should he not. It was him who by his indefatigable exertions secured this territory to the Union. His information is extensive and for a man who still retains so much so much of the philanthropy of youth his acquaintance with mankind correct and extensive. There is none of that phlegmatic dross in his composition which so often envelopes some great strong minds and renders them difficult to be roused. He is temperate Industrious and liberal and inclined naturally to be courteous to every man without respect to grade or condition.

The Cotton Gin Treaty of 1805–06 with the Cherokee, signed at Washington, D.C., had set aside two special reserves of land at the Muscle Shoals, one on the south side of the Tennessee River called Doublehead's land, and another six square miles north of the river beginning at Spring Creek reserved to co-owners Moses Melton (believed to be another son of John Melton and his Cherokee wife), and Charles Hicks. In 1816 a letter to president James Monroe suggested federal forces would be used to remove Indigenous residents named Melton and Hicks from the property. Andrew Jackson, as a major general of the Southern Division of the United States Army, was among those responsible for the removal. He wrote George Washington Campbell on December 22, 1816, that he had received "the order for the removal of all intruders from the land ceded by the Chickasaws lying north of the T....I am anxious before I enter upon the execution of the order to be advised, whether the tenants of [Charles] Hicks & [David and Betsy] Melton are to be removed from that reservation, and I hope you have ere this recd. my letter on that subject and has obtained the Presidents instruction for me thereon." According to the editors of The Papers of Andrew Jackson, on December 28, "[George] Graham directed that the Melton-Hicks reservees retained only an 'Indian title' and ordered removal of 'all persons found upon those reservations in contravention of the right of the United States, whether with or without the consent of the reservees'." Cherokee title to Melton's and Doublehead's reserves was extinguished on July 8, 1817, by the Jackson–McMinn Treaty. These reserves along the Tennessee River would shortly become the site of towns, such as Florence, Alabama, that were largely organized by long-time business associates of Jackson, such as James Jackson.

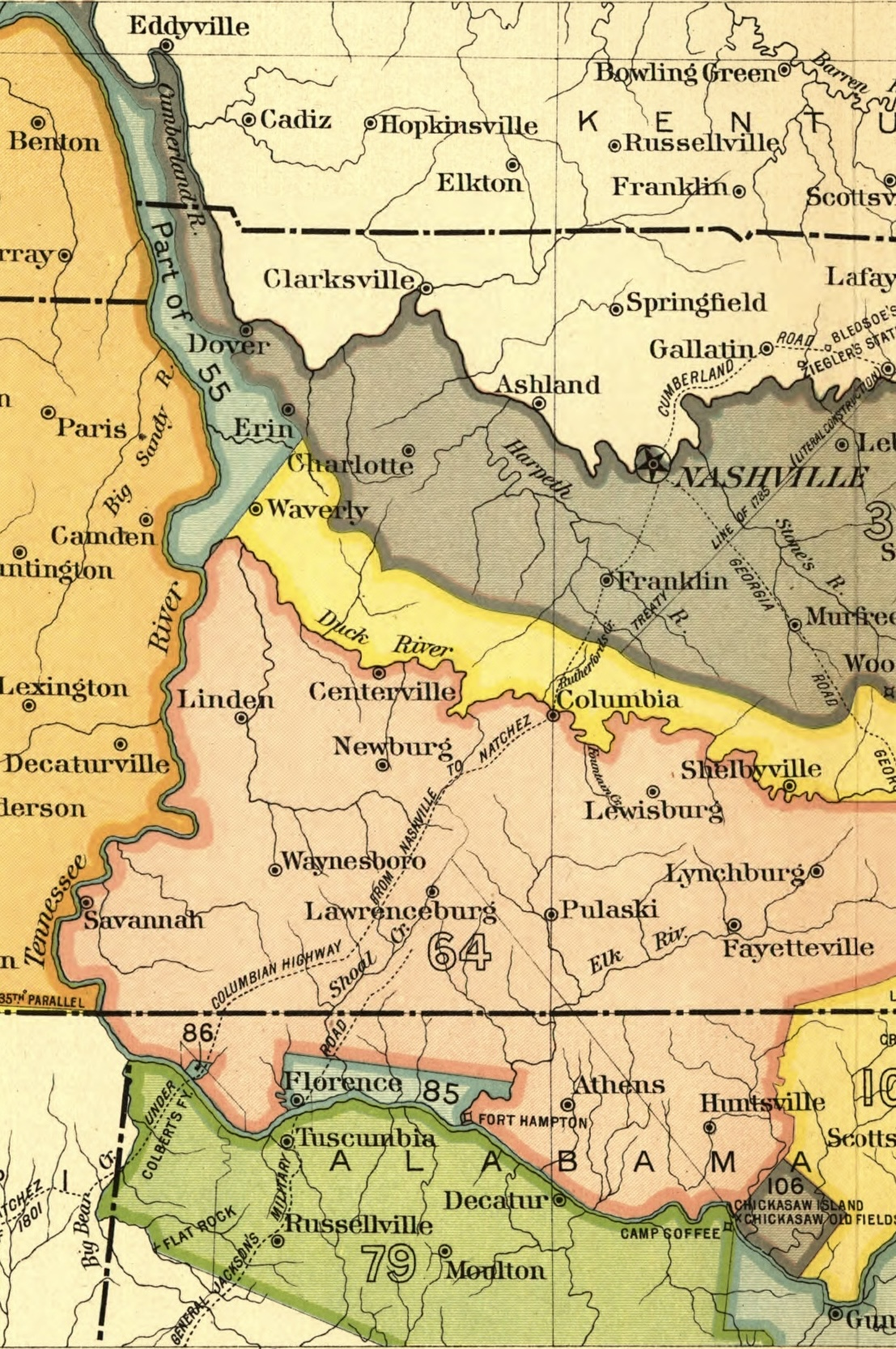
Cherokee title to area 85 was extinguished under the Jackson-McMinn treaty in 1817 (Indian Land Cessions, 1898)

The opening of the Muscle Shoals to White settlement was an eager time for Jackson. According to historian Gordon T. Chappell, "Among those particularly interested in the land of this area was Andrew Jackson, who at the time was engaged in laying out plans for a military road through that part of the region near the present site of Florence, Alabama. He and the surveyor general were scheduled to meet on May 25, 1817, 'to make a small view of the country'. Jackson's interest was so whetted by the fine land of the Tennessee Valley that he consulted the surveyor general on several occasions regarding the choice sites". In August 1817 Jackson wrote John Coffee about prospects for developing and marketing a new town in the newly ceded land. To Jackson's eye, "Double heads place on the north side, the head of the shoals, or Meltons Bluff on the south, with the site below the mouth of Flint on the south side are the only places, that I could suppose would be proper sites for Towns, and some of those only, that ever can be expected to grow into any beneficial size".

On October 12, 1818, Andrew Jackson purchased three lots in the proposed town of Marathon, Alabama, which was to be built on his Melton's Bluff land, including a gin lot, "paying $250 in scrip and $28.75 in cash". Marathon was "the seat of justice" for Lawrence County during the Alabama Territory era (from 1817 to 1819), but "became a ghost town when the county seat was moved to Moulton in 1820."

Like nearby Bainbridge, Alabama, which was a townlet promoted by his nephew Captain Jack Donelson, Marathon came to little. The United States Congress provided for a mail route to hamlets in the area on May 13, 1820, from Mooresville "by Melton's Bluff, Courtland, Bainbridge, and Big Spring to Russellville. Alas! Melton's Bluff and Bainbridge were 'mushroom' towns and Big Spring soon became Tuscumbia to honor the Chickasaw warrior, Tashka ambi. Melton's Bluff site lost the main mail route in less than two years for after May 8, 1822, the post rider went by Triana, Mooresville, Athens, East-port, Bainbridge and to the Big Spring".

Jackson and Coffee were also involved in developing the trading-post settlement of York's Bluff, which languished for decades but eventually re-emerged to posterity in the 1880s as Sheffield, Alabama.

== See also ==
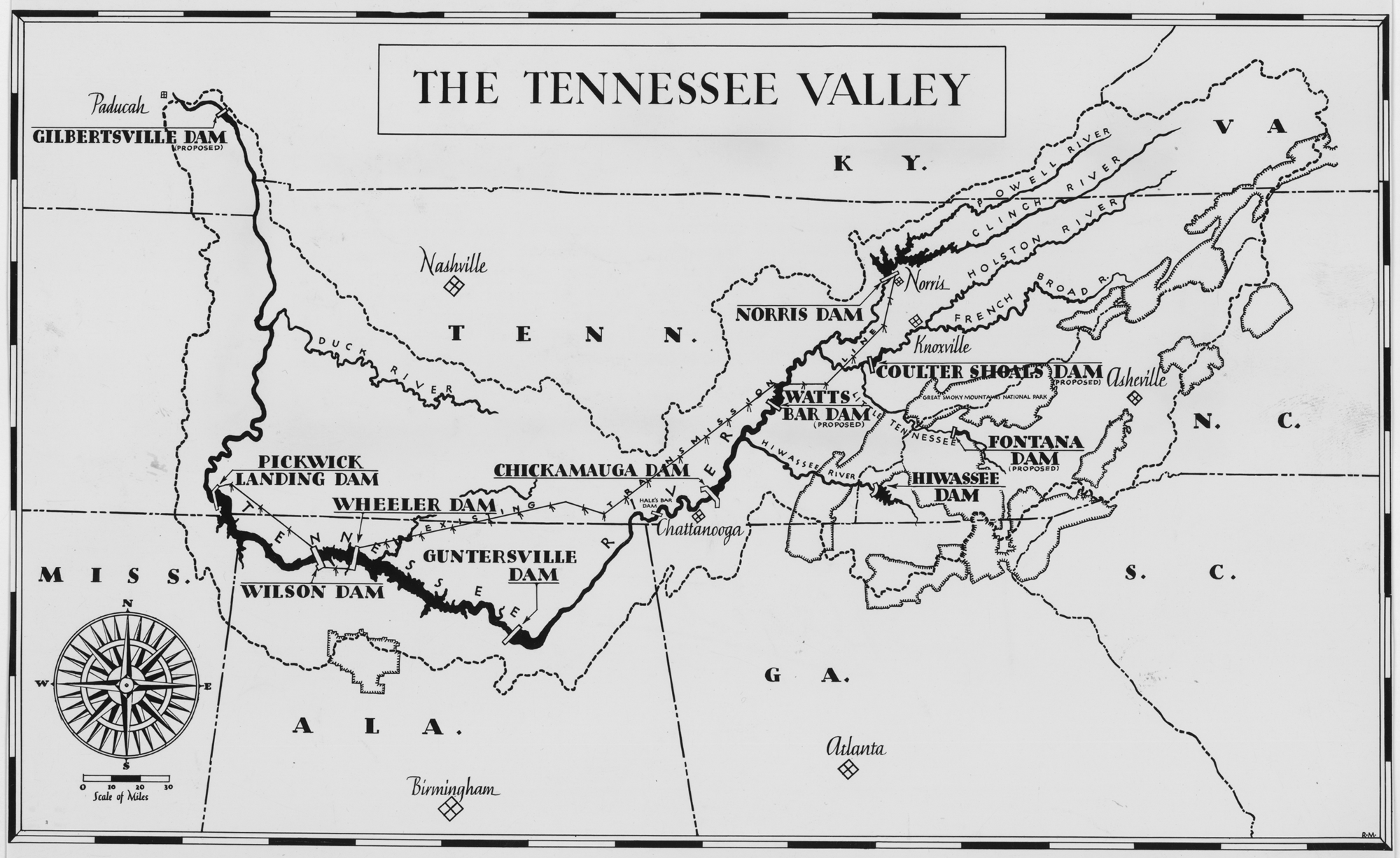
The Tennessee Valley Authority projects of the New Deal era reshaped the river; Bainbridge, for instance, now lies under the Wilson Dam reservoir

- Bibliography of Andrew Jackson
- Andrew Jackson and the slave trade
- Plantations of Andrew Jackson
- Stockley D. Hays
- Wards of Andrew Jackson
- Malcolm Gilchrist (speculator)
- Benjamin Sherrod
- Alabama real estate bubble of the 1810s
- Joseph Wheeler plantation
- Joe Wheeler State Park

== Sources ==
- "Muscle Shoals National Heritage Area Interpretive Plan". nps.gov. January 15, 2013.
- Agee, Phil (September 2022). Debt-Driven Settlerism: Small Farmers and Bankers in the Trans-Appalachian South, 1800–1820 (M.A. Liberal Studies). City University of New York (CUNY) Graduate Center.
- Carter, Clarence Edwin, ed. (1952). The Territorial Papers of the United States. Vol. 18 (Alabama Territory, 1817–1819). U.S. Govt. Print. Off., for sale by Supt. of Docs. NARA Pub. No. 52-11 – via HathiTrust.
- Chappell, Gordon T. (November 1949). "Some Patterns of Land Speculation in the Old Southwest". The Journal of Southern History. 15 (4): 463–477. doi:10.2307/2198383. JSTOR 2198383.
- Cheathem, Mark R. (2013). Andrew Jackson, Southerner. Baton Rouge, Louisiana: Louisiana State University Press. ISBN 978-0-8071-5099-3. LCCN 2012049695. OCLC 858995561. Project MUSE book 26506.
- Marks, Henry (April 1973). "Andrew Jackson's Activities in the Tennessee Valley". Huntsville Historical Review. 3 (2) 4: 27–36 – via M. Louis Salmon Library, University of Alabama at Huntsville.
- McDonald, William Lindsey (1995). "Melton's Bluff: Andrew Jackson's Cotton Plantation at the Muscle Shoals". Essays on the History of the Shoals from Pioneer Days to World War II. The Journal of Muscle Shoals History. 14. Sheffield, Alabama: Tennessee Valley Historical Society: 3–18. ISSN 0094-8039. OCLC 1795446.
- Rice, Turner (1975a). "Andrew Jackson and His Northwest Alabama Interests". Journal of Muscle Shoals History. 3. University of North Alabama. Florence, Alabama: Tennessee Valley Historical Society: 3–12. ISSN 0094-8039. LCCN 74646773. OCLC 1795446.
- Royall, Anne Newport (1969). Griffith, Lucille (ed.). Letters from Alabama, 1817–1822. Southern Historical Publications No. 14. University of Alabama Press. ISBN 0817352198. LCCN 70076584. OCLC 13688. OL 7303383W.
- Serme, Jean-Marc (December 2003). "Stormy Weather at Andrew Jackson's Halcyon Plantation, in Coahoma County, Mississippi, 1838–1845". Revue française d'études américaines (98): 32–47. doi:10.3917/rfea.098.0032. ISSN 0397-7870. JSTOR 20874927.
- Smith, Eugene A.; Chaffee, Frank P. (1907). The underground water resources of Alabama. Geological Survey of Alabama Monograph No. 6. U.S. Geological Survey. Montgomery, Alabama: Brown Printing Co., State Printers and Binders. LCCN gs07000817. OCLC 2783256. OL 7182272M.
- Various; Jackson, Andrew (1994). Moser, Harold D.; Hoth, David R.; Hoemann, George H. (eds.). The Papers of Andrew Jackson: Volume IV, 1816–1820. University of Tennessee Press. doi:10.7290/utp8684. ISBN 978-0-8704-9219-8.
- ———; ——— (1996). ———; ———; ——— (eds.). The Papers of Andrew Jackson: Volume V, 1821–1824. University of Tennessee Press. doi:10.7290/utp7345. ISBN 978-0-87049-897-8.
- Walker, Arda (1943). "Andrew Jackson; Planter". The East Tennessee Historical Society's Publications. 15: 19–34. ISSN 0361-6193. LCCN 29013045. OCLC 39989616. FHL 1345525.
- Works Progress Administration (1941). Alabama: A Guide to the Deep South. American Guide Series. Alabama State Planning Commission. New York: Hastings House. LCCN 41052528. OCLC 38502028.
