= Cotton Gin Treaty =

1805 & 1806 U.S.–Cherokee treaties

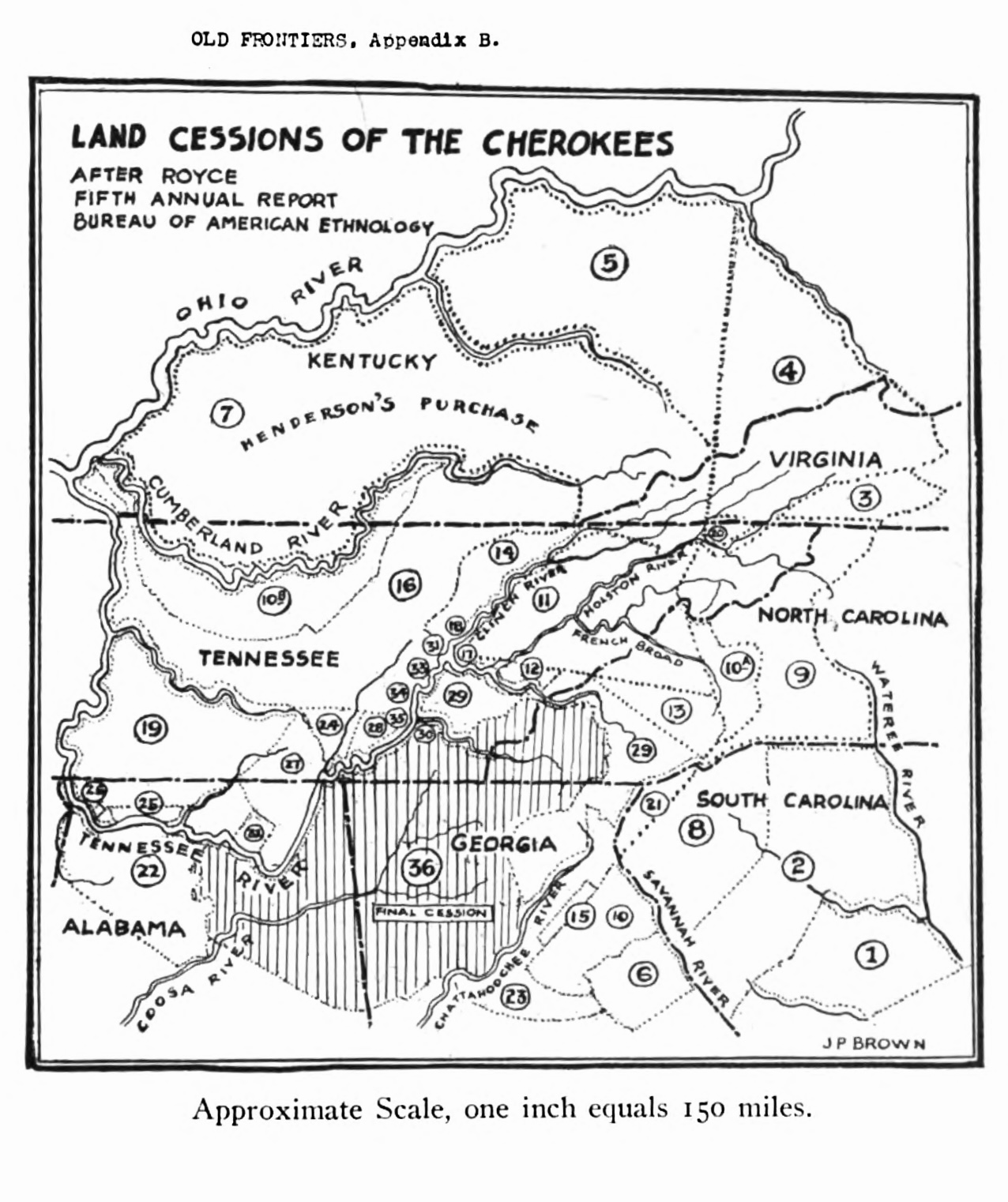
- Name: Treaty of Tellico (1805a)
- Alt or common: Cotton Gin Treaty
- Linked parts: 1 of 4
- Tribe, as named: Cherokee
- Nations: Cherokee Nation (Oklahoma); Eastern Band of Cherokee Indians (North Carolina); United Keetoowah Band of Cherokee Indians (Oklahoma)
- Endonym: ᏣᎳᎩ (Tsalagi)
- Tribal representatives: Pathkiller; The Glass; Doublehead; John Jolly; John McLemore
- US representatives: Return J. Meigs; Daniel Smith
- Witnesses: Robert Purdy; William L. Lovely
- Interpreters: Charles Hicks
- Signed: October 25, 1805
- Proclaimed: April 24, 1806
- Senate ratified: ?
- Statutes: 7 Stat. 93
- Ratified treaty: 37
- Cession map(s): 57 (ArcGIS layers)
- Royce plate(s): Pl. CLXI: Tennessee and Portions of Bordering States (Plate 161)
- Map links: hdl:loc.gmd/g3701em.gct00002 (54 of 67)
- Superseding: Jackson–McMinn Treaty

- Name: Treaty of Tellico (1805b)
- Linked parts: 2 of 4
- Tribal representatives: Black Fox; The Glass; Toochalar; Turtle at Home; Doublehead
- Signed: October 27, 1805
- Proclaimed: June 10, 1806
- Senate ratified: ?
- Statutes: 7 Stat. 95
- Ratified treaty: 38
- Cession map(s): 58 59 (ArcGIS layers)

- Name: Convention with the Cherokee
- Alt or common: Treaty of Washington, Cotton Gin Treaty
- Linked parts: 3 of 4
- Tribal representatives: Doublehead; James Vann
- US representatives: Henry Dearborn
- Witnesses: Return J. Meigs Sr.; Benjamin Hawkins; Daniel Smith
- Interpreters: Charles Hicks
- Signed: January 7, 1806
- Proclaimed: May 23, 1807
- Senate ratified: May 22, 1807
- Statutes: 7 Stat. 101
- Ratified treaty: 42 and/or 53 (?)
- Cession map(s): 64 (ArcGIS layers)

The Convention with the Cherokee, also known as the Treaty of Washington, or Treaty of Tellico, and informally, the Cotton Gin Treaty, was a deal between Cherokee (Tsalagi, ᏣᎳᎩ) tribal leadership and the United States government, documented in five agreements over four months. The first negotiations took place at Tellico (Knoxville, Tennessee) and were signed October 25, and October 27, 1805. The first agreement ceded land in exchange for payment in cash and farm tools, and permitted free access of certain roads, and is thus sometimes called the Treaty for Cession of Land and Road Privileges. This agreement also "authorized a Mail Road" through Cherokee land that connected Knoxville to the Natchez Trace. The second part was concluded January 7, 1806 in the national capital, Washington, D.C. Key signatories on the Cherokee side were Doublehead and James Vann; key negotiators on the American side were Indian agent Return J. Meigs and Tennessee surveyor and U.S. senator Daniel Smith.

The land ceded included locations in Kentucky, and Middle Tennessee north of the Tennessee River, Southwest Point, First Island in the Tennessee River "above the Mouth of Clinch", a tract in Tennessee between the Tennessee and Duck Rivers, and Long Island of Holston River, also known as the Beloved Treaty Ground.

The treaty was a morass of bribery and long-con chicanery under the aegis of the state, which was not uncommon; in the words of one county historian regarding this treaty and similar, "It placed the United States in an attitude of reserving what was the property of others. Numerous peculiar and inconsistent things were done, however, while the settlement of East Tennessee was in progress."

== History ==
Doublehead was a brutal war chief during the Cherokee–American wars of the 1780s and 1790s who had settled into maturity as the principal chief in the vicinity of the Muscle Shoals along the Tennessee River in what is now the northern reaches of the U.S. state of Alabama. He had become a businessman, developing a 100 mi (160 km) wagon road from Tennessee. Aided by a Cherokee language-English language-bilingual Scottish-American trader named James Chisholm, he requested a boat from the U.S. government to carry the Cherokee nation's agricultural products in New Orleans. Doublehead's town was on the south side of the Shoals but his house was on the north side. As of 1804, Doublehead's village had 121 Cherokee residents and about 15 Whites.

The Cherokees agreed to negotiate in part because they hoped to forestall more White settlements in Georgia, and because Indian agents Meigs and Smith were insistent. Secretary of War Henry Dearborn "gave secret instructions to the commissioners to negotiate only with Doublehead, since he could be bribed."

Longtime U.S. Indian agent Return J. Meigs and surveyor, U.S. senator and Andrew Jackson in-law Daniel Smith "employed the standard technique of bribery as a method of working out two new treaties with the Cherokees. Doublehead and Tahlonteeskee [Common Disturber] were promised choice tracts of land [in exchange] for help in persuading the other chiefs to approve land cessions. Still other secret awards were issued when a delegation comprising Doublehead, [James Vann], Tahlonteeskee, and 14 others was escorted to Washington, D.C., in late December for consummation of still another treaty and a visit with President Jefferson."

Vann got the federal road from Augusta to Nashville routed past his trading post. The Washington treaty included language that granted preferred tracts of land at Muscle Shoals to five people. The first reserve was "bounded southerly on the said Tennessee river, at a place called the Muscle Shoals, westerly by a creek called Te Kee, ta, no-eh or Cyprus creek [Cypress Creek] and easterly by Chu, wa, lee, or Elk river or creek, and northerly by a line to be drawn from a point on said Elk river ten miles on a direct line from its mouth or junction with Tennessee river, to a point on the said Cyprus creek, ten miles on a direct line from its junction with the Tennessee river." This land was to be shared in common by "John D. Chesholm, Au, tow, we, and Cheh Chuhz," also known as Sequechu (Big Half Breed), who was Doublehead's brother. This was called Doublehead's land. Doublehead's reserve included "much of present-day Lauderdale County".

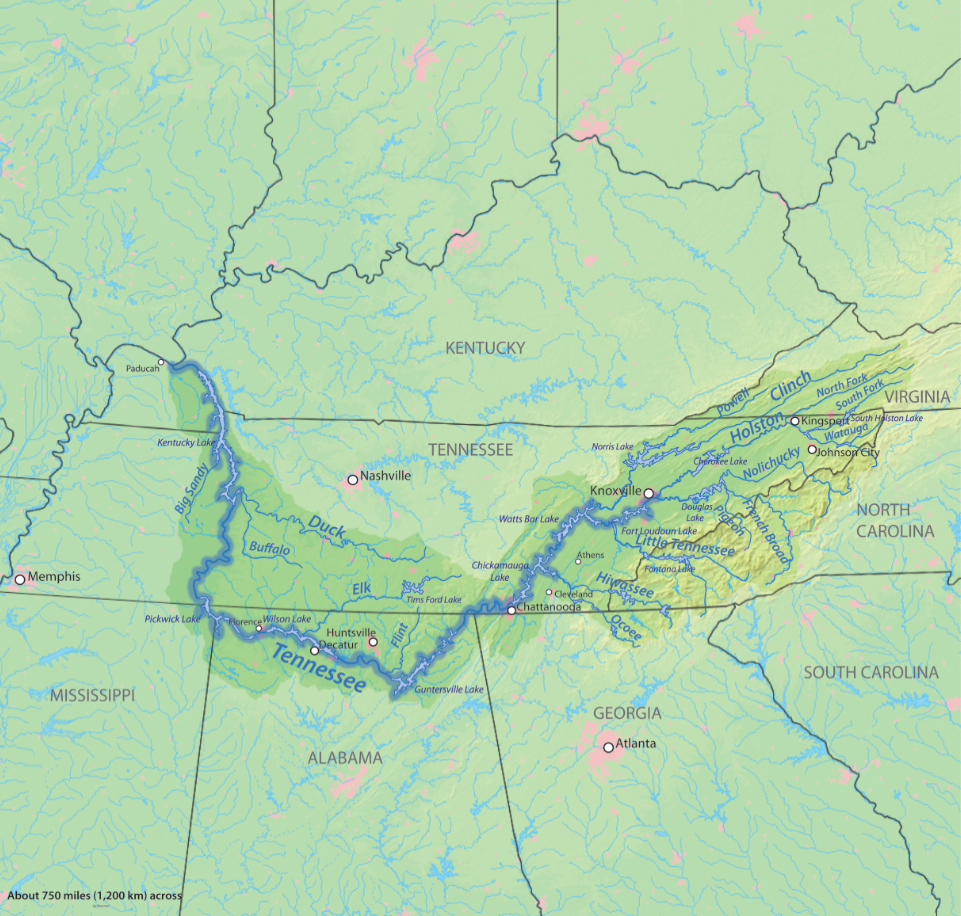
Clinch, Holston, and Duck are all tributaries of the Tennessee

The other tract was described as "two miles in width on the north side of Tennessee river, and to extend northerly from that river three miles, and bounded as follows, viz. beginning at the mouth of Spring Creek, and running up said creek three miles on a straight line, thence westerly two miles at right angles with the general course of said creek, thence southerly on a line parallel with the general course of said creek to the Tennessee river, thence up said river by its waters to the beginning." This land was "on which Moses Melton now lives" to be titled equally to both Melton and Charles Hicks. John Melton and his wife, a sister of Doublehead, had been living at the confluence of the Elk River and the Tennessee since 1780, eventually giving their name to a place called Melton's Bluff. The government also agreed to fund construction of a cotton gin at the Muscle Shoals. Off the books, key Cherokee representatives were also paid $1,000 and two rifles. Chisholm and Doublehead later granted a White man a 10-year lease at Muscle Shoals "for the purpose of building a dam, gristmill, and sawmill". According to the Journal of Muscle Shoals History, "There are indications, especially in the Royall letters, that John Melton was the recipient of this equipment."

The terms of this treaty, and the side deals, were among the motives for the murder of Doublehead at the stickball games and Green Corn Dance event at Hiwassee in August 1807.

Article 10 of the Jackson-McMinn Treaty of 1817 extinguished Cherokee title to Doublehead's and Melton's reserves.

== See also ==
- List of the United States treaties § 1800–1809
- Cherokee treaties
- Timeline of Cherokee history
- The Forks of Cypress
- Andrew Jackson's plantations in northern Alabama
- Timeline of the Thomas Jefferson presidency

== Sources ==
- Berutti, Ronald A. (1992). "The Cherokee Cases: The Fight to Save the Supreme Court and the Cherokee Indians". American Indian Law Review. 17 (1): 291–308. doi:10.2307/20068726.
- Brannon, Peter A. (1950). "Indian Treaties". The Alabama Historical Quarterly. 12. Alabama Department of Archives and History: 242–250.
- Brown, John P. (1938). Old Frontiers: The story of the Cherokee Indians from Earliest Times to the Date of Their Removal to the West, 1838. Kingsport, Tennessee: Southern Publishers, Inc. LCCN 38022941. OCLC 1951086. OL 7027409W.
- Hoig, Stan (1999). The Cherokees and Their Chiefs: In the Wake of Empire. University of Arkansas Press. doi:10.1353/book.124501. ISBN 978-1-61075-096-7.
- McDonald, William Lindsey (1995). "Melton's Bluff: Andrew Jackson's Cotton Plantation at the Muscle Shoals". Essays on the History of the Shoals from Pioneer Days to World War II. The Journal of Muscle Shoals History. 14. Sheffield, Alabama: Tennessee Valley Historical Society: 3–18. ISSN 0094-8039. OCLC 1795446.
- Rice, Turner (1975a). "Andrew Jackson and His Northwest Alabama Interests". Journal of Muscle Shoals History. 3. University of North Alabama. Florence, Alabama: Tennessee Valley Historical Society: 3–12. ISSN 0094-8039. LCCN 74646773. OCLC 1795446.
- Wright, Amos J. (2003). Historic Indian Towns in Alabama, 1540–1838. Introduction by Vernon James. University of Alabama Press. ISBN 978-0-8173-8387-9. LCCN 2003000201. OCLC 772845336. Project MUSE book 22531.
