= York's Bluff, Alabama =

Planned settlement on the Tennessee River

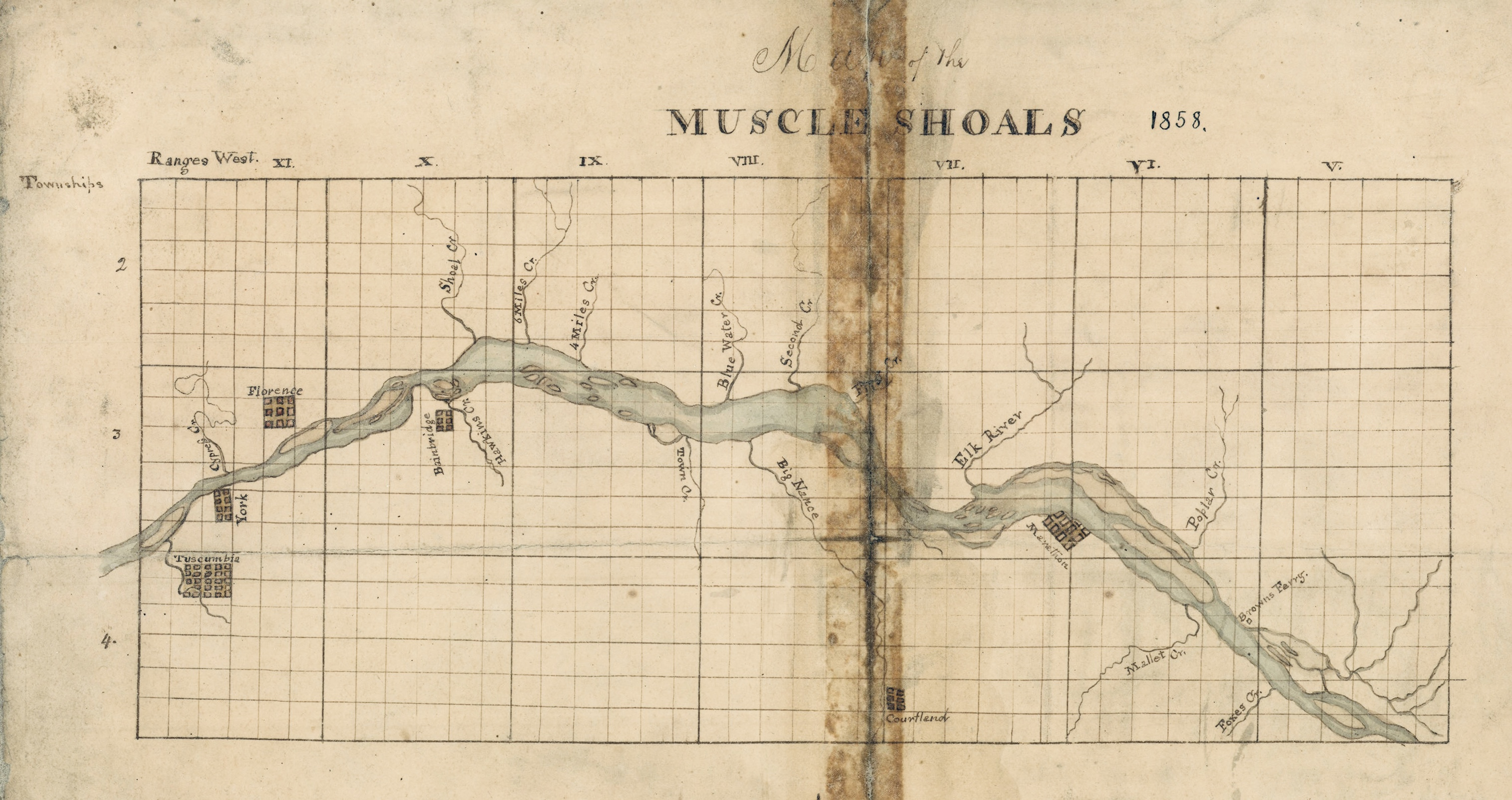
This hand-colored map of the Muscle Shoals section of the Tennessee River has been in the Tennessee State Library and Archives since 1858; it shows the planned but unrealized towns of York, Bainbridge, and Marathon, Alabama (TVA 42391)

York's Bluff, Alabama, also known as York Bluff and simply York, was a planned but never built town along the Tennessee River in what is today Colbert County, Alabama, United States. The land, located on range 11, township 3, section 28, was owned by Andrew Jackson, James Jackson, and John Coffee. When the town of Sheffield, Alabama was planned for the same spot in 1883, city boosters claimed that it was "situated in a lovely spot on the high bluff immediately north of Tuscumbia and two miles from [Talledega]. No more beautiful location could have been found in the south, the river scenery equaling that of the Hudson or the upper Tennessee. It is probably a hundred feet higher than Tuscumbia with a gently undulating plateau extending to that place." York's Bluff was never more than a paper town. As described by the American Guide to Alabama published by the Federal Writers' Project in 1941, Jackson and Coffee "with time heavy on their hands after the defeat of the Creek Confederacy and the British at New Orleans, started the speculative history of the town in 1816 by buying much of the land here. In 1820 General Coffee surveyed and promoted a town called York Bluff. A few houses were built, but the place was soon abandoned in favor of Tuscumbia."

In the 1810s, when it was developed, the planned town of York Bluff "extended from the south boundary of fractional section 28 northward to the Tennessee river, being an average of nearly a mile in length, north and south, and about half a mile in width east and west, and containing an area of 300 acres. The northwest corner of section 28 is cut off by the Tennessee river, leaving an area of 588 acres. Seventy-eight acres was taken off the east side of the section and sold at the land sales and 210 acres off the west side, leaving the town running through the middle of the section its entire length and of uniform width. It appears that the 300 acres was laid off into 195 lots, but as there is no plan of the town in the land office the size of the lots, area of public squares and streets, cannot be ascertained only by reference to the plot of the town at the City of Washington, where it is doubtless preserved." The land was surveyed by Coffee, Jackson's "right-hand man" in matters business and martial. The survey was dated March 6, 1820 and lots were sold for between $3 and $80. Buyers included "Daniel Mosley, James McCartney, the Estills, Rodah Horton and Spencer Ball."

There was no meaningful settlement at the site until Sheffield, Alabama was developed in the 1880s. There may, however, have been a trading post at the spot, because "in 1817, David Keller, the father of the writer of this article, and a gentleman by the name of Miller from Fayetteville, Tenn., brought the first stocks of goods to York Bluff, the present site of Sheffield, that were ever sold in this county. The stock of the former, was hauled by wagons from Philadelphia to Knoxville, and shipped thence on flat boats down the Tennessee." Camp meetings were also held there in early days. The source of the name "York's Bluff" is unknown. According to A. H. Keller, father of notable Alabamian Helen Keller, Jackson's tract was said to be the land "embracing most of that now owned by the Sheffield Land, Iron and Coal Company, and [he] held it for a number of years. After his brilliant victory over Packenham, he grew so rapidly upon the people and the Democratic party, that his dreams of castle building or town booming on the Tennessee, if he ever had any, were dispelled by visions of leadership of a great party and election to the highest office in the government."

== See also ==
- Andrew Jackson's plantations in northern Alabama
- Andrew Jackson and land speculation in the United States

== Sources ==
- Nathan, Joseph H. (1975) [1934]. "Town Building: The Case of Sheffield, Alabama". Journal of Muscle Shoals History. 3. University of North Alabama. Florence, Alabama: Tennessee Valley Historical Society: 65–75. ISSN 0094-8039. LCCN 74646773. OCLC 1795446.
- Writers' Program of the Work Projects Administration (1941). Alabama: A Guide to the Deep South. Alabama State Planning Commission. New York: Hastings House.
