= Melton's Bluff, Alabama =

Extinct settlement on the Tennessee River

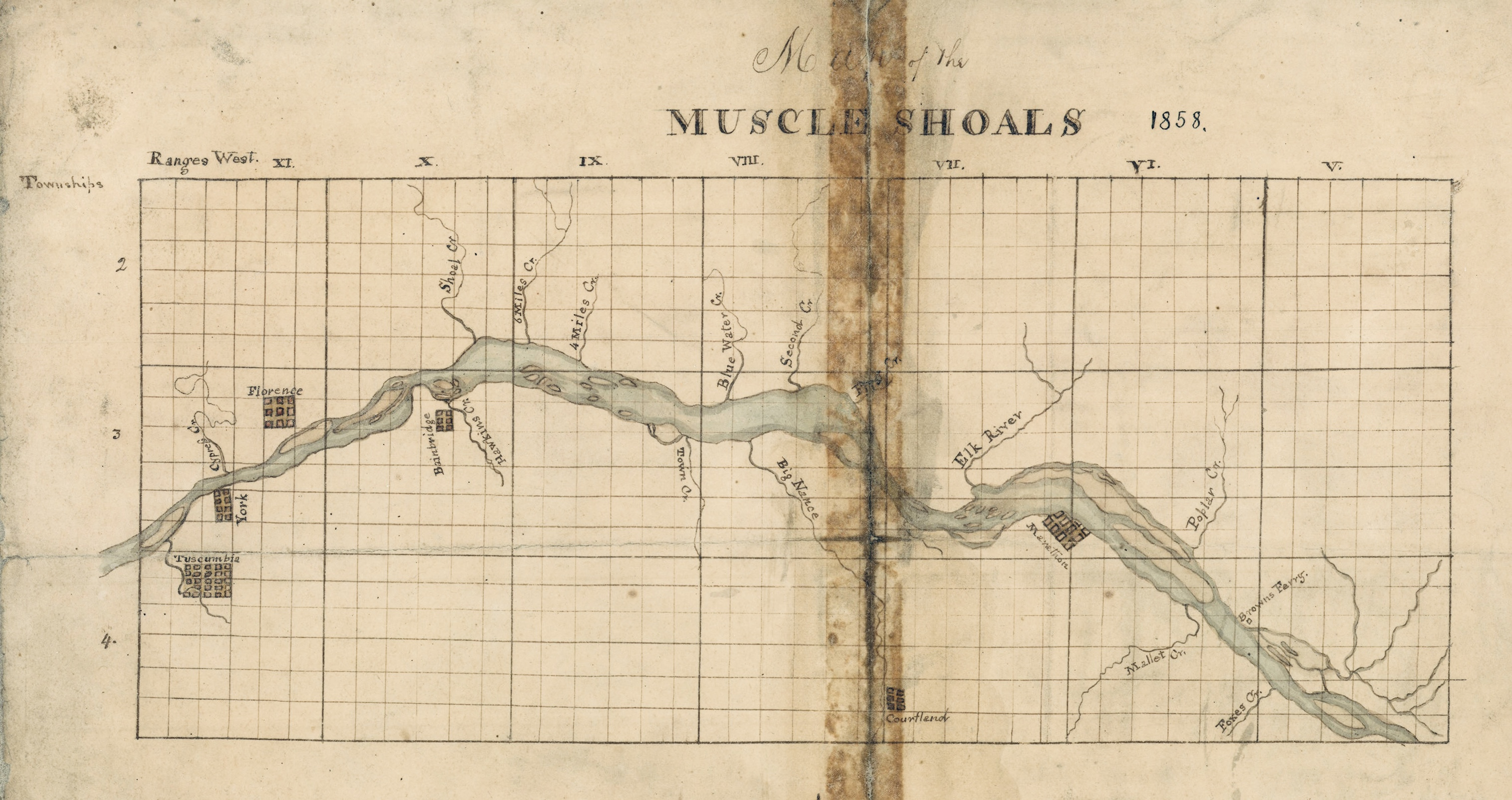
Hand-colored map of the Muscle Shoals section of the Tennessee River showing Marathon and the "seven islands" at Melton's Bluff; this map has been held by the Tennessee state library since 1858

Melton's Bluff is a landform and an extinct settlement in what is today Lawrence County, Alabama, United States, located in the Muscle Shoals section of the Tennessee River valley.

== Cherokee town ==
Historians postulate that Melton's Bluff was a "Cherokee stronghold" from about 1770, following the Battle of the Chickasaw Old Fields, after about 65 years of conflict between Shawnee, Chickasaw, and Cherokee over control of the Tennessee and Cumberland River valleys. In the 1790s, the site was connected to a series of attacks on travelers by boat. Sometimes the boats were simply pillaged. Other times the passengers and crew were killed. Cherokee warriors, including Chief Glass and Bowle, and an Irishman named John Melton were variously considered to be among those responsible.

The place was named for John Melton and his wife, a Cherokee woman of status, who first settled there in 1780. Their children together included Moses Melton, Charles Melton, David Melton, Thomas Melton, and Merida Melton. One of their daughters married a White man named Rhea who was from Rockbridge County, Virginia, and this Rhea was "the pilot who guided Anne Royall at the Muscle Shoals." She recorded that he "had piloted boats through the Muscle Shoals, fifteen years; sometimes four at a time, at ten dollars each. He sails down one day, and walks back the next."

There was, in the late 18th century, a complex of "Indian towns in Muscle Shoals" including Cherokee settlements led by Doublehead and "Katagiskee". A man named Samuel Hall briefly served as Indian agent at Melton's Bluff in 1802. A traveler of 1803 reported that he "rested two nights and a day at the Cherokee's named Doublehead, his town is on the south side of the Muscle shoals—understood that he supplied the American garrison below the shoals with beef—observed rapid and solicitous advances in civilization—Double-head had superintended and assisted in the operations. The men of the town worked in a body together similar to what are called frolicks in an American neighbourhood. While we were there they were making and repairing their fences, which they did very accurately and strongly...They went from house to house, and field to field finishing every one's fences as they went—abundance of victuals being provided for the company by the owners of the fields they fence." Melton built a plantation house and a tavern. When Moses Melton died in 1815 "his brother in Tennessee came into the nation and took all his cattle, horses, slaves, and other valuable property. Mrs. Melton complained to the [Indian agent Return J. Meigs], who hired a lawyer to protect her interest in the estate, but legally she was no more than a concubine. Melton's brother and American common law did not consider a pagan woman as a common-law wife."

Both the Gaines Trace and the Mitchell Trace passed by Melton's Bluff. Melton's Bluff was used as a crossing point for American militiamen in October 1813, November 1813, and October 1814 during the Creek War and War of 1812.

The approach from Tennessee to Melton's Bluff came via a road from Pulaski, Tennessee, leading to Campbell's Ferry. Campbell's Ferry was the site of an August 1816 meeting between surveyor general John Coffee and the Chickasaw and Cherokee to resolve overlapping claims to land in the vicinity. However, the parties could not come to terms so plans were made for a future negotiation. Melton's Bluff as a Cherokee settlement ended with the 1816 treaties.

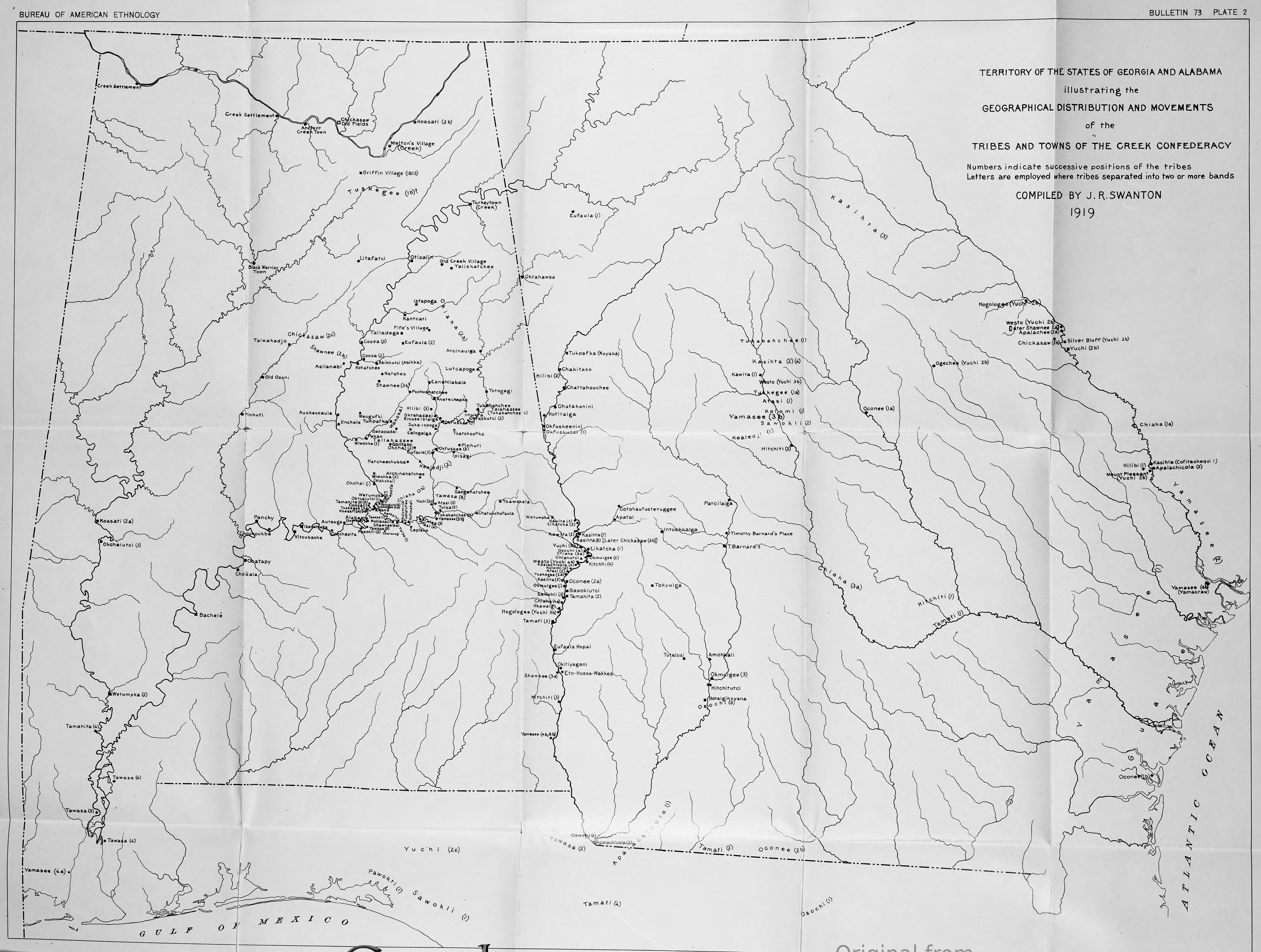
Map showing Charles Melton's Village on the Tennessee River (John R. Swanton, Early History of the Creek Nation and Their Neighbors, Bureau of American Ethnology Bulletin 73, 1922)

Melton's Village or Meltonville in Marshall County is named for Charles Melton.

The former farmland of John Melton in North Alabama, Lucy "Finch" Beddingfield (1832) was born into slavery. Local historians such as Rickey Butch Walker and family oral traditions indicate she was of mixed Cherokee, specifically the daughter of an unknown Muscogee-Black female slave and a Cherokee Indian father associated with the multi-ethnic Cherokee-Irish Melton family. In June 1888, she purchased 170 acres of land along the Elk River in Limestone County for $600, which was officially recorded under U.S. Land Patent #43463. In her later years, Bedingfield migrated west to Oklahoma, joining a broader movement of families relocating to the region. She died on December 19, 1910, in Okmulgee, Oklahoma, and is buried at Oakwood Cemetery. The Tennessee River inlet directly bordering this settlement was subsequently named "Lucy's Branch" in her honor.

== White colonization ==
Whatever village stood on the site was the site of the first court in Lawrence County, presided over by Obadiah Jones as late as 1820, and "the actual river bluffs are familiar to all old steamboaters".

The travel writer Anne Royall, a devoted admirer of Andrew Jackson, spent a few days at Melton's Bluff in January 1818 when Jackson owned a plantation there and she described the site in her letters:

No language can convey an idea of the beauties of Melton's Bluff. It is said to be the handsomest spot in the world, off the seabord; and rich as it is beautiful. I can sit in my room and see the whole plantation; the boats gliding down the river, and the opposite shore, one mile distant. The ducks, geese, and swans, playing at the same time on the bosom of the stream, with a full view of the many islands. It is, after all, the great height of the site that pleases. ...You can see up to Brown's Ferry, eight miles distant, with the naked eye-and the same distance down.

Jackson never lived at Melton's Bluff but his close friend John Coffee platted a town site there, called Marathon. Along with places like Bainbridge, Marathon, and other of these planned towns came to naught, despite the raging Alabama fever of white settlers. In the 1830s, "many of the same Cherokee who fought with Jackson in New Orleans would pass through Melton's Bluff via river barge and train during their removal to Oklahoma, in what would come to be known as the Trail of Tears."

Circa 1963, the site had been completely reforested but visitors using old maps and Royall's descriptions found an old brick fireplace buried under the soil. As of 2025, old Melton's Bluff can be found off "County Road 400 just east of the West Morgan-East Lawrence water treatment plant".

== See also ==
- Andrew Jackson's plantations in northern Alabama
- York's Bluff, Alabama
- Bainbridge, Alabama
- Cotton Gin Treaty
- Malcolm Gilchrist (speculator) § Boatman and cotton freighter

== Sources ==
- "Muscle Shoals National Heritage Area Interpretive Plan". nps.gov. January 15, 2013.
- McLoughlin, William Gerald (2018) [1986]. Cherokee Renascence in the New Republic (ebook ed.). Princeton, N.J.: Princeton University Press. ISBN 978-0-691-04741-6. JSTOR j.ctv39x611. LCCN 86042843. OCLC 13859438. OL 2129522W. Project MUSE book 61052.
- McDonald, William Lindsey (1995). "Melton's Bluff: Andrew Jackson's Cotton Plantation at the Muscle Shoals". Essays on the History of the Shoals from Pioneer Days to World War II. The Journal of Muscle Shoals History. 14. Sheffield, Alabama: Tennessee Valley Historical Society: 3–18. ISSN 0094-8039. OCLC 1795446.
- Rice, Turner (1975b). "The Cypress Land Company: A Dream of Empire". Journal of Muscle Shoals History. 3. University of North Alabama. Florence, Alabama: Tennessee Valley Historical Society: 21–35. ISSN 0094-8039. LCCN 74646773. OCLC 1795446.
- Royall, Anne Newport (1969). Griffith, Lucille (ed.). Letters from Alabama, 1817–1822. Southern Historical Publications No. 14. University of Alabama Press. ISBN 0817352198. LCCN 70076584. OCLC 13688. OL 7303383W.
- Wright, Amos J. (2003). Historic Indian Towns in Alabama, 1540–1838. Introduction by Vernon James. University of Alabama Press. ISBN 978-0-8173-8387-9. LCCN 2003000201. OCLC 772845336. Project MUSE book 22531.
