= Jackson and McMinn Treaty =

US and Cherokee 1817 treaty

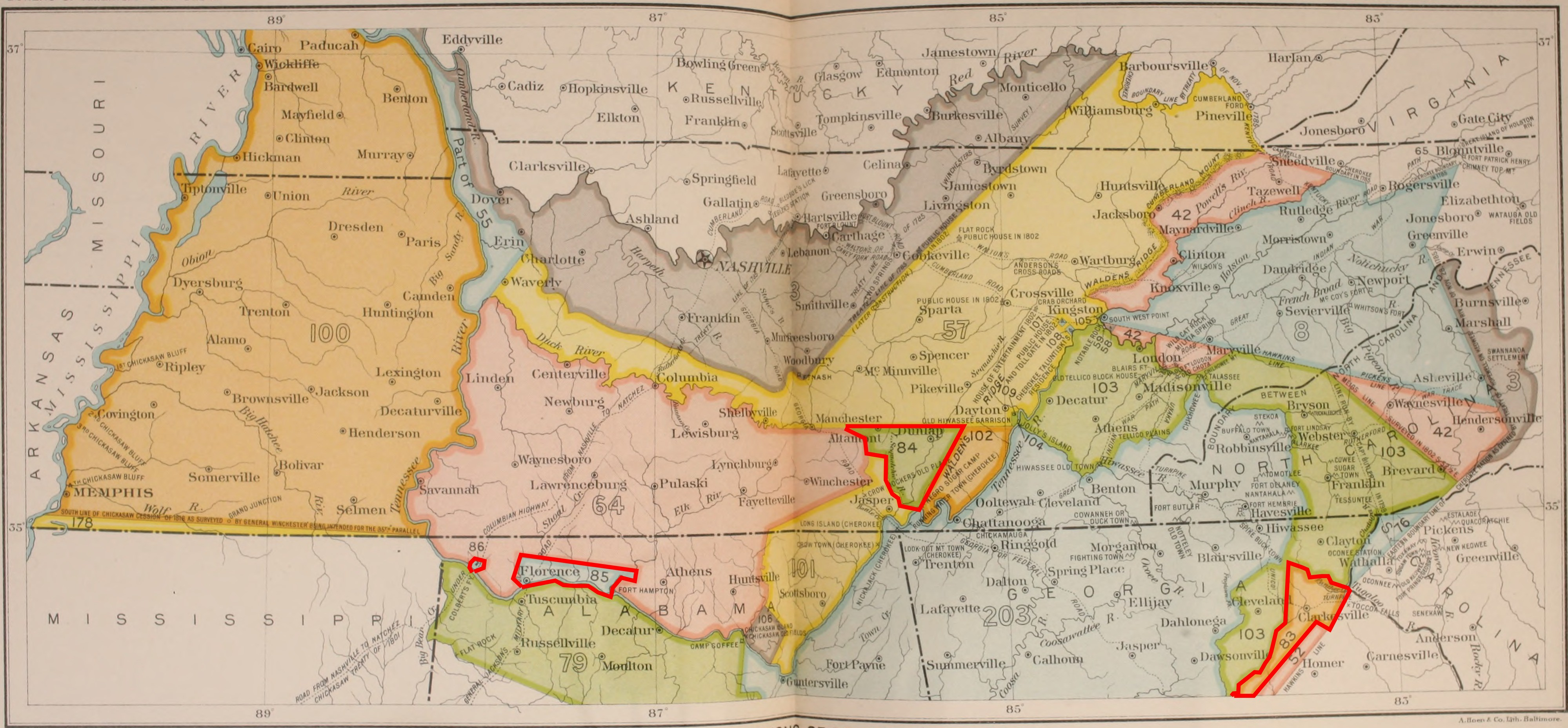
Acquisitions by the US from the Cherokee in the Jackson and McMinn Treaty of 1817. Territories acquired are outlined in red.

The Jackson and McMinn Treaty, also known as the Treaty with the Cherokee and the Treaty of the Cherokee Agency, settled land disputes between the United States, the Cherokee Nation, and other tribes following the early re-settlement of the Old Settlers of the Cherokee people to the Arkansaw Territory following the Red Stick War.

== Background ==
Following the War of 1812, and the concurrent Red Stick War, the U.S. government attempted to persuade the Cherokee tribes to a voluntary removal to the Arkansaw Territory. This effort was headed by the Indian agent, Return J. Meigs.

In 1816, Congress authorized Andrew Jackson, Tennessee governor Joseph McMinn, and David Meriwether "to conduct a treaty council with both the eastern Old Nation and Western Cherokees," to be held at the new Cherokee agency in Calhoun, Tennessee, in July 1817.The western Cherokee were represented by John D. Chisholm. Jackson noted of the negotiations, "We were compelled to promise to John D. Chisholm the sum of one thousand dollars to stop his mouth & obtain his consent, we have drew a hill in favor of Col. Meigs for this slim - without this we could not have got the national relinquishment." Another $600 was distributed to "other influential chiefs."

When the Cherokee arrived in Arkansaw, however, it was discovered that the land promised them was already in possession of other Native American peoples.

== Treaty ==
The outcome of subsequent negotiations resulted in the Jackson and McMinn Treaty, signed at the Cherokee Agency, July 8, 1817. The treaty transferred lands in Georgia along the Apalachee and Chattahoochee Rivers (Article I), lands in Tennessee fronted by the Sequatchie River (Article 2), and two areas in Alabama just north of the Tennessee River that had been ceded to the Cherokee chief Doublehead. (Article 10). In return for secured title to lands along the Arkansas and White Rivers for the Cherokee. In the treaty, the federal government also promised to fund the move of the Indians to the west.

Per historian Stanley W. Hoig, the main elements of the treaty were "cession of more Cherokee land, an agreement to issue annuities on a population basis between the Old Nation and Western Cherokees by virtue of a census to be made in 1818, a definition of Western Cherokee territory, establishment of an allotment of 640 acres in the ceded land for any adult Cherokee wishing to become a u.s. citizen, and government aid to any 'poor warrior' who removed to the West," consisting of "a rifle and ammunition, a blanket, five pounds of tobacco, and a brass kettle or, in lieu of the kettle, a beaver trap."

Whereas the treaty recognized the Cherokee as true title owners of the lands of West Tennessee, the treaty recognized the right of those Cherokee who wished to remain would do so separate and apart from any united States or Tennessee government, whereas the Cherokee were recognized as a sovereign people with the right to self-determination and self-governance separate and apart from the united States and Tennessee.

This treaty was "first phase of large-scale Indian removal, which was overseen by Joseph McMinn". However, "Neither the white citizenry nor the government had been satisfied by the Cherokee cession of land. At a council called by McMinn in November 1818, the Cherokees were told that the United States could no longer protect them from Americans who encroached on their land, corrupted their women, stole their stock, or made drunkards of their warriors. McMinn attempted to purchase all of their Old Nation territory for $100,000 with the expectation that the Cherokees would abandon their lands and relocate west of the Mississippi. The Cherokees would not listen, rejecting the idea in a statement signed by 72 chiefs and warriors."

== See also ==
- Jackson Purchase (U.S. historical region)

== Sources ==
- Hoig, Stanley W. (1998). The Cherokees and Their Chiefs: In the Wake of Empire. Fayetteville: University of Arkansas Press. doi:10.1353/book.124501. ISBN 978-1-61075-096-7. JSTOR jj.14250146. LCCN 98028930. OCLC 1371413376.
