= Bainbridge, Alabama =

Ghost town in Alabama, United States

Bainbridge, Alabama Bam Bridge Bambridge
- Ghost town
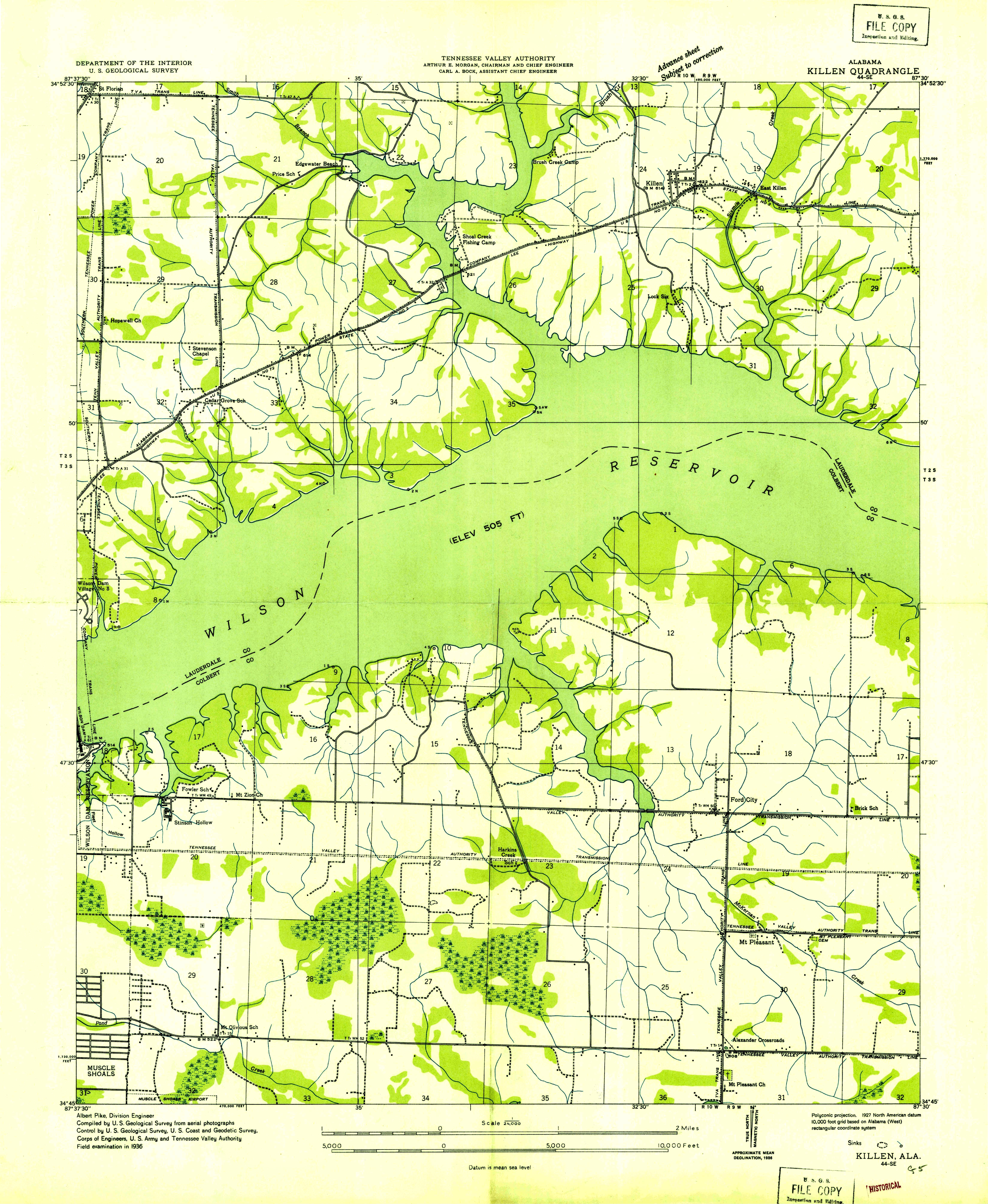
- 1936 USGS map of Wilson Reservoir submerging former location of Bainbridge, Alabama

- Location within Alabama Location within the United States
- Coordinates: 34°48′25″N 87°22′55″W
- Country: United States
- State: Alabama
- County: Lauderdale County

Bainbridge is a ghost town in Lauderdale County, Alabama, United States, in the northern part of the state near Muscle Shoals. The settlement is now submerged under Wilson Lake on the Tennessee River.

== History ==
Bainbridge was founded in 1819, at a location that had previously been known as Campbell's Ferry. It was named for Commodore William Bainbridge. The planned town was a speculation of the Muscle Shoal Land Company South of Tennessee River, interested parties included Lemuel Donelson, Robert Weakley, Robert P. Currin, Beverly Reese, Charles Boyles, Levi J. Gist, Turner Saunders, and John Donelson. The planned town came to little, so John Donelson IV (d. 1840) a grandson of John Donelson and nephew of Andrew Jackson, turned the land into a plantation.

Byler Road, the oldest extant public road in Alabama, was built through Bainbridge.

A ferry operated in Bainbridge that crossed over the Tennessee River.

In the 1840s, most of the town's population moved to Florence and Tuscumbia after Bainbridge was bypassed by a newly–constructed railroad. The Kernachan family bought the plantation after Donelson's death.

During the Civil War, Confederate General Nathan Bedford Forrest crossed the Tennessee River in Bainbridge, and with General Phillip Roddey, attacked the Union forces at Town Creek. At some point during the war all of the buildings on the Kernachan plantation were burned.

By 1924 all that remained of the settlement were hundred-year-old headstones in the cemetery. The land was eventually inundated by the Tennessee Valley Authority's Wilson Dam.

== See also ==
- York's Bluff, Alabama
- Marathon, Alabama
