= Muscle Shoals National Heritage Area =

United States National Heritage Area in Alabama

Coordinates: 34°46′35″N 87°37′26″W

Muscle Shoals National Heritage Area is a federally designated National Heritage Area in the northwestern portion of the U.S. state of Alabama. It is centered on the portion of the Tennessee River around Muscle Shoals and interprets the region's history and culture.

Muscle Shoals National Heritage Area comprises Lauderdale, Limestone, Colbert, Franklin, Lawrence and Morgan counties. Significant features of the heritage area include Wheeler Dam, Wilson Dam, Ivy Green, Rosenbaum House, Barton Hall and the northern end of the Natchez Trace.

Muscle Shoals National Heritage Area was established by the Omnibus Public Land Management Act of 2009, which was signed into law on 30 March 2009. It is administered by the University of North Alabama.
