= Doublehead =

Cherokee leader (1744–1807)

Doublehead (c. 1744–August 7, 1807), or Incalatanga (Cherokee: ᏔᎵᏧᏍᎦ, romanized: Talitsus'ga, also spelled as Tal-tsu'tsa), was one of the most feared warriors of the Cherokee during the Cherokee–American wars in the Upper South region. Following the peace treaty at the Tellico Blockhouse in 1794, he served as one of the leaders of the Chickamauga Cherokee (or "Lower Cherokee"), and was chosen as the leader of Chickamauga (taking on the title Chuqualataque) in 1802.

== Personal life ==
It is thought that Doublehead's father was Great Eagle (or Willenewa), a nephew of Chief Old Hop and a cousin of Chief Attakullakulla (or Little Carpenter). He was a brother of Old Tassel, "First Beloved Man" of the Overhill Cherokee. Two of his relatives, Tahlonteeskee and John Jolly, were also leaders among the Chickamauga and both later became Principal Chiefs of the Cherokee Nation. Doublehead's last wife was Nancy Drumgoole. Their youngest son, Bird Doublehead, was only twelve years old at the time of Doublehead's assassination.

Living in the Overhill Towns on the Little Tennessee River, he sporadically took part in the campaigns of Dragging Canoe as they were under a flag of truce during an embassy to the State of Franklin in 1788, until the murder of his brother, and another pacifist chief, Abraham of Chilhowee. Thereafter, he became one of the most vicious fighters and most capable leaders of the Cherokee during war.

== Beginnings as a war leader ==
Doublehead's first act in his 1788 crusade was to lead a party of warriors in concert with those of Dragging Canoe in an assault on White's Fort in East Tennessee. Thereafter, he and his warriors operated somewhat independently, though occasionally joining Dragging Canoe's campaigns, operating from his new settlement of Coldwater at the head of the Muscle Shoals on the Tennessee River in what is now the state of Alabama. The location at the time was within the territory claimed by the Chickasaw, but Doublehead solved that problem by marrying two daughters to George Colbert, the chief of the Chickasaw town at the foot of the Shoals. Doublehead's band included not only Cherokee, but Muskogee, Shawnee, and renegade Chickasaw (whose council and chiefs were adamantly opposed to the wars).

== Activities in later years of the wars ==
Beginning in 1791, Doublehead began operating closely with the parties of his great-nephew, Bob Benge, who was to become one of the most feared warriors on the frontier, and Benge's brother, The Tail, who was then based in Willstown.

In 1791, Doublehead was among a delegation of Cherokees who visited U.S. President George Washington in Philadelphia.

Following the death of Dragging Canoe in 1792, he became part of a triumvirate of leaders among the Chickamauga, along with Bloody Fellow and his nephew, John Watts, who was recognized as the chief of them.

In September 1792, Watts orchestrated a large campaign into the Cumberland region of combined Cherokee and Muskogee forces which included a contingent of cavalry. It was to be a three-pronged attack in which Tahlonteeskee (or Talotiskee) of the Muskogee (who was either a Creek chief or a relative of Doublehead by that name) led a force to ambush the Kentucky road; Middle Striker led another to do the same on the Walton road; while Watts himself led the main army which was made up of 280 Cherokee, Shawnee, and Muskogee warriors and cavalry, against a settlement on the Cumberland River known as Buchanan's Station on September 30, 1792. Among the attackers were "Shawnee Warrior" (also known as Chiksika); Tahlonteeskee; and Dragging Canoe's brother, Little Owl—all of whom died in the encounter. Also wounded in the attack was Pumpkin Boy, a younger brother of Doublehead.

Following the three failed attacks on the Mero District, Doublehead, Pumpkin Boy, and their nephew Bob Benge led a raid into southwestern Kentucky during which their warriors, in an act initiated by Doublehead, cannibalized the enemies they had just killed. Their act was in imitation of the Iroquois, particularly the Mohawk, who were alleged to have done so to intimidate their enemies (especially during the Beaver Wars). Though every warrior present partook, Benge never operated with Doublehead afterward, sickened at his actions and at his own, nor did the later leader, The Ridge, who also took part.

== Beginning of his troubles with James Vann ==
In 1793, a delegation of Shawnee stopped in Ustanali, the principal city of the Cherokee, on their way to call on the Muskogee and Choctaw to punish the Chickasaw for joining St. Clair's army in the north. Watts sent envoys to Knoxville, then the capital of the Southwest Territory, to meet with Governor William Blount to discuss terms for peace. This party, which included Bob McLemore, Tahlonteeskee, Captain Charley of Running Water, and Doublehead, along with the white delegation, was attacked by militia during a stop at the Overhill town of Coyatee. Hanging Maw was wounded, and several others, including his wife, daughter, and one of the white delegates, were killed. The Cherokee agreed to await the outcome of the subsequent trial, which was later proven to be a farce because the man who was responsible was a close friend of John Sevier.

Watts responded by invading the Holston area with one of the largest Indian forces ever seen in the region—over one thousand Cherokee, Muskogee, and Shawnee—intending to attack Knoxville itself. On the way, the Cherokee leaders were discussing among themselves whether to kill all the inhabitants of Knoxville, or just the men, James Vann advocating the latter while Doublehead argued for the former. Further on the way, they encountered a small settlement called Cavett's Station. After they had surrounded the place, Benge negotiated with the inhabitants, agreeing that if they surrendered, their lives would be spared. However, after the settlers had walked out, Doublehead's group and his Muskogee allies attacked and began killing them over the pleas of Benge and the others. Vann managed to grab one small boy and pull him onto his saddle, only to have Doublehead smash the boy's skull with an axe. Watts intervened in time to save another young boy, handing him to Vann, who put the boy behind him on his horse and later handed him over to three of the Muskogee for safe keeping. Unfortunately, one of the Muskogee chiefs killed the boy and scalped him a few days later.

Because of this incident, Vann called Doublehead "Babykiller" for the remainder of his life. This incident also started a lengthy feud that defined the politics of the early 19th-century Cherokee Nation.

== After the wars ==
Doublehead was elected first Speaker of the Cherokee National Council when the Cherokee formed its first nascent national government in 1794. He became one of the foremost advocates of acculturation and became one of the richest men in the Cherokee Nation—the Lower Towns where he was a leader were then the wealthiest section of the entire country. He was also a chief advocate of land sales, along with several older chiefs in the Lower Towns, whose number included Dragging Canoe's brother, Turtle at Home. This only increased the enmity between him and his chief rival, James Vann.

Upon the death of his nephew, Principal Chief John Watts, in 1802, Doublehead was chosen as the leader of Chickamauga (taking on the title Chuqualataque).

A treaty was signed on October 25, 1805, for the location of a fort (the Hiwassee Garrison) opposite and below the mouth of the Hiwassee River and on the North Bank of the Tennessee River. As part of this treaty, a secret article was applicable to a small tract of land at and below the mouth of the Clinch River: one mile square at the foot of the Cumberland Mountains for the benefit of Chief Doublehead, and one square mile on the north bank of the Tennessee River where Cherokee Talootiske lived.

== Death ==
On August 7, 1807, Doublehead was killed, because of his ongoing machinations with U.S. Indian Affairs Commissioner Return J. Meigs, Jr. regarding under-the-table land deals, as well as personal animosity going back nearly two decades, several of the younger leaders of the Nation, led by James Vann, conspired to assassinate Doublehead. Meanwhile, Doublehead lost part of his thumb in a scuffle with a Cherokee named Bone Polisher. James Vann had initially planned to lead the assault but had become too drunk to take part.

The Ridge (later known as Major Ridge) and Alexander Sanders, shot the injured chief in McIntosh's Tavern at the Hiwassee Garrison near the Cherokee Agency (now Calhoun, Tennessee). The badly wounded Doublehead sought safety in the attic of schoolmaster Jonathan Blacke's house, where the assassins finished the job with knives and tomahawks.

At the time of the murder of Chief Doublehead, Thomas Norris Clark, John D. Chisholm, and Major Return J. Meigs had been appointed the executors of the estate by Chief Doublehead, and he wished that his estate be disposed of in the manner of white people and his wishes were read and approved by the Cherokee Council. Chief Doublehead's son Birdsong Doublehead, who was twelve years old and living in the Clarks' home at the time of his father's murder, stayed there until his father's estate could be settled, and then Clark took him down to Mussel Shoals Alabama to be with his mother Nancy Drumgoole, the last wife of Chief Doublehead.

Several related events followed. Walker's Ferry on the Hiwassee River was owned by John Walker, Jr., a mixed-blood who was one of Vann's associates. In July 1834, because of his advocacy of removal in the years leading up to the Treaty of New Echota, Walker was assassinated on the road home from Red Clay, Tennessee, after a meeting of the Cherokee National Council. His killers were James Foreman and his half-brother Anderson Springston. In June 1839, after the Cherokee Removal to Indian Territory, Major Ridge, his son John Ridge, and nephew Elias Boudinot were accused of the same crime as that of Doublehead and themselves became the targets of assassins. Among the killers of Major Ridge were James Foreman, Anderson Springston, Isaac Springston, and Bird Doublehead. In the traditional Cherokee matrilineal worldview, these men were all full brothers. They each shared the same mother: Nannie Drumgoole, last wife of Doublehead. Drumgoole was a descendant of Alexander Drumgoole, a trader to the Cherokees.

A fictional version of Doublehead's execution is in Dee Brown's novel Creek Mary's Blood.

== See also ==
- Sequoyah

== Bibliography ==
- Evans, E. Raymond. "Notable Persons in Cherokee History: Bob Benge". Journal of Cherokee Studies, Vol. 1, No. 2, pp. 98–106. (Cherokee: Museum of the Cherokee Indian, 1976).
- Flint, Timothy. Indian Wars of the West; Containing Biographical Sketches of Those Pioneers Who Headed the Western Settlers in Repelling the Attacks of the Savages, Together with a View of the Character, Manners, Monuments, and Antiquities of the Western Indians. Cincinnati: E. H. Flint, 1833, p. 116.
- Hicks, Brian. Toward the Setting Sun: John Ross, the Cherokees, and the Trail of Tears. New York: Atlantic Monthly Press, 2011. ISBN 978-0-8021-1963-6
- Klink, Karl, and James Talman, ed. The Journal of Major John Norton. (Toronto: Champlain Society, 1970).
- Langguth, A. J. Driven West: Andrew Jackson and the Trail of Tears to the Civil War. New York, Simon & Schuster. 2010. ISBN 978-1-4165-4859-1.
- McLoughlin, William G. Cherokee Renascence in the New Republic. (Princeton: Princeton University Press, 1992).
- Mooney, James. Myths of the Cherokee and Sacred Formulas of the Cherokee. (Nashville: Charles and Randy Elder-Booksellers, 1982).
- Moore, John Trotwood and Austin P. Foster. Tennessee, The Volunteer State, 1769–1923, Vol. 1. (Chicago: S. J. Clarke Publishing Co., 1923).
- Pynes, Patrick. "Historic Origins of the Mount Tabor Indian Community of Rusk County, Texas." Sixty-Seven Nations and Counting: Proceedings of the Seventh Native American Symposium. Eds. Mark B. Spencer and Rachel Tudor. Southeastern Oklahoma State University, 2008. 69–77.
- Ramsey, James Gettys McGready. The Annals of Tennessee to the End of the Eighteenth Century. (Chattanooga: Judge David Campbell, 1926).
- Walker, Rickey Butch. Doublehead: Last Chickamauga Cherokee Chief. Killen, Alabama: Bluewater Publications, 2012.
- Wilkins, Thurman. Cherokee Tragedy: The Ridge Family and the Decimation of a People. (New York: Macmillan Company, 1970).
- Ehle, John. Trail of Tears, The Rise and Fall of the Cherokee Nation. (New York: Anchor Books, 1988).

Preceded by John Watts	Leader of the Chickamauga/Lower Cherokee; 1802–1807	Succeeded by The Glass
