= James C. Bronaugh =

U.S. Army surgeon (1788–1822)

- Portrait by Ralph E. W. Earl
- Born: July 14, 1788; Loudoun County, Virginia
- Died: September 1822 (aged 34); Pensacola, Florida Territory
- Occupations: Medical doctor, assistant surgeon general, Florida territorial legislator

James Craine Bronaugh (July 14, 1788–September 1–3, 1822) was a Virginia-born medical doctor. He served as a regimental surgeon of the United States Army during the War of 1812. He was named assistant surgeon general for the Division of the South in 1818. He was involved in multiple duels, including one that killed his cousin Armistead T. Mason in 1819. He had a close relationship with Major General Andrew Jackson and was a witness to the U.S.–Choctaw Treaty of Doak's Stand in 1820. After his discharge in 1821, Bronaugh relocated to Pensacola. He was later classed by Florida historians as one of the "cronies" of Jackson who made up the so-called "land office faction" in territorial politics. Bronaugh was unanimously elected first president of the legislative council of Florida Territory in July 1822. He died in a yellow fever outbreak at Pensacola in September 1822.

== Early life and career ==
James Craine Bronaugh was a son of William Bronaugh and his third wife, Rebecca Craine. William Bronaugh was a first cousin of Founding Father George Mason IV. Bronaugh was an officer with George Washington in the French and Indian War. He became a planter in Loudoun County, Virginia. J. C. Bronaugh graduated from University of Pennsylvania School of Medicine, class of 1809. He wrote a thesis on hepatitis.

Bronaugh joined the United States Army for the War of 1812, beginning as a surgeon for the 12th Regiment of Infantry on April 28, 1812. Bronaugh was assigned to Andrew Jackson's headquarters in April 1816. In April 1818 he was promoted from hospital surgeon to an assistant surgeon general of the U.S. Army. This meant he was responsible for "the medical inspector for the division, district, department or army to which he is attached," in Bronaugh's case, the Division of the South.

== Duels ==
Bronaugh listed top right of the page in a register of the "New Army" (Eastern Shore General Advertiser, June 9, 1812)

Bronaugh was said to be an avid duelist. On May 17, 1813, he dueled Major John Stanard of the 20th Infantry. Stanard was shot in the thigh and expected to live, Bronaugh was unhurt. The duel took place in the vicinity of Fort Niagara "near the Canadian line." Bronaugh was said to be "a celebrated shot" and reportedly "told his opponent that he did not intend to kill him, but would lame him for life." According to the memoirs of Mordecai Myers, "Major Z. Taylor (late President of the U.S.) was associated with me as friends to Major Stanard. Captain Randolph and another gentleman were friends to the Doctor."

Bronaugh sent another duel challenge to a fellow officer at Grenadier Island in October 1813. One of his opponents, Colonel Isaac A. Coles, was court-martialed on charges brought by Bronaugh; Coles was acquitted and restored to honorable service. Coles had earlier been a private secretary to President Thomas Jefferson. In August 1814, Jefferson wrote Coles that he had received the copy of his pamphlet, To the Public, containing 13 documents defending himself against "charges brought against him" by Bronaugh, and that "your friends here, to whom you were best known, never doubted that your conduct had been proper & honorable under every circumstance." Coles claimed in print in 1815 that Bronaugh boasted of having been "principal or second in thirty-two affairs of honor."

== Diplomacy ==
On September 16, 1818, Bronaugh, John Patton Erwin, William Berkeley Lewis, and Ephraim H. Foster, on behalf of the people of Nashville, invited Governor of Kentucky Isaac Shelby to public dinner "rendering some tribute of respect for the many eminent services by which your life has been and is distinguished." Shelby accepted; host Edward Ward toasted to Shelby; John Eaton toasted to Jackson; E. H. Foster toasted to Kentucky and Tennessee, "rival sisters on the field of martial glory." Jackson hosted Shelby at the Hermitage until September 26, "when the two commissioners wended their way southward to meet the Chickasaws at their Old Town near the present Tuscumbia" to negotiate what became the Treaty of Tuscaloosa, resulting in the cession of what is now western Tennessee and western Kentucky.

On December 18, 1818, Bronaugh testified before the Congressional committee investigating Jackson's invasion of Florida. Jackson's political rebuttal to the claims made in Abner Lacock's report, known as "Strictures on Mr. Lacock's Report on the Seminole War," was "probably" co-written by Bronaugh and Richard Keith Call and was published in March 1819.

The Friend of the Laws and Commercial Journal, New Orleans, March 16, 1819

In June 1819 Bronaugh traveled with Edmund P. Gaines to Nashville where James Monroe was to arrive shortly. Bronaugh and former Congressman Samuel Hogg established a joint medical practice in Nashville in 1819.

In October 1820 he was a witness to the Treaty of Doak's Stand between the Choctaw and U.S. Indian commissioners Andrew Jackson and Thomas Hinds. Bronaugh served with Andrew Jackson until his honorable discharge June 1, 1821.

== Florida ==
In February 1821, Jackson wrote Bronaugh, encouraging him to embark on a slave-trading speculation as Florida changed hands: "With a small fund, and good recommendations a great spec might be made at Pensacola and Ft St Augustine, by the purchase of negroes from subjects who will leave the Territory. with a fourth advanced, one two and three years might be obtained for the ballance well guranteed."

The same month, a New Yorker named J. D. Steele wrote several newsy letters home about his tour of Tennessee. He described the local reception to the soon-to-be-signed Adams-Onís Treaty, Jackson's local acolytes and enemies, Jackson's apparent preference for nepotism appointments, and mentioned Bronaugh's involvement an 1819 duel in which John McCarty killed Armistead Thomson Mason (Bronaugh had backed Mason):

The supposed ratification of the Spanish treaty is deprecated here, partly because Texas is deemed much more valuable than Florida, & partly—(and principally) because they wish to extend the southern & slave holding interest as widely as possible—to crush the growing power of the Eastern states—now evinced to their sorrow in the choice of a speaker. This kind of sectional prejudice is the bane of our union & together with the unhappy disposition of our countrymen for territorial aggrandizement will one day make 'What enemies could ne'er have done, Our arch of empire stedfast but for you, A mutilated structure soon to fall.'...Saturday morning. In my way to Nashville I mistook my road & by so doing passed Genl Jacksons plantation. It is handsomely situated abt 12 miles from the city, as it is termed, & the Genl has just removed into a very fine brick house, which would do credit to any country. In my way to town I met the mighty chief—he was attended by a single servant. I find that Genl has a large party opposed to him in Tenn, perhaps the most numerous & respectable class. His private character presents nothing to recommend him (at least with us, for he is a very profane man—a horse racer—a great duellist—& his wife he took by force from another man) & his public conduct in the selection of officers differs widely from that disinterested, independent & delicate course which was the policy of Washington. He never placed a relative in office, determined to be like Caesar's wife beyond suspicion. Genl J fills the offices in his staff with his relatives, however illy they may be qualified. His partisans, go to every length for him—one of them assured me that he possessed a 'powerful & an omnipotent mind'—while another labored to prove to me that Genl J was great even in his iniquities—that he never used the common vulgar oaths, as 'may I be most essentially d--d etc'—that he never asserted a thing & then swore to it—he was above that—but his oaths were like his actions, great, strong & expressive—his favorite oath being—'by the eternal God.' The eagerness with which Genl J formerly engaged in—& still patronises duelling, has tended to increase, the practice here greatly & perhaps Nashville stands first in the Union with the number of scientific operators—Doct Bronough (to whom I was introduced) is eminently skillful in that department of phlebotomy & is considered as authority here, when a difference arises. He visits his patients with a pair of pistols upon his saddle—& was second to Genl Mason in the barbarous duel with muskets at Bladensburgh.

Jackson served as military governor of Florida from July to November 1821. Bronaugh accompanied Jackson to Pensacola. Other members of the party were Rachel Jackson, nephew Andrew Jackson Donelson, niece Narcissa Hays, family steward Ephraim A. Blain, and family slaves. During the American takeover Jackson insulted and briefly imprisoned José María Callava, the outgoing royal governor of Spanish West Florida. Bronaugh contributed to the discourse an affidavit rationalizing Jackson's conduct. One of Jackson's official acts as commissioner was instituting a 24-hour quarantine from June 1 to October 31, to occur annually, preventing visitors from entering within "cannon-shot range" from Fort St. Carlos de Barrancas until they had been cleared of possible contagion. In a letter of August 1821, Jackson wrote the Monroe administration that Bronaugh had acted as his personal secretary. According to the Fifth Auditor's Report of the Government Accounting Office Bronaugh was paid US$1,750 (equivalent to $42,328 in 2025) for this service. The same month, August 1821, Bronaugh was surgeon for a duel at a Pensacola that was fatal to a former U.S. Army lieutenant named Hull. Bronaugh was assigned to deliver Jackson's resignation letter to James Monroe.

Florida, 1822, mapped by Fielding Lucas Jr. of Baltimore (David Ramsey Map Collection)

Jackson recommended Bronaugh for the position of receiver of public monies for the government land office in West Florida, but Bronaugh was not appointed. Bronaugh served as president of the Pensacola board of health 1821 to 1822.

According to historian Herbert Doherty, five of the first 13 appointments to the legislative council of Florida Territory were "cronies of Jackson": Bronaugh, Richard K. Call, Henry Marie Brackenridge, Edgar Macon, and John Miller. Bronaugh was "unanimously chosen" president of the first legislative council of the Territory of Florida, on July 22, 1822. In his inaugural address to the council, Bronaugh "said that he was conscious of possessing but little practical experience of the forms of legislation and he modestly expressed doubt that he would be able to come up to the just expectations of the members of the Council, but he called on them for guidance and support" in hopes that "by the usefulness of our labors, satisfy the expectations of the people of Florida, and justify the confidence of the president and congress of the United States." Call and Bronaugh became the respective leaders of competing local factions, at least for purposes of that specific election cycle. One of the issues was suffrage qualification: "Bronaugh and his followers favored a broad manhood suffrage which would even have included members of military units stationed in Florida. Call and his followers generally favored restricting the vote, except where the old inhabitants were concerned." Bronaugh was a candidate for delegate to Congress from Florida Territory in 1822.

== Death and legacy ==
"Mortality of Pensacola" Alexandria Gazette, October 8, 1822

Being "dangerously ill" on August 29, 1821, Bronaugh dictated a will, leaving his slaves Dick, and "Sally and her child," to his mother, and bequeathing his books to H. M. Brackenridge. Bronaugh died from yellow fever on September 1 or 2 or 3, 1822, "after a severe illness of several days. Florida governor William Pope Duval wrote to Monroe from Pensacola on September 10 with an account of the outbreak, in which an estimated 120 people died:

DEAR SIR. It is with deep sorrow that I annouce to you the death of my friends Doct Bronaugh and Mr Harrison, late Attorney for the United States on the 10th of August the yellow fever commenced in Pensacola with dreadful distruction—Very few of the great number that have been taken down, have recovered—Capt Simms from Alexandria is also dead, I believe he held the appointment of Navy agent at Pensacola

The best and most intelligent part of our American population has already fallen victims to this distructive fever—No hope is entertained of its abatement untill frost, which will not commence untill the last of October

I lived with my friend Doct Bronaugh in Col Waltons family, It is almost a wonder that I escaped—for every member of his family has been or is now down with the fever except himself and his venerable mother I fear he will take the fever, and expect every day to hear this distressing intelligence

The Spanish inhabitants stand it much better than our own people—not that they are exempt, for many of them have been, and now are sick—but few have yet died.

As requested by Bronaugh in his will, his estate slaves were put into the temporary care of Jackson, and were escorted on their journey by Edward Augustus Rutledge. (Rutledge, age 20, was a scion of the Middleton-Rutledge-Pinckney family who worked for Jackson as a translator.) Jackson was then to forward the slaves on to Bronaugh's mother, but Jackson wrote in November 1822 that Bronaugh's body man "Dick has become so much edicted to drink that I could not trust him. I have detained them here untill I hear from Madam Bronaugh to whom I had written some time ago—and again on yesterday." In June 1821, Dick had been trusted enough to carry letters to and from Jackson and Call between Montpelier, Alabama, and Pensacola. Dick was eventually restored to Rebecca Craine Bronaugh who deeded him to her daughter, Sarah Bronaugh, James' sister. Sarah Bronaugh wrote President Jackson in August 1830, asking about debts on her brother's estate and apparently offering Dick for sale. Jackson replied "I have no wish to purchase any negroes; if Dick was not intemperate, Major Lewis having the mother & family of Dicks wife, might purchase, but as you have not named a price, I can give you no information as to the Majors determination on that subject—if I was disposed to purchase I have not the means—."

On June 3, 1830, Jackson paid US$900 (equivalent to $27,211 in 2025) to Jeremiah Bronaugh, James and Sarah's half-brother, for Dick, Sally, and their four children. In April 1833, Jackson ordered William B. Lewis to check on the health of Hannah, Dick and Sally's oldest daughter, "who was confined with a pain in her hip when Sarah & Andrew left her." Lewis reported back, "When she was first taken Sally tells me she could not walk at all and suffered much pain. She can now walk a little, and her pains are not so distressing. Indeed she told me she suffered little or no pain except of nights...She is a very pretty little girl and, as she will no doubt make a valuable servant, if she lives and gets well, I have some thought of getting Dr. Hogg to ride up and see her, for I am apprehensive Dr. Mc.Corkle does not understand the nature of her complaint." Jackson replied with orders to fetch Dr. Hogg and the comment, "I would be sorry she would become a cripple. you may say to Doctor Hogg, that her lameness was occasioned by a stroke from [Hermitage cook] Betty, or jumping over a rope, in which her feet became entangled, & she fell & hurt her hip." Jackson asked relatives about the health of young Hannah and another ailing slave, Adam, several times in 1834.

Bronough Street in Tallahassee is named for James C. Bronaugh; the reason for the misspelling is unknown.

== See also ==
- Spanish Florida § Second Spanish Period
- Rhea letter
- Andrew Jackson and land speculation
- Andrew Jackson and the slave trade
- List of duels in the United States
- Joseph Lovell, surgeon general
- William Preston Anderson, another Virginia-born military aide to Jackson
- John S. Reid, another Virginia-born military aide to Jackson
- Stockley D. Hays, one of Jackson's nephews and judge advocate for the Division of the South

== Sources ==
- n.a. (April 1953). "West Florida, Three Centuries Under Four Flags, Conquest and Disease". Journal of the Florida Medical Association. XXXIX (10). Jacksonville: 749–765. ISSN 0015-4148. OCLC 1569461. PMID 13035023 – via New York Academy of Medicine Library, Internet Archive.
- Carter, Clarence Edwin, ed. (1956). Volume XXII: The Territory of Florida, 1821–1824. The Territorial Papers of the United States. Washington, D.C.: U.S. Government Printing Office. Publication No. 57-4 – via HathiTrust; digitized by Google Books from a copy held by the Harvard University Libraries.
- Cheathem, Mark R. (2007). Old Hickory's Nephew: The Political and Private Struggles of Andrew Jackson Donelson. Southern Biography Series. Baton Rouge: Louisiana State University Press. ISBN 978-0-8071-3238-8. LCCN 2006024951. OCLC 70866891. Project MUSE book 16672.
- Doherty, Herbert J. (July 1954). "The Governorship of Andrew Jackson". Florida Historical Quarterly. 33 (1): 3–31. ISSN 0015-4113. JSTOR 30139730.
- ——— (July 1955a). "Andrew Jackson's Cronies in Florida Territorial Politics: With Three Unpublished Letters to His Cronies". The Florida Historical Quarterly. 34 (1): 3–29. ISSN 0015-4113. JSTOR 30139730.
- ——— (October 1955b). "Andrew Jackson vs. The Spanish Governor: Pensacola 1821". The Florida Historical Quarterly. 34 (2). Florida Historical Society: 142–158. ISSN 0015-4113. JSTOR 30139745.
- DuVal, Wm. P. (April 1933). "The First Session of the Legislative Council of Florida at Pensacola, July 22, 1822". The Florida Historical Society Quarterly. 11 (4). Florida Historical Society: 184–189. ISSN 0361-624X. JSTOR 30150147.
- Jackson, Andrew (1994). Moser, Harold; Hoth, David; Hoemann, George (eds.). The Papers of Andrew Jackson: Volume IV, 1816–1820. University of Tennessee Press. doi:10.7290/utp8684. ISBN 978-0-87049-778-0.
- ——— (1996). Moser, Harold; Hoth, David; Hoemann, George (eds.). The Papers of Andrew Jackson: Volume V, 1821–1824. University of Tennessee Press. doi:10.7290/utp7345. ISBN 978-0-87049-897-8.
- ——— (2010). Feller, Daniel; Coens, Thomas; Moss, Laura-Eve (eds.). The Papers of Andrew Jackson, Volume VIII, 1830. University of Tennessee Press. doi:10.7290/utp6455. ISBN 978-1-57233-715-2.
- ——— (2019). Feller, Daniel; Moss, Laura-Eve; Coens, Thomas (eds.). The Papers of Andrew Jackson, Volume XI, 1833. University of Tennessee Press. doi:10.7290/utp7008. ISBN 978-1-62190-538-7.
- Jefferson, Thomas (2010). Looney, J. Jefferson (ed.). The Papers of Thomas Jefferson, Retirement Series, Volume 7: 28 November 1813 to 30 September 1814. Princeton: Princeton University Press. ISBN 978-0-691-12121-5. LCCN 2004048327. Project MUSE book 33765.
- Morris, Allen; Maguire, Amelia Rae (1978). "Beginnings of Popular Government in Florida". Florida Historical Quarterly. 57 (1): 19–38. ISSN 0015-4113. JSTOR 30139730.
- Myers, M. (1900). Reminiscences, 1780 to 1814, including incidents in the war of 1812–14. Washington: The Crane co. hdl:loc.gdc/scd0001.00118371239. LCCN 02017436.
- Patterson, Archibald Williams (1927). The code duello, with special reference to the state of Virginia. Richmond: Richmond Press. LCCN 28002816. OCLC 1950913.
- Remini, Robert V. (Fall 1978). "A New York 'Yankee' in Tennessee, 1821". Tennessee Historical Quarterly. 37 (3). Tennessee Historical Society: 278–292. ISSN 0040-3261. JSTOR 42625878.
- Various; Jackson, Andrew (1928). Bassett, John Spencer (ed.). Correspondence of Andrew Jackson, Volume III, 1820–1828. Carnegie institution of Washington – via Internet Archive.
- Williams, Samuel C. (April 1931). "Nashville as Seen by Travelers, 1801–1821". Tennessee Historical Magazine. 1 (3). Tennessee Historical Society: 182–206. ISSN 2333-9012. JSTOR 42637587.
