= Andrew Jackson and land speculation =

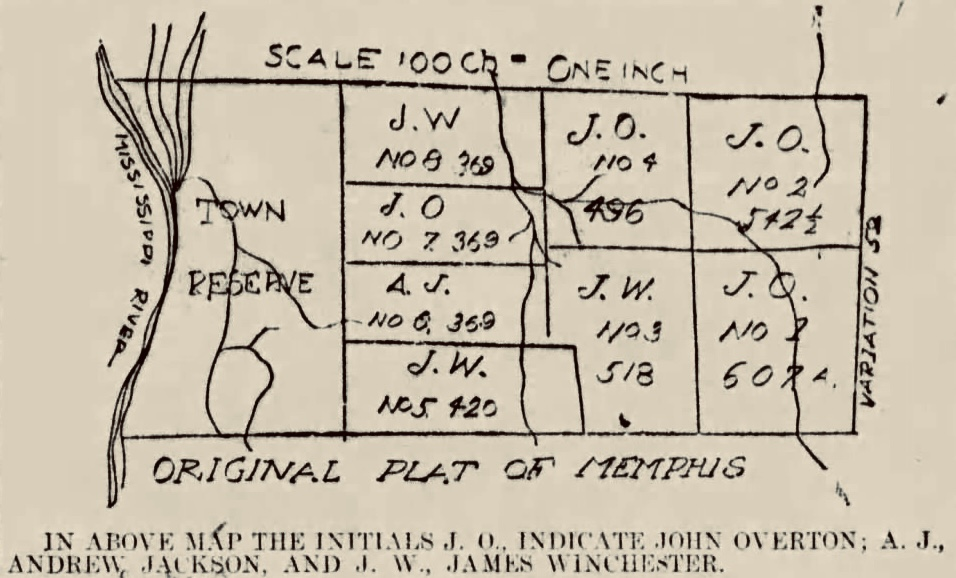
Original plat of Memphis; land owned by Andrew Jackson marked A. J. (Memphis Commercial Appeal, May 1, 1903)

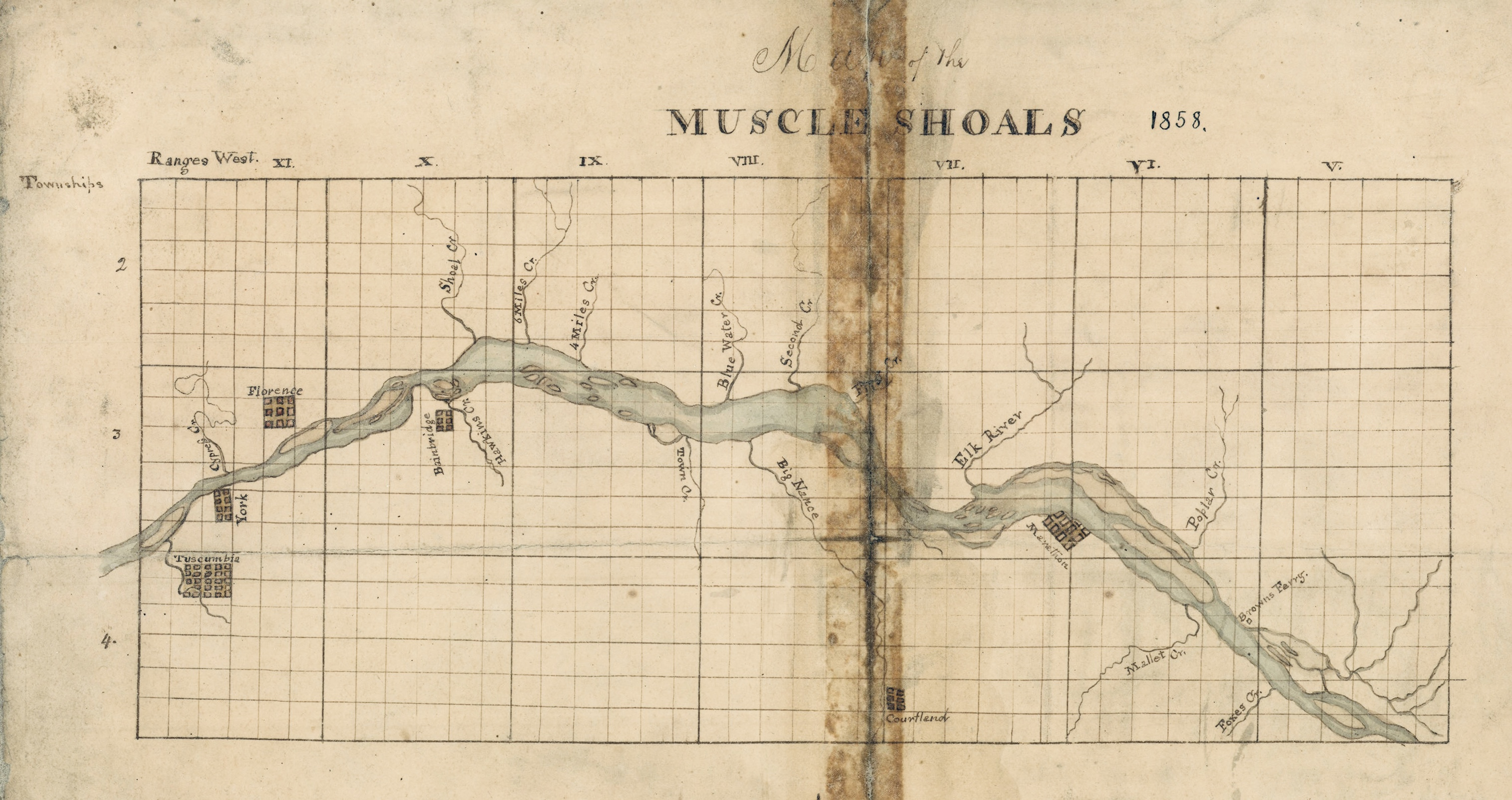
This hand-colored map of the Muscle Shoals section of the Tennessee River has been in the Tennessee State Library and Archives since 1858; it shows Florence, Courtland, and Tuscumbia, as well as Andrew Jackson's planned but unrealized towns, York, Bainbridge, and Marathon, Alabama (Tennessee Virtual Archive 42391)

Andrew Jackson, who became the seventh U.S. president in 1828, was personally involved in land speculation in Tennessee and Alabama. His military expeditions and presidential policies led to the dispossession and expulsion of Indigenous people from the southeastern United States, which in some cases benefitted land speculators. According to biographer Robert V. Remini, Jackson's engagement with real estate investment started early in his life and continued "almost to the moment of his death," although historians have no clear insight into how profitable it was for him or even the full extent of his involvement.

Andrew Jackson and many of his friends and business partners of long standing, supplemented by a veritable cavalcade of aides-de-camp and junior officers collected during the War of 1812, were closely associated in these land cessions and subsequent speculative investments in Alabama, Mississippi, and, following the First Seminole War launched by Andrew Jackson, in Florida.

Regarding an early 18th-century land speculation involving Jackson's father-in-law John Donelson and other early pioneers of the Cumberland with whom Jackson was familiar, historian A. P. Whitaker wrote in 1926 that their efforts demonstrated "to what an amazing extent public office was exploited by government officials of both high and low degree to forward their interests in western lands." Gordon T. Chappell, a historian of the U.S. South, wrote in 1949 that "the role played by land speculation in bringing about the rapid development of a frontier region is nowhere more clearly seen than in that part of the Tennessee Valley which was acquired from the Indians in the Creek wars or in the eastern part of Mississippi where the land was made available for sale by the Treaty of Dancing Rabbit and the Chickasaw Treaty which provided for removal of the Indians." Land speculators was a driving force in western settlement, for good or for ill; as historian Thomas D. Clark outlined in 1939: "Their representatives traveled through the East, England, and Europe with beautifully drawn maps and thriving villages which existed only on paper. Many disappointed purchasers arrived in the West to find screaming panthers, canebrakes, and spring branches instead of humming and bustling cities and open rivers." In one 1977 study of a multigenerational westward expansion that was in lockstep with the physical and colonial progress of their Nashville neighbor Andrew Jackson, historian Nicholas Perkins Hardeman wrote, "...man was the commanding element [that] mastered the wilderness and that, in any explanation of American history, capitalism, industrial labor, urban development, the plantation, and other institutions, must not be pushed into the background. Free land was supposed to have had almost magical powers. [Per Frederick Jackson Turner,] 'The most significant thing about the American frontier is that it lies at the hither edge of free land.'"

== Personal investments ==
Speculation was a family affair, almost from the first; in 1798, Jackson wrote his brother-in-law Robert Hays about land on the Duck River, advising him to "keep all you have and get what you can."

His most momentous early speculation may have been a partnership with a North Carolinian named David Allison, which failed, leaving Jackson with years of substantial debts. Decades after the fact, a frustrated third party to the deal, Andrew Erwin, became a leading opponent of Jackson's 1828 presidential run.

Jackson also participated in what was known as "Alabama fever," which yielded the Alabama real estate bubble of the 1810s. According to Alabama memoirist James Saunders, Jackson was the force behind the Treaty of Turkeytown for purposes of real estate investment. Saunders wrote in the 1880s that Jackson sent Lewis Dillahunty, a 22-year-old officer from his Battle of New Orleans army, to northern Alabama on his behalf: "Early in 1816 Dillahunty and his young wife located the place called Courtland. Whether he was an Indian agent or a confidential emissary of the government, I have not been able to ascertain. A constant correspondence passed between Mr. Monroe and him. He made himself very popular with the Indians, and in 1817, when his patron, General Jackson, attempted to purchase all the Cherokee lands, he succeeded in getting that part occupied by the Indians (Morgan, Lawrence and Franklin counties), through the personal influence of Major Dillahunty."

Courtland was "laid out on the site of a Cherokee town, and was surrounded by old fields, on which Indian cabins were still standing when I first saw it, in 1821. The mound builders had been there before the Cherokee, and left on the west side of the creek one of their largest monuments." Courtland survived as a town, but the villages or paper towns of Bainbridge and Melton's Bluff vanished off the map in short order. According to Saunders, "The General thought a town above the shoals must succeed, whilst his relative, John Donelson, my father [Rev. Turner Saunders], and others, thought that Bainbridge, at the foot of the shoals, was the very site for a large town, and they cut a broad canal through the river bottom, for a mile, to the foot of the prospective town. Neither Melton's Bluff or Bainbridge was a success. There are no remains of a town at either place." Investors in the Muscle Shoal Land Company South of Tennessee River, which sought to develop Bainbridge, included Lemuel Donelson, Robert Weakley, Beverly Reese, Charles Boyles, Levi J. Gist, Turner Saunders, John Donelson, and Robert P. Currin (also an investor in the Salt Lick reservation in west Tennessee).

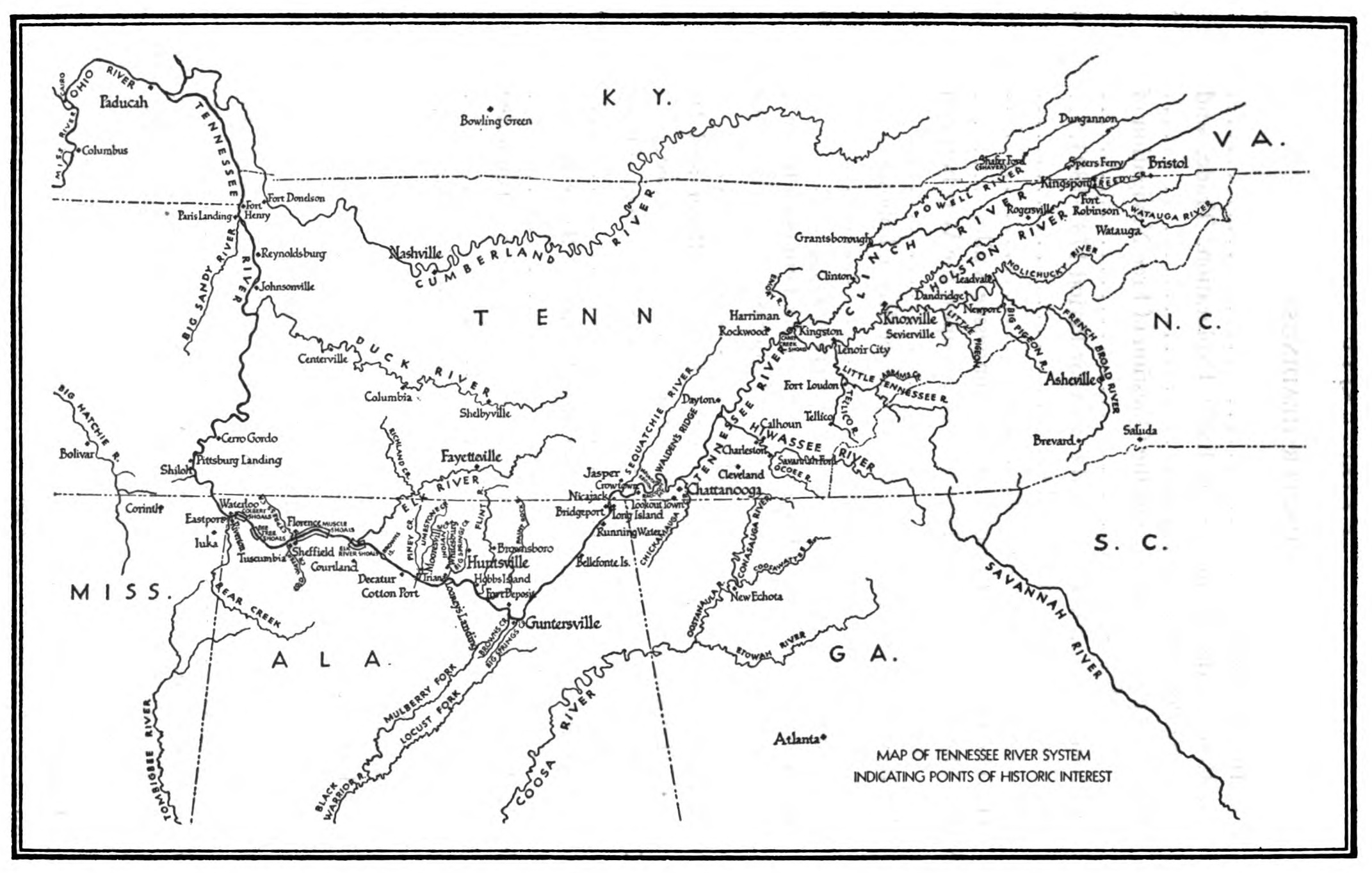
Map of Tennessee River system indicating points of historic interest (1937)

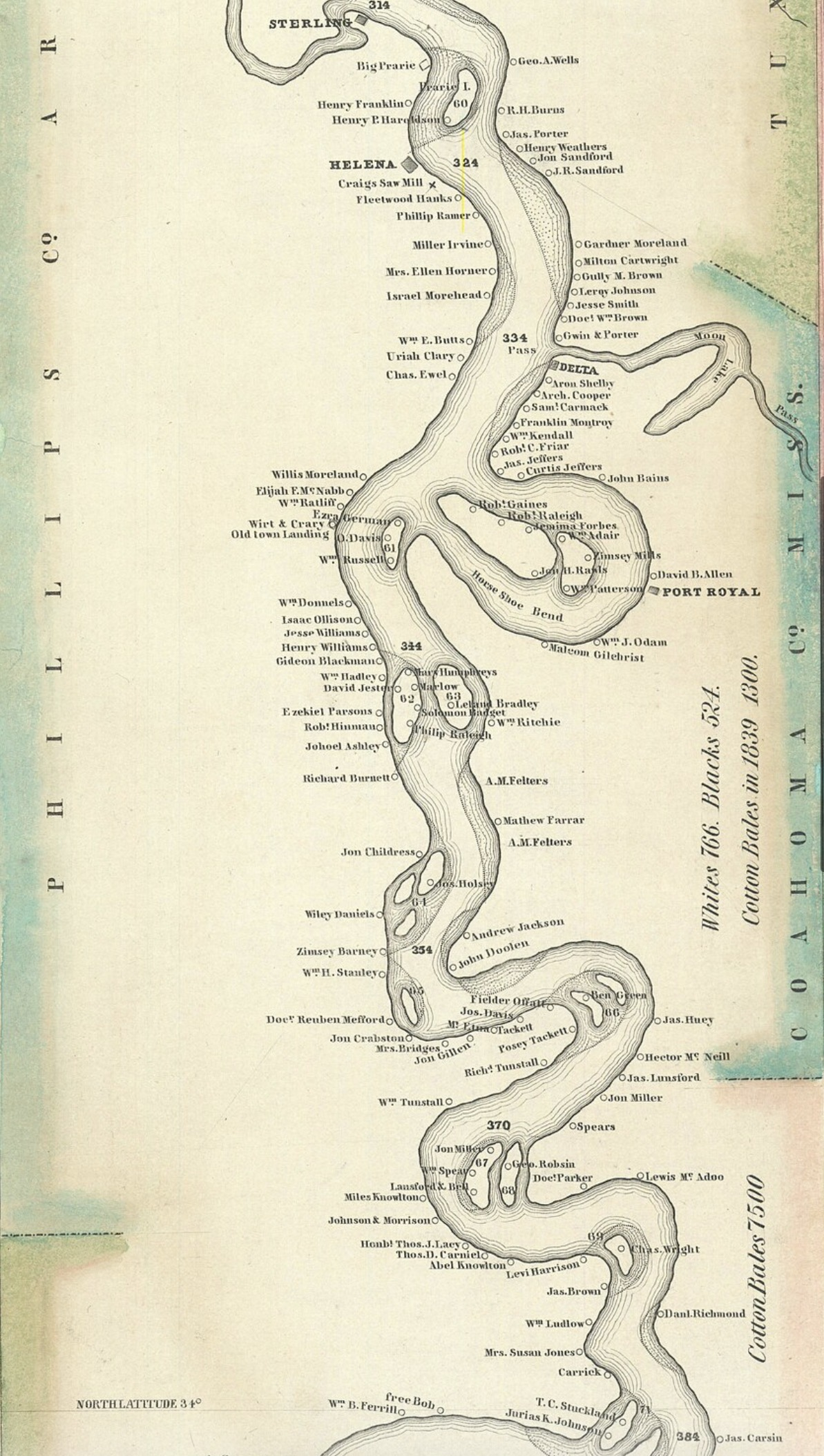
Andrew Jackson and his son Andrew Jackson Jr. co-owned Halcyon plantation, in Coahoma County, Mississippi, from 1838 until Jackson's death in 1845 (Detail of Homo-Graphic Chart of the Settlements on the Mississippi River, 1842)

Melton's Bluff was later renamed Marathon, Alabama; in pitching the area as the possible site for a U.S. armory, John Coffee wrote that "The produce of East Tennessee, the western part of Virginia, North Carolina, and Georgia, and the eastern part of North Alabama, all descend the Tennessee river to market, and pass over the Muscle shoals in large flat boats from 50 to 80 ft long, and from 15 to 18 feet wide, drawing from 2 feet to 2 feet 6 inches water; these boats commence running through the Muscle shoals at the rise of water in the fall, or early part of winter in each year, most generally about the last of December, and continue to run until May, and sometimes June. The Muscle shoals have been ascended with small keel-boats from Campbell's Ferry [Bainbridge] to Marathon, carrying from 10 to 20 tons burden. There is a boat at this time at Marathon that has plied the last year on that part of the river with some success, but she is navigated by an experienced and very skilful man, Isaac Brownlow." Isaac Brownlow was an uncle of the Fighting Parson.

Jackson was partners with John Overton in developing what was called the Fourth Chickasaw Bluff and laying out a town called Memphis, Tennessee. He sold most of his stake to James Winchester and John Christmas McLemore, and sold his remaining 1/8th interest in 1823, in anticipation of his first presidential run.

According to the American Guide to Alabama published by the Federal Writers' Project in 1941, Jackson was also involved in a laying out a place called York's Bluff near what is now Sheffield: "Andrew Jackson and his 'right hand,' John Coffee, with time heavy on their hands after the defeat of the Creek Confederacy and the British at New Orleans, started the speculative history of the town in 1816 by buying much of the land here. In 1820 General Coffee surveyed and promoted a town called York Bluff. A few houses were built, but the place was soon abandoned in favor of Tuscumbia."

== Indian treaties and land companies ==
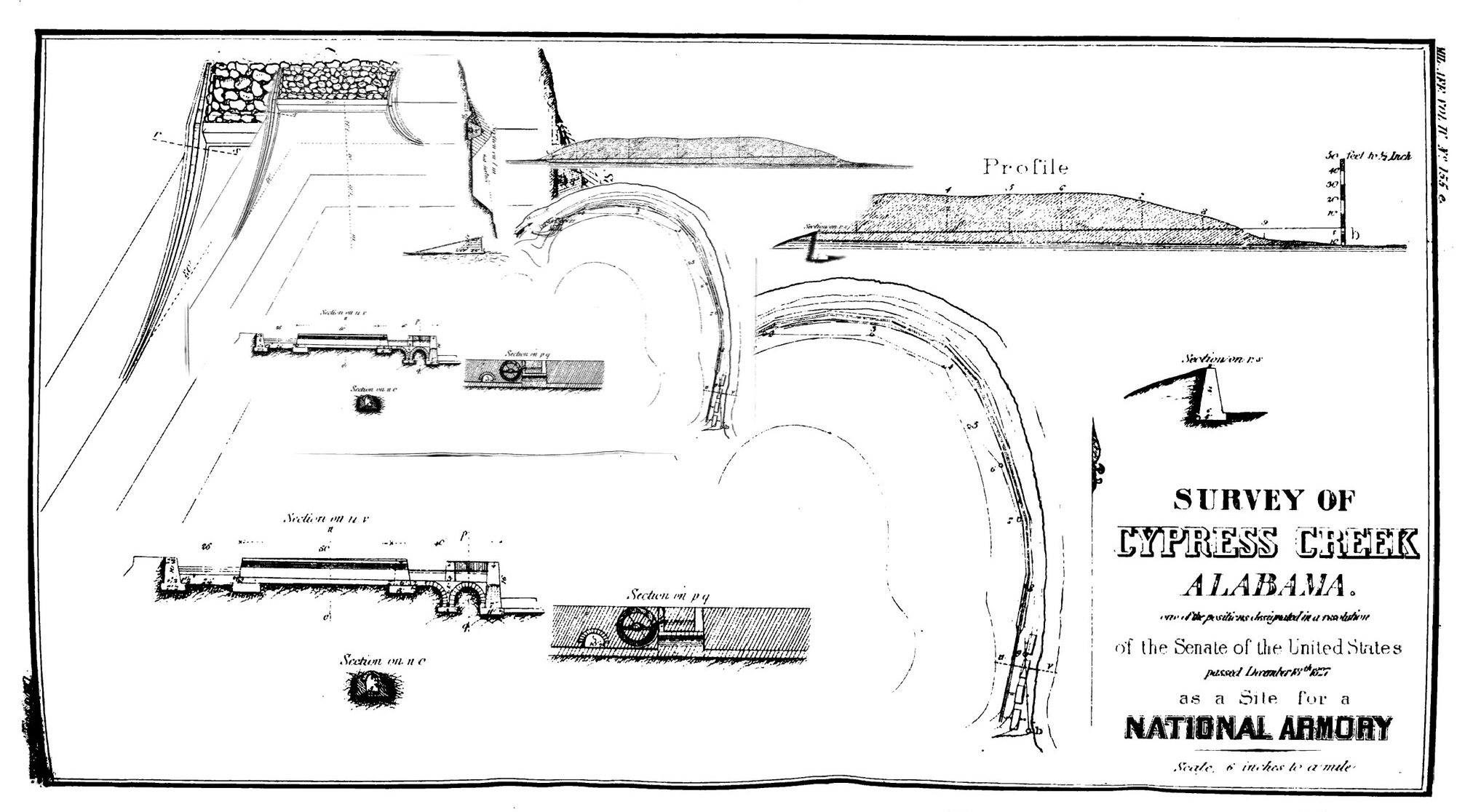
Jackson promoted northern Alabama as a possible location for U.S. National Armory, and the site was surveyed by the government multiple times

According an 1891 history, the settlers who came to Tennessee in the late 18th century, such as Jackson, were believed by Spanish colonial administrators and Indigenous people to have imperial designs on the lands to the west. Haywood wrote, "...the settlers on the western waters were of that warlike character as already to manifest an inordinate ambition and vast projects for conquering all the countries on the eastern shore of the Mississippi." As Virginians and North Carolinians poured into the future Tennessee, in many cases squatting on unceded land, the Cherokee and Creek defended themselves with lethal violence; the settlers sought help from the U.S. government but Secretary of War Henry Knox wrote William Blount, "...it is not to be supposed that [the United States] will support the expenses of a war brought on the frontiers by the wanton blood thirsty disposition of our own people."

Jackson was a U.S. Indian commissioner in the 1810s and 1820s, negotiating with the Southern tribes for land cessions by treaty, and seeking profit on the same: "Andrew Jackson, himself a large speculator in this land, was determined to use the power and prestige of his victories to free the South of Indians." He did so with an eye to profit for both his personal network and his nation-state, writing to James Monroe in October 1816, after concluding two treaties at the convention of the Southern tribes at George Colbert's home and tavern in September 1816, that the sale of the newly ceded lands "...will bring into the treasury immense sums of money". However profitable, Jackson thought that treaties with the Indigenous were "an absurdity," corresponding with Monroe in March 1817 and asking (rhetorically) "...is it not absurd for the sovereign to negotiate by treaty with the subject?"

Charles G. Sellers noted in a 1954 paper that Jackson was closely associated land speculators throughout his life, but that he failed to capitalize effectively on this network: "It is perhaps remarkable that a man who was intimate with William Blount, John Overton, William Polk, John C. McLemore, and others whose acquisitions ran into the hundreds of thousands of acres, should have made such meager use of his opportunities." Arda Walker argued in 1943 that Jackson's "meager use of his opportunities" was predominantly a skill issue: "...being a planter was of the highest importance to Jackson. It does not mean that he made his greatest success in this field...He did not make as brilliant a success in farming as some of his neighbors. He lived in too high a manner for that." In his 2013 biography, Andrew Jackson, Southerner, historian Mark R. Cheathem wrote, "Historian Charles Sellers once argued that after 1804 'never again was Jackson to engage in any considerable speculative venture.' The facts do not bear out this claim. Jackson speculated widely in land during the 1810s in an effort to benefit himself. Given his direct involvement in land seizures during the 1810s and his subsequent correspondence about prospects in Alabama, Florida, and the Mississippi Territory, it stretches credulity to imagine that he did not calculate these moves to help his land-speculating associates turn a profit as well." This was also the position of Cherokee emissaries The Ridge, John Walker, John Ross, Richard Taylor, and Cheucunnessee (Young Dragging Canoe) when they met with James Madison and William H. Crawford at Washington, D.C. in 1816: "When they discussed their claim to the land south of the Tennessee River, the Cherokees were blunt in pointing out that Jackson, Coffee, and other Tennesseans had ulterior motives in claiming that land: 'The spirit of gain urges them, the laurel of popularity prompts them' to 'make crooked talks' and 'like the serpent, speak with a split tongue.' There was little doubt that Jackson and his friends were heavily engaged in speculation over the ceded land because it was extremely valuable."

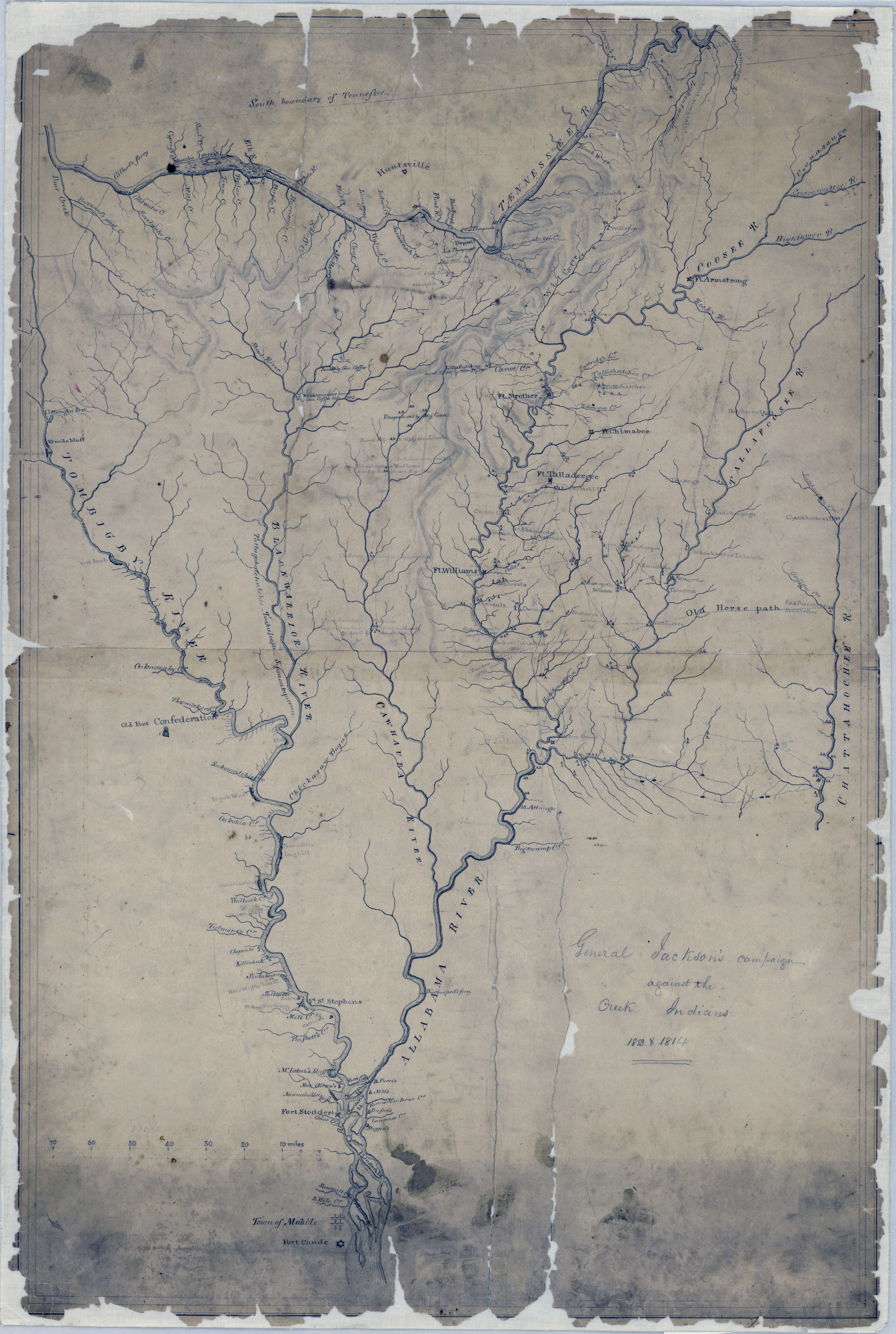
"General Jackson's campaign against the Creek Indians 1813 & 1814," showing the Muscle Shoals of the Tennessee River and the Alabama River watershed (NAID 102279378)

Another issue was Jackson's role in deceptively soliciting land cessions from tribes with conflicting claims to the same land. For instance, per historian R. S. Cotterill, in January 1816, "The pseudo commissioner [John Coffee] went to Fort Strother in the middle of January and, after waiting a week for the other commissioners who, he alleged with evident falsity, had promised to meet him there, proceeded to run the line where certain 'Creek chiefs and Headmen,' collected by himself, told him it should be. His line from the mouth of Will's Creek on the Coosa to Coosada Island in the Tennessee, down the Tennessee to Caney Creek, 15 miles below the Shoals, thence by Gaines' Trace to Cotton Gin Port on the Tombigbee, enclosed in the ceded territory practically all the land claimed by the Cherokees and Chickasaws south of the Tennessee and was therefore highly pleasing to Jackson, who encouraged, as he no doubt instigated, the entire proceeding." As it happened, "The line that Coffee ran in January and February 1816 naturally followed the wishes of Jackson, including within the cession the 2.2 million acres claimed by the Cherokees."

Following the 1816 treaties with the Chickasaw and Cherokee, John Coffee, who has been described as a "simple, brave, and modest man" who was "absolutely devoted" to Andrew Jackson, was appointed to be surveyor general for the "lands of the United States in the northern part of Alabama Territory." The Cypress Land Company, incorporated by Coffee and James Jackson and others, developed Florence, Alabama. Andrew Jackson was among the stockholders. Jackson's successor, Martin Van Buren, appointed one of the partners in the Cypress Land Company, John McKinley, to the U.S. Supreme Court in 1837. According to Clarence E. Carter, editor of The Territorial Papers of the United States, a number of Jackson-affiliated and/or Donelson family members were irregularly hired by Coffee, Jackson's long-time partner and in-law, to survey tracts along the Tennessee River:

"There are no surveying contracts extant for Alabama Territory which supply data on the specific tract or tracts to be surveyed, nor the time within which the work should be completed as in the case, for example, of Michigan Territory. Cf. Terr. Papers (Mich.), X, 527–530. Apparently the surveyors operated under informal instructions from the surveyor general. As for Freeman's district, in southern Alabama, no contracts of any kind have been uncovered. A comparison of the above form with all others issued and signed by Coffee for the years 1817 to 1819 inclusive discloses no textual deviations. A comparison of the above form with all others issued and signed by Coffee for the years 1817 to 1819 inclusive discloses no textual deviations. The following additional contracts have been noted: For the year 1817, under dates of Apr. 26, William Donelson, John Donelson, John S. Doxy, May 6, Charles Bright, William Jones, Hunter Peel, May 7, James Blackemore, Henry M. Johnson, Samuel Bell, James Bright, Benjamin Clements, Isham G. Searcy, Benjamin Harris, William P. Anderson, May 8, William J. Adair, Ralph Graves, Leroy May, Daniel Gilbert, Robert M. McCombs, Constant Hardeman, May 9, James W. Exum, James W. Hoggatt, James Vaulx, James H. Weakley, William R. Peyton, Thomas J. Hardiman, May 10, David Mitchell, Robert Harris, May 11, Moses Woodfin, Alexander McCulloch, David Hubbard, May 12, William Harris, May 14, John Hutchings, May 21, Ferdinand Sannoner, May 23, Richard McMahon, George Peery, May 26, Henry Minor, Samuel Steele, May 30, Thomas L. Butler, June 2, William Killingsworth, John Bryan, June 5, James Paterson, June 8, Benjamin F. Smith, Aug. 4, Greene K. Hubbard, Malcolm Gilchrist, and Aug. 13, John Ralston. For the year 1818, under dates of Mar. 10, Hardy Clements, Mar. 25, Lugars W. Lemore, James Mitchell, Apr. 7, James Patterson, Malcolm Gilchrist, Greene K. Hubbard, John Ralston, Apr. 15, Thomas Hutchings, Apr. 16, Jeremiah Doxy, John McCutchan, Apr. 28, Simpson Harris, May 3, John McGregor, June 13, William Lawrence, June 18, Absolom Weir, July 7, Alexander Ewing, July 10, John C. Coffee, and Oct. 18, James P. Sneed. For the year 1819, under dates of Feb. 7, Henry Washington, William C. Mead, Aps. 5, Truborn G. Jones, Apr. 11, Samuel Bigham, Aug. 24, John Gilmore, John Gilmon, Christopher C. Stone, Sept. 11, Charles M. Lawson, and Nov. 4, Thomas Rhodes.

One of these men, John Samuel "Jacky" Donelson, a ward of Andrew Jackson and oldest son of Jackson's brother-in-law, the late Samuel Donelson, and Polly Smith (daughter of U.S. Senator Daniel Smith) was just 20 years old when he "was struck ill and died...while on a surveying expedition into the Alabama wilderness in 1817."

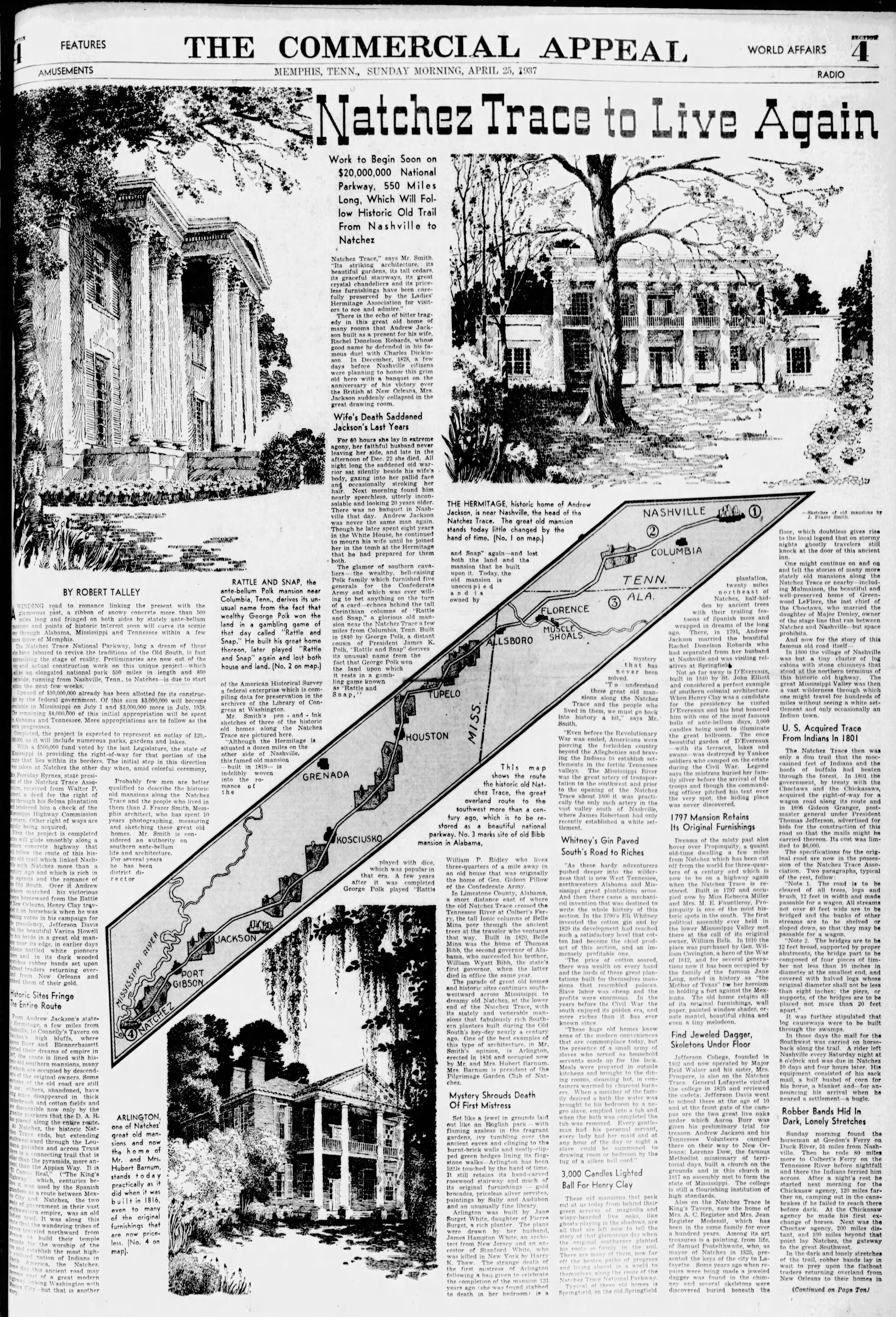
"Natchez Trace to Live Again" newspaper feature article on the Natchez Trace Parkway, which crosses the Tennessee River near Florence and Muscle Shoals; the mapped town of Grenada is the approximate location of the Chocchuma land office, and the Mount Salus/Clinton land office was along the Trace west of Jackson, Mississippi (Memphis Commercial Appeal, 1937)

The editors of The Papers of Andrew Jackson devote two full pages to an analysis of Jackson's involvement in Alabama land development, noting, for instance that he "never obtained more than an Indian title to the Melton's Bluff plantation" on the Muscle Shoals that he owned between 1816 and 1827, and that "Jackson was not shy about pressing the claims of his friends for posts that would be important in the development of the new territory," but ultimately concluding that the "surviving evidence shows that Jackson was highly interested in the development of Alabama and that he was at least a minor participant in the land boom in which many of his closest colleagues were deeply involved, but little more." Among the colleagues who benefitted financially, even if Jackson himself did not, was John Coffee, who stood "at the center of all this activity...ready to capitalize on the speculation boon about to occur. From his land office, Coffee began the process of entering detailed notes on the quality of the surveyed land and making arrangements with land-office clerks to get a kickback on any land or money they received for purchasing, locating, or giving information about land—all common practices of the day...When sales of the Alabama land began in 1818, Coffee entered 83 tracts in his own name, comprising 16,000 acres. He moved his family to Alabama and eventually became that state's most wealthy land speculator and planter." Many primary sources on "Alabama fever" burned when a suspected arson fire gutted the combined Huntsville land office/Cypress Land Company building on December 21, 1827.

Also, James Jackson and his son James Jackson Jr. and his brother John Jackson (no familial relation to the President, but a business relationship dating back decades), Jackson's nephew John Donelson, John McCrea, John C. McLemore, John H. Eaton (Jackson's Secretary of War from 1829 to 1831), and Thomas Childress (erstwhile proprietor of Nashville's Bell Tavern), had bought land on Pensacola in the winter of 1817–18. Andrew Jackson launched his invasion that became the First Seminole War in early 1818. In February 1819 Congressional investigation "chaired by Abner Lacock had suggested that their investment had influenced Jackson's occupation of the town in May 1818, a charge that Jackson vehemently denied." Specifically, Jackson threatened to "cut off Abner Laycock's ears." John Williams, U.S. Senator from Tennessee, and Jesse Benton, brother of future U.S. Senator Thomas Hart Benton, were among those making the claim that Jackson invaded Florida and claimed it for the United States to increase the value of land he owned in the capital city of West Florida. In the 1830s, President Jackson instigated a feud with Congressman Davy Crockett and Senator George Poindexter when he tried to appoint his nephew Stockley D. Hays to be surveyor general in charge of newly ceded lands in Mississippi.

== Treaty side deals ==
"Wishing to give a national mark of gratitude to Major General Andrew Jackson, for his distinguished services rendered at the head of the army from Tennessee, we give and grant to him, and his heirs, forever, three miles square of land, at such place as he may select, out of the retained lands." (Treaty of Fort Jackson, American State Papers—Indian Affairs, volume 1, page 838)

Indian treaties of the era seemingly often benefitted Jackson or close allies, sometimes via curious set-asides, variously described as bribes, allotments, reservations, and gifts. Per Cheathem, "It is unclear whether these land grants were true gifts, desperate bribes, or sarcastic gestures; regardless, Congress refused to allow them."

Before signing the 1814 Treaty of Fort Jackson, the Creek chiefs offered gifts of land to Jackson, U.S. Indian agent Benjamin Hawkins, and to two interpreters, George Mayfield and Alexander Cornells. Hawkins, in accepting his gift, stated that the Americans had not solicited these land grants but that they had come from the kindness of the Creek leaders.

In 1816 the House of Representatives Committee on Public Lands "recommended against confirmation of Cherokee land grants" to Jackson, Benjamin Hawkins, and Alexander Cornells.

The salt lick reserve included in the U.S.–Chickasaw 1818 Treaty of Tuscaloosa, also repudiated by Congress, was controversial into Jackson's second term as president.

Side bargains conducted amidst treaty-making went both ways: "Oftentimes Jackson used 'small presents' as 'the sole remedy' to overcoming Indian resistance to negotiation. These bribes helped him complete four treaties that resulted in additional millions of acres being added to the United States in the present-day states of Alabama, Georgia, Kentucky, Mississippi, Missouri, and Tennessee." Jackson seemingly considered this the nature of his diplomatic business as Indian commissioner plenipotentiary; just for example, negotiations with the Chickasaw in 1816–1818 included a US$4,500 (equivalent to $94,647 in 2025) payment to Levi Colbert "to be paid into my hands as a compensation for any improvements which individuals of the Chickasaw Nation may have had on the lands surrendered to the United States agreeable to the Treaty made by Major General Andrew Jackson." Jackson himself stated, regarding this instance, that "presents offered to the influential chiefs, amounting to $4500, to be paid on the success of the negotiations...seemed to produce some sensible effect."

== Public policies ==
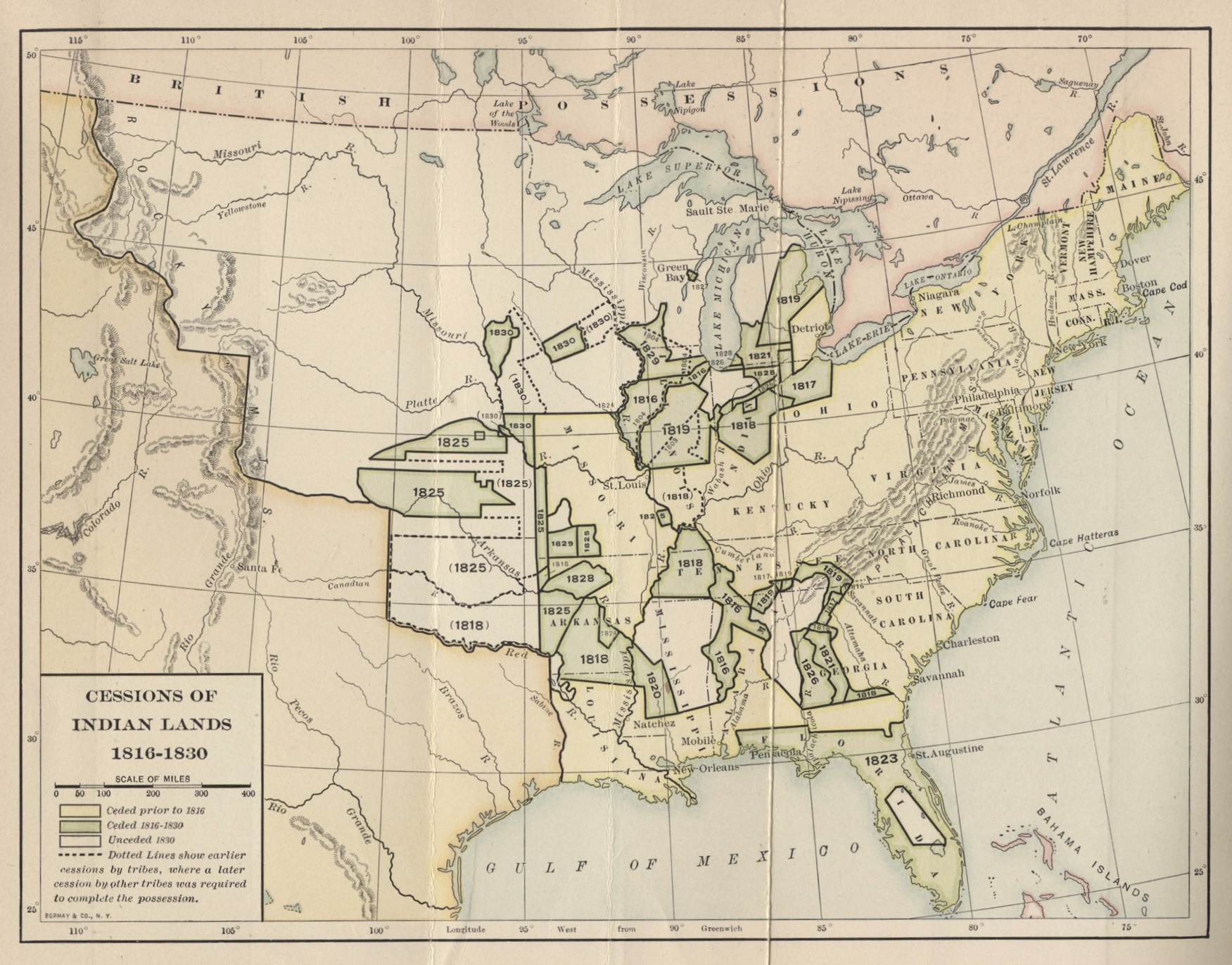
"Cessions of Indian lands, 1816–1830" (The American Nation, 1910)

Indigeous people who signed removal treaties with the U.S. government found themselves subject to the depredations of land speculators. In 1816 a Cherokee named Richard Riley who lived near the Creek Path reported to the delegation in Washington "that 'hundreds' of intruders had rushed into [northern Alabama] as soon as they knew Coffee had surveyed it, expecting to pick up land at the preemption price of $2 per acre that on the open market would be worth $20 per acre. Coffee and Jackson had encouraged such an invasion to make it difficult for Madison and Crawford to sustain the Cherokees' claim to it. To do this, the government would now have to remove these intruders at heavy costs in army action and voter reaction." In 2016, another historian wrote that Jacksonland, the title of a book about Cherokee dispossession, was accurate in that "the United States is Andrew Jackson's country, a nation born in violent conquest. The early republic did not expand naturally into empty western lands. People like Jackson created the United States from the territory of other nations. The essence of American national identity lies not only in the high-minded principles of the Revolution, but in the volatile mixture of aggressive capitalism, white supremacy, and violence epitomized by Old Hickory. Who better to adorn the twenty-dollar bill?"

In 1830, Stockley D. Hays, a nephew and loyal lieutenant of Jackson for over 25 years wrote the President to warn him that "...many of our good orderly, but enterprising citizens intend forthwith, to move over on to the Chickisaw lands to procure occupant claims—There is a treaty stipulation to prevent this procedure—Untill the U States troops can arrive, Would it not be well to issue your proclamation on the subject—to prevent the great mischief which may otherwise ensue." Jackson sent a message to his Secretary of War, but ultimately, no U.S. forces were sent to protect the Chickasaw from squatters.

A similar situation occurred within the pre-Removal Creek Nation of Alabama and Georgia, with malfeasance so widespread that land speculators were accused of instigating the Second Creek War (essentially an intratribal civil war with U.S. government participation). Creek people legally dispossessed but not yet expelled from their lands found themselves inundated with "speculators who rushed to possess native farms before the hearths had cooled and who preyed on starving families during their final desperate months in the South."

== Other ==
- In September 1787, the same month he got his law license, Jackson acquired two tracts of land from Stockley Donelson.
- Jackson's eventual brother-in-law Stockley Donelson was implicated in the Glasgow land frauds case; Donelson's father-in-law was North Carolina Secretary of State James Glasgow. The Glasgow land frauds "swindled hundreds of Revolutionary War veterans out of the land grants awarded to them as pensions for their military service." Donelson was described by NCpedia as "the most active, charming, accommodating, cunning, and indefatigable practitioner of fraud and deceit to be found in the state service." Allegedly, in approximately 1797, while Jackson was serving as a Representative to Congress, Founding Father, former North Carolina governor, and U.S. Senator Alexander Martin brought up Donelson's connection to the Glasgow land frauds, in response to which Jackson "charged the Legislature, Executive and Citizens of North-Carolina, at a public dining table, with being a set of Rogues and Rascals, and challenged the Governor to a duel." Martin verbally deescalated the situation.
- Some of Jackson's later Indian treaties may have opened lands to which his friends from North Carolina held "grants," such as lands north of the Chickasaw Bluffs (in what became Dyer County) which were claimed by Jackson familiars including his law teacher John Stokes, Ezekiel Polk, Hardy Murfree, Reading Blount, John Gray Blount, Wm. T. Lewis, William Hawkins, and Archibald Murphey.
- A 1808 pioneer settlement on the Garrison Fork of Duck River was supposedly arranged by "obtaining land titles through Andrew Jackson, the attorney for Andrew Erwin's landed estates in Tennessee."
- Jackson seems to have assisted at least one other friend in making financially lucrative land buys. William Smith, who was a U.S. Senator from South Carolina, and who had attended the same Waxhaws Presbyterian-run cottage school as Jackson, was tipped off by Jackson to buy land along the Tennessee River in the future Alabama Territory "before the initial cessions of land by the Cherokee and Creek Indians."

== See also ==
- Early career of Andrew Jackson
- Andrew Jackson and the slave trade
- Bibliography of Andrew Jackson
- Blount conspiracy (1797)
- Burr conspiracy (1805–1806)
- Rhea letter (1817–1831)
- Jackson's Military Road (1816–1820)
- John Brahan
- Archibald Yell
- Samuel Gwin
- Paddy Carr
- Carey A. Harris
- Irish Bend

== Sources ==
- Atkinson, James R. (2010). Splendid Land, Splendid People: The Chickasaw Indians to Removal. Tuscaloosa: University of Alabama Press. ISBN 978-0-8173-8337-4. LCCN 2003008300. OCLC 636860807. Project MUSE book 22558.
- Carter, Clarence Edwin, ed. (1952). The Territorial Papers of the United States, Volume XVIII: The Territory of Alabama, 1817–1819. The Territorial Papers of the United States. National Archives and Records Administration. Washington, D.C.: U.S. Government Printing Office. LCCN 35026191. OCLC 1157716. OL 8078771W. Publication No. 11-52.
- Chappell, Gordon T. (November 1949). "Some Patterns of Land Speculation in the Old Southwest". The Journal of Southern History. 15 (4): 463–477. doi:10.2307/2198383. JSTOR 2198383.
- Cheathem, Mark R. (2014). Andrew Jackson, Southerner. Baton Rouge, Louisiana: Louisiana State University Press. ISBN 978-0-8071-5099-3. LCCN 2012049695. OCLC 858995561. Project MUSE book 26506.
- Clark, Thomas Dionysius (1939). The rampaging frontier; manners and humors of pioneer days in the South and the middle West. Indianapolis & New York: The Bobbs-Merrill Company. LCCN 39010115. OCLC 2057074.
- Drew, Bettina Lee (December 2001). Master Andrew Jackson: Indian Removal and the Culture of Slavery (Thesis). Yale University. UMI 3030759. ProQuest 3030759
- Ellisor, John T. (2010). The Second Creek War: Interethnic Conflict and Collusion on a Collapsing Frontier. Indians of the Southeast. Lincoln, Nebraska: University of Nebraska Press. ISBN 978-0-8032-2548-0. LCCN 2010009967. OCLC 701719679. Project MUSE book 1494.
- Harlan, Louis R. (March 1948). "Public Career of William Berkeley Lewis". Tennessee Historical Quarterly. 7 (1): 3–37. ISSN 0040-3261. JSTOR 42620964.
- Hardeman, Nicholas Perkins (1977). Wilderness Calling: The Hardeman Family in the American Westward Movement, 1750–1900. Knoxville, Tennessee: University of Tennessee Press. ISBN 978-0-87049-194-8. LCCN 76000980. OCLC 2005980 – via Internet Archive.
- Jackson, Andrew (1994). Moser, Harold; Hoth, David; Hoemann, George (eds.). The Papers of Andrew Jackson: Volume IV, 1816–1820. University of Tennessee Press. doi:10.7290/utp8684. ISBN 978-0-87049-778-0.
- Kanon, Tom (2014). Tennesseans at War, 1812–1815: Andrew Jackson, the Creek War, and the Battle of New Orleans. Tuscaloosa: University of Alabama Press. ISBN 9780817318291. LCCN 2013049815. OCLC 900093586. Project MUSE book 30812.
- Keith, LeeAnna (2008). The Colfax Massacre: The Untold Story of Black Power, White Terror, and the Death of Reconstruction. New York: Oxford University Press. ISBN 978-0-19-531026-9. LCCN 2007023368. OCLC 191027904.
- McDonald, William Lindsey (1995). "Melton's Bluff: Andrew Jackson's Cotton Plantation at the Muscle Shoals". Essays on the History of the Shoals from Pioneer Days to World War II. The Journal of Muscle Shoals History. 14. Sheffield, Alabama: Tennessee Valley Historical Society: 3–18. ISSN 0094-8039. OCLC 1795446.
- McLoughlin, William Gerald (2018) [1986]. Cherokee Renascence in the New Republic (ebook ed.). Princeton, N.J.: Princeton University Press. ISBN 978-0-691-04741-6. JSTOR j.ctv39x611. LCCN 86042843. OCLC 13859438. OL 2129522W. Project MUSE book 61052.
- Ray, Kristofer (Fall 2002). "Land Speculation, Popular Democracy, and Political Transformation on the Tennessee Frontier, 1780–1800". Tennessee Historical Quarterly. 61 (3): 161–181. ISSN 0040-3261. JSTOR 42627701.
- Remini, Robert V. (1977). Andrew Jackson and the Course of American Empire, 1767–1821. New York: Harper & Row. ISBN 978-0-8018-5912-0. LCCN 77003766. OCLC 1145801830.
- Rice, Turner (1975a). "Andrew Jackson and His Northwest Alabama Interests". Journal of Muscle Shoals History. 3 (5). ISSN 0094-8039. LCCN 74646773. OCLC 1795446.
- ——— (1975b). "The Cypress Land Company: A Dream of Empire". Journal of Muscle Shoals History. 3. University of North Alabama. Florence, Alabama: Tennessee Valley Historical Society: 21–35. ISSN 0094-8039. LCCN 74646773. OCLC 1795446.
- Roberts, Frances C.; Reidy, Thomas E. (2019). The Founding of Alabama: Background and Formative Period in the Great Bend and Madison County. Tuscaloosa: The University of Alabama Press. ISBN 978-0-8173-2043-0. LCCN 2019018459. OCLC 1133266247. Project MUSE book 72323.
- Robinson, Dan M. (1967). "Robert Hays, Unsung Pioneer of the Cumberland, Country". Tennessee Historical Quarterly. 26 (3): 263–278. ISSN 0040-3261. JSTOR 42622953.
- Saunt, Claudio (2000). "Taking Account of Property: Stratification among the Creek Indians in the Early Nineteenth Century". The William and Mary Quarterly. 57 (4): 733–760. doi:10.2307/2674154. ISSN 0043-5597. JSTOR 2674154.
- ——— (2020). Unworthy Republic: The Dispossession of Native Americans and the Road to Indian Territory. New York: W. W. Norton & Company. ISBN 978-0-393-60984-4. LCCN 2019050502. OCLC 1102470806.
- Sellers, Charles G. (June 1954). "Banking and Politics in Jackson's Tennessee, 1817–1827". The Mississippi Valley Historical Review. 41 (1): 61–84. doi:10.2307/1898150. JSTOR 1898150.
- Spence, Richard Douglas (Summer 2010). "Samuel Donelson: Young Andrew Jackson's Best Friend". Tennessee Historical Quarterly. 69 (2). Tennessee Historical Society: 106–123. ISSN 0040-3261. JSTOR 42628170.
- Walker, Arda (1943). "Andrew Jackson; Planter". The East Tennessee Historical Society's Publications. 15: 19–34. ISSN 0361-6193. LCCN 29013045. OCLC 39989616. FHL 1345525.
- Whitaker, A. P. (December 1926). "The Muscle Shoals Speculation, 1783–1789". The Mississippi Valley Historical Review. 13 (3): 365–386. doi:10.2307/1893112. JSTOR 1893112.
- Writers' Program of the Work Projects Administration (1941). Alabama: A Guide to the Deep South. American Guide Series. Alabama State Planning Commission. New York: Hastings House.
