= Salt Lick Reservation controversy =

Chickasaw treaty grant in Tennessee

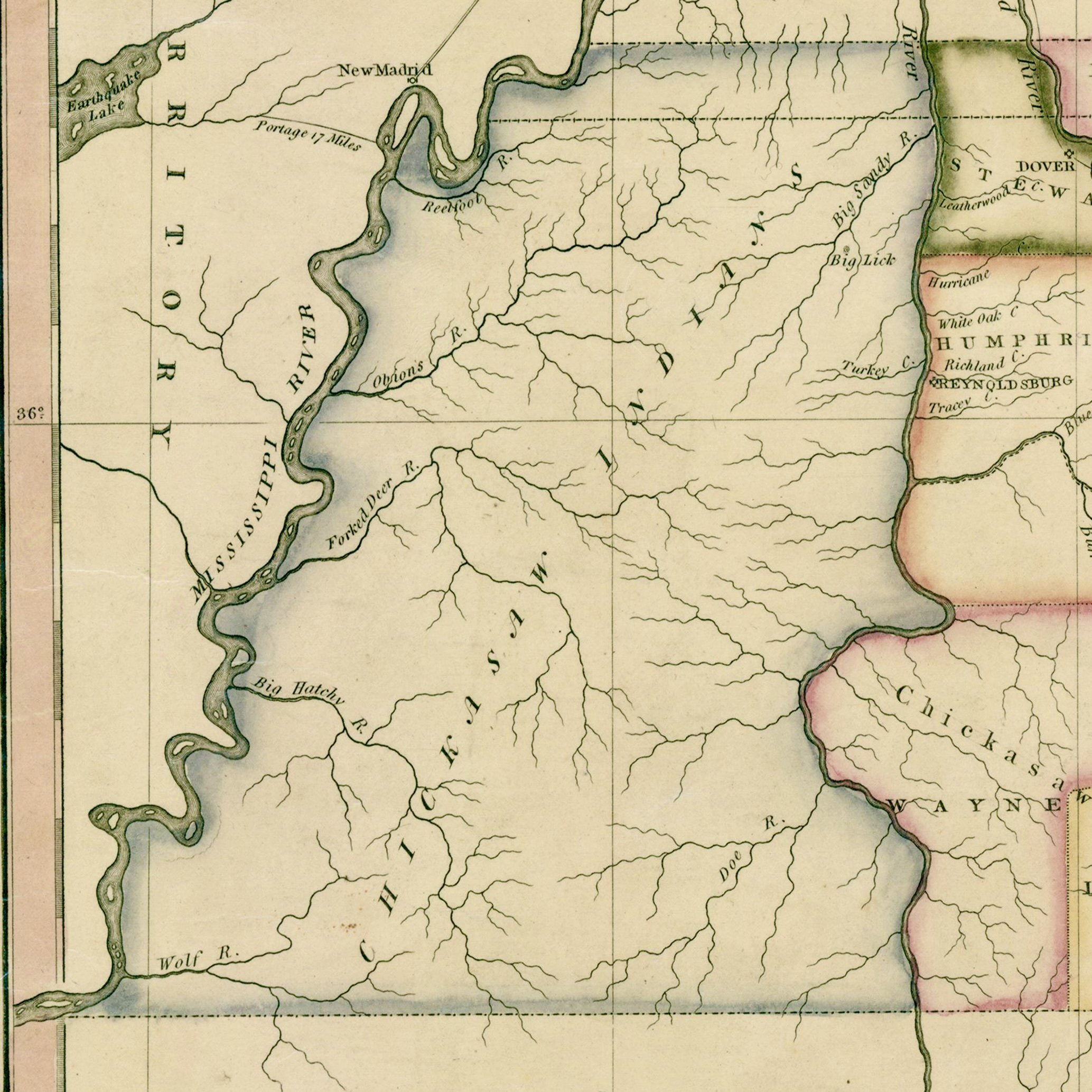
Map of the West Tennessee portion of the Great Chickasaw Cession, mapped 1819, showing "Big Lick" landmark near Big Sandy River

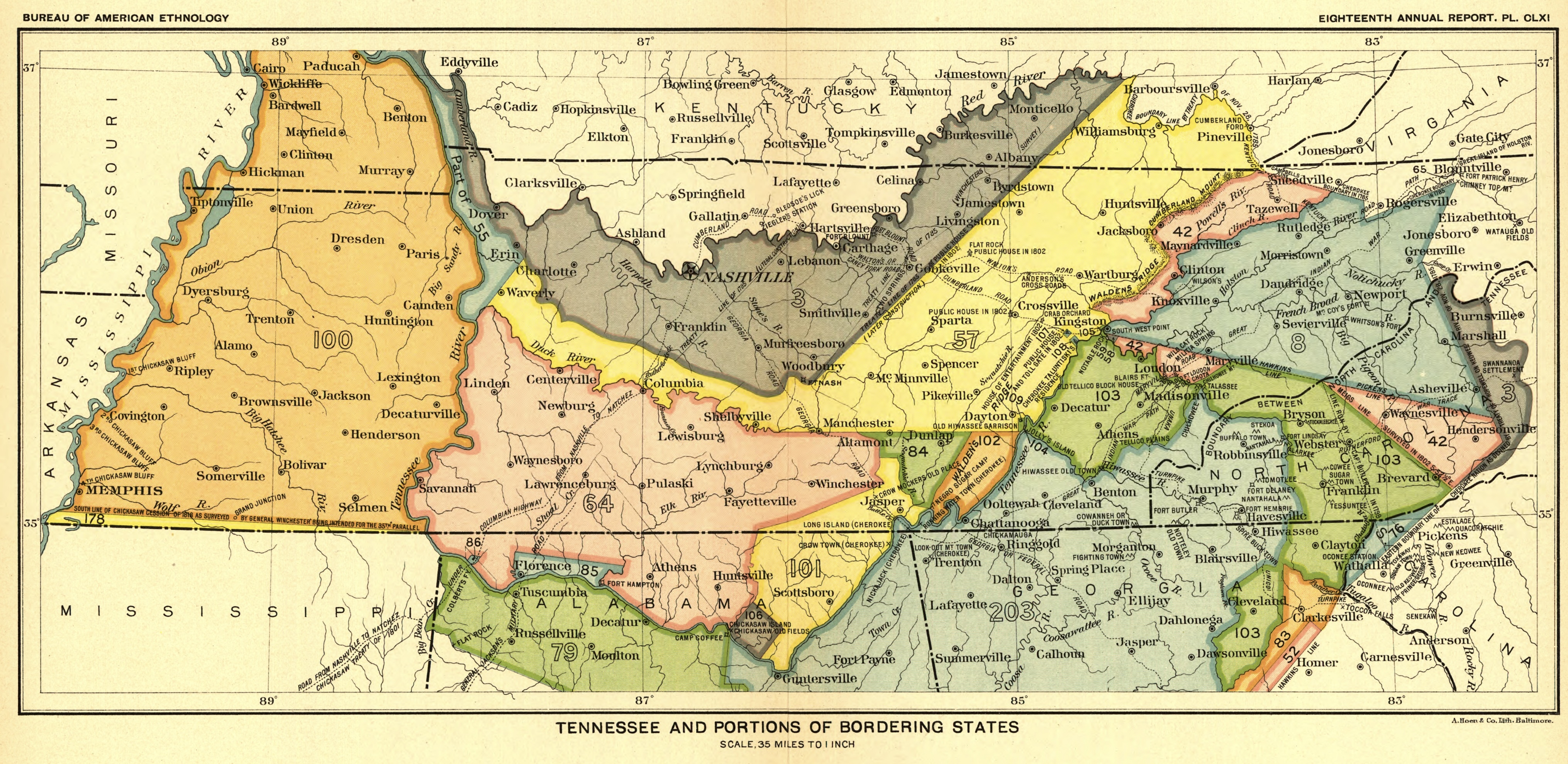
The 1818 Chickasaw Purchase, also known as the Jackson Purchase, is colored orange

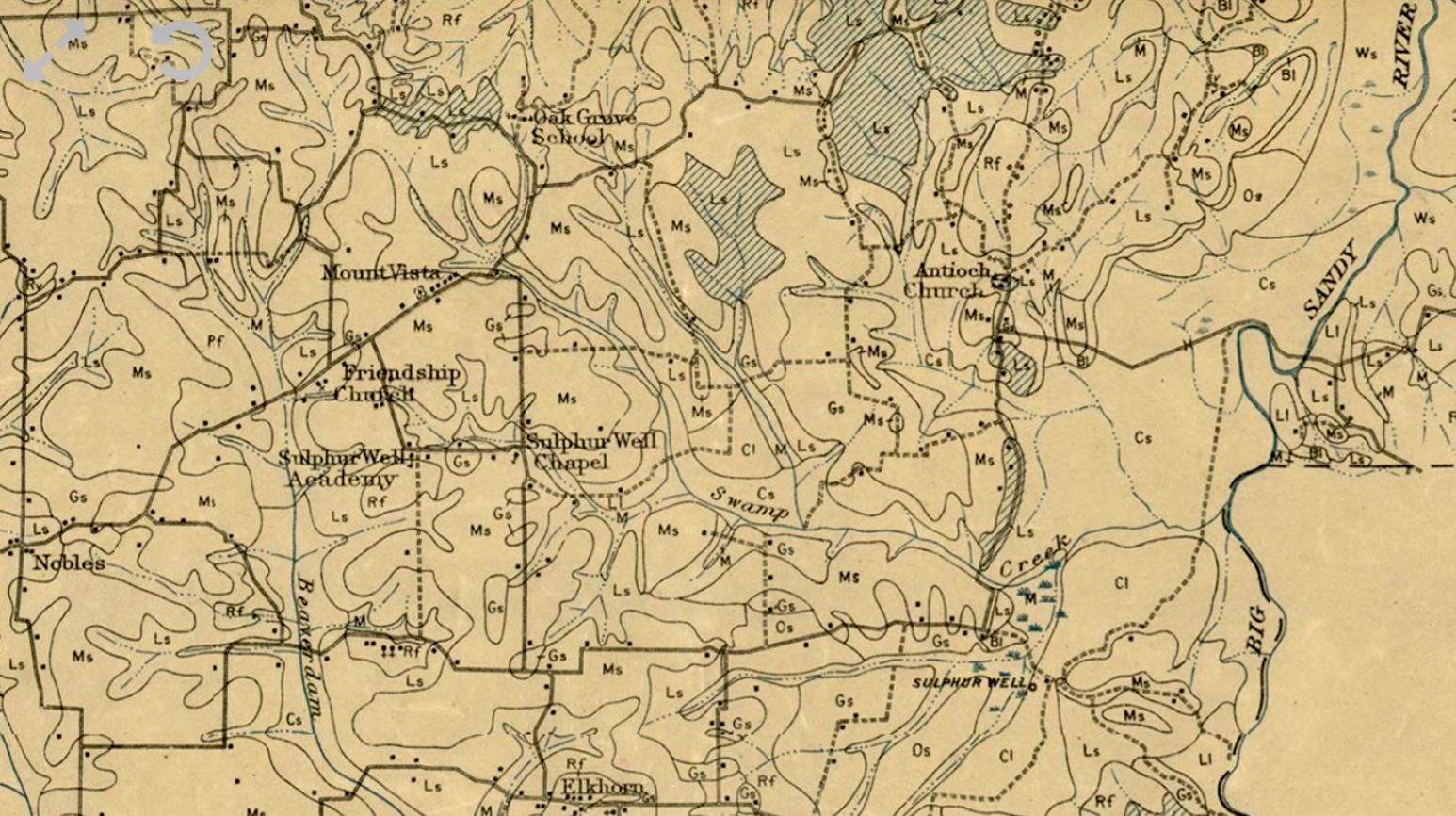
Sulphur Well section of Henry County, Tennessee, mapped 1922

The Salt Lick Reservation controversy was a land speculation and corruption scandal involving Andrew Jackson, who was the seventh U.S. president, serving from 1828 to 1836. The controversy began in 1818 when Jackson was a United States Indian commissioner and ended during his presidency in 1832. The "salt lick reserve" clause of the Treaty of Tuscaloosa between the Chickasaw and the U.S. government was alleged to be a corrupt transfer of Indigenous land to business partners of the treaty commissioners, who had taken advantage of their public trust as government agents to obtain the lands through backchannels at prices very much below market value. The United States Congress prevented the transfer of the "salt lick reserve" in 1818 and again in the 1830s. It is not clear that there was ever any salt resource in the first place; it may have merely been an invented pretext for a special side deal under the guise of delivering value to the Chickasaw for their real estate with lease payments and bushels of salt. The two men who made the deal for the "salt lick" lands, which would have been legitimized had Congress ratified that draft of the treaty, were a future member of Jackson's presidential Kitchen Cabinet, and a merchant and banker from Franklin, Tennessee.

== History ==
The Salt Lick Reservation controversy was a political scandal resulting from a section of the 1818 land cession treaty negotiated between the Chickasaw people and the United States by Indian commissioners Andrew Jackson and Isaac Shelby. The salt lick reserve was discussed in article five of the treaty.

The special arrangements for the so-called Salt Lick Reservation, four by four miles square, were described in "a strange and cumbersomely worded clause in the treaty." Located in present-day Henry County, in close proximity to the Big Sandy River, a tributary of the Tennessee River, there was supposedly a salt lick that was claimed to be a resource equivalent to the Kanawha saltworks along the Great Kanawha River in what is now West Virginia.

In exchange for the reserve, the lessees were to supply the chiefs with either $750 or 750 bushels of salt annually for 199 years. The secret lease agreement was signed the day after the treaty was signed. Oddly, upon examination, there was no such salt resource. Without the presence of salt (which decades later was defended as having been a sham claim promulgated by unnamed unscrupulous early traders, in which the Indian commissioners had trustingly, naively believed), no such trade could be made.

A similar agreement was made with the Miami in 1818, under which the United States was to provide the tribe with 160 bushels of salt each year. For context, as of 1810, the Kanawha saltworks produced about 400 bushels of salt per day.

== Corruption charges ==
Beginning in 1819 there were "apparently quite widespread" reports that alleged that the Salt Lick tract was in fact an underhanded land speculation scheme designed to profit the friends and relations of future U.S. President Andrew Jackson, one of the treaty commissioners. The two most famous sources of the Salt Lick Reservation corruption allegations were merchant and lawyer Jesse Benton, younger brother of future U.S. Senator Thomas Hart Benton, and John Williams, then a sitting U.S. Senator from Tennessee. There were two partners signed on to a 199-year lease for the salt lick that was to be included in the treaty: one was William Berkeley Lewis, husband of one of Andrew Jackson's wards, brother-in-law to Jackson's Secretary of War John Eaton, and later a key figure in his presidential kitchen cabinet, and one was Robert P. Currin (1789–1857), a Tennessee businessman who was still seeking Congressional relief for his investment as of 1838.

Benton's explanation of the alleged scheme was this:

The mode they practised was, by making these reserves to the Indians, with the right to sell. The law forbids such bargains, but the article giving the right to sell, superseded the statute. These contracts were not binding until the treaty received the sanction of the President and Senate. After proper delays, the treaty was ratified. The news of the ratification of the treaty and of these reserves, arrived at the town of Franklin during the sitting of the circuit court. Instantly two companies of knowing ones formed to buy the land. They found the lick was secured by the persons concerned. The Hon. James Trimble, Ephraim Foster, Charles G. Olmstead, and William Banks, Esqs., went off, post haste...[to] purchase the land. After a journey of 200 miles, day and night, in which some of them broke down on the road, they arrived in the nation. They called on Colbert. No words can express their astonishment in finding that the day after the treaty was ratified in Washington City, though one thousand miles off, that the agent, Donnelly, had confirmed the lick and land contracts for Lewis, Jackson, and others. John Williams and John H. Eaton were the Senators. The treaty-making power is vested in the President and Senate, the House of Representatives being considered too numerous to be trusted with business that requires great secrecy. Lewis and Senator Eaton are brothers-in-law; according to their friend Edwards, no secrets among relations. There was something so base in this mode of cheating the government, that the parties concerned seemed to wish to hide their guilt by their ingenuity. They pretended it was but a small affair, that if government chose, it might, by paying their $20,000 back, though they had paid it in goods, that they would give up the land. Some of us had informed government of the trick, and the offer was seized. The party have been active in their hostility to Col. Williams ever since.

According to Williams' 20th century biographer Leota Driver Maiden, Williams supported candidate William H. Crawford in the 1824 election, so political motive to air Jackson's dirty laundry certainly existed, but "that [Williams] stooped to slanderous falsehood" was claimed only by Jackson himself and his close circle of loyalists. Jackson's opponents said Lewis was acting as Jackson's tool, which Jackson denied but "though he stubbornly refused to recognize the impropriety of Lewis' conduct in thus betraying his confidence, he nevertheless made Lewis and others who were present at the treaty state that Lewis' plans and actions remained undiscovered until after the return to Nashville."

== Lewis & Currin ==
James D. Porter, an ex-Confederate and Democratic governor of Tennessee from 1875 to 1879, argued in 1904 that Jackson was wholly ignorant of any scheming that may have taken place: "General Jackson never suspected wrong from any of his friends; it was next to impossible to shake his confidence in them. He would rather have suffered injustice than to believe that in a pecuniary transaction they would connive at his injury." Currin, who expended $3,000 to develop "the salt works," found that there was little or no such salt to be mined, but he did create an excellent well of sulphurated water. Currin was said to have been "the business partner of another brother-in-law," all three of the brothers-in-law having married daughters of North Carolina–Nashville land speculator William Terrell Lewis. According to "Harpeth" writing in The Tennessean in 1879, Currin had also at one time, when the Bentons still lived at Leiper's Fork (also known as Bentonville or Hillsboro), courted Polly Benton, the sister of Jesse and Thomas Hart Benton. The Louisville Courier-Journal in 1836 deemed both Lewis and Currin "confidential friends of General Jackson." In 1837, Currin, Boyd McNairy, and N. A. McNairy were jointly the executors of the estate of federal judge John McNairy, who had given Andrew Jackson his first law job in Nashville in the 1780s. (Also, when Currin died in 1857 he left property to a son named John McNairy Currin.) Recent scholarship has show that Jackson's vast tree of Donelson in-laws, and his long list of wards and their spouses and kinsmen, served as both a social foundation for economic success: "They fought the native peoples, negotiated the treaties to end the fighting and demanded native lands as the price of war, surveyed the newly available lands, bought those lands, litigated over disputed boundaries, adjudicated the cases, and made and kept laws within the region that had been carved out of Indian lands."

== Jackson administration ==
The Salt Lick Reserve issue resurfaced as a controversy during each of Jackson's three presidential runs, in 1824, 1828, and 1832. As Eaton and another Jackson kinsman and business partner, John Coffee, were during the Andrew Jackson administration involved in negotiating what became the Indian Removal treaties, the question of the Salt Lick Reservation attracted the attention of the United States Congress. One of Indian treaties produced in 1832, during the Jackson administration, was to include additional language about the value and transfer of this land. Representative William W. Ellsworth, of Connecticut and the Anti-Jacksonian Party, stated for the record, "The transaction was suspicious, and needs explanation. What had the commissioners to do with the matter of Mr. Lewis? They were sent to buy land from the Indians, not to sell land to white men. They must have known that Mr. Lewis had no title before, and here for $2,000 at a blow he acquired 10,000 acres of valuable land." Edward Everett, of Massachusetts and the Whig Party, stated, "It is essentially corrupt, and the parties concerned in it have laid themselves under a responsibility which no Act of the Senate can remove." Jackson persisted. According to "Veritas" writing in the Louisville paper, having failed to get the Senate to accept a new clause about this land in one treaty, during a round of talks with the Chickasaw in Washington "conducted by the President himself...strange as it may seem to ordinary men, the article which was unanimously stricken out of the former treaty, was re-inserted by the order of President Jackson, and submitted to the Senate for its advice and consent!! This renewed effort to enable a member of the Kitchen Cabinet, and another Executive favorite, to obtain by a fraudulent speculation, a large amount of money from the public Treasury, was, without debate, rejected; and so the matter ended, to the great dissatisfaction of the President, and this precious pair of official speculators."

Congress declared the reservation forfeit to the United States in 1832. This left the land in a state of legal limbo, and the Chickasaw Nation claimed that the tract rightfully reverted to them. However, that year U.S. Secretary of War Charles Conrad reviewed the claim and deemed it invalid.

Jackson and Shelby's Chickasaw "salt lick" begot Currin's sulphur well. According to the Tennessee Encyclopedia, "Henry County's first tourist attraction, Sulphur Well, was created by accident in 1821, when an artesian well of sulphur water was struck in an attempt to locate a large salt bed...Eventually a summer resort was erected at the site to accommodate the large numbers of people who came to drink the water, which was believed to have health benefits. Many sought refuge at Sulphur Well during the 1837 yellow fever epidemic. In 1944 Sulphur Well was covered by the Tennessee Valley Authority's Kentucky Lake, the largest man-made lake in the United States and the second largest in the world."

== See also ==
- Chickasaw Bluffs
- Andrew Jackson and land speculation in the United States
- Treaty of St. Mary's (1818)

== Sources ==
- Atkinson, James R. (2010). Splendid Land, Splendid People: The Chickasaw Indians to Removal. Tuscaloosa: University of Alabama Press. ISBN 978-0-8173-8337-4.
- Harlan, Louis R. (March 1948). "Public Career of William Berkeley Lewis". Tennessee Historical Quarterly. 7 (1): 3–37. ISSN 0040-3261.
- Inman, Natalie R. (2017). Brothers and Friends: Kinship in Early America. Early American Spaces. Athens, Georgia: University of Georgia Press. doi:10.1353/book51901. ISBN 978-0-8203-5110-0. LCCN 2016055415. OCLC 985105661.
- Maiden, Leota Driver (1958). "Colonel John Williams". East Tennessee Historical Society's Publications. 30. Tennessee Historical Commission, University of Tennessee. Knoxville, Tennessee: East Tennessee Historical Society: 7–46. ISSN 0361-6193. OCLC 1137265. FHL 1345572.
- Lippincott, Isaac (1912). "The Early Salt Trade of the Ohio Valley". Journal of Political Economy. 20 (10): 1029–1052. ISSN 0022-3808.
- Porter, James D. (1904). "The Chickasaw Treaty of 1818". The American Historical Magazine and Tennessee Historical Society Quarterly. 9 (3): 252–256. ISSN 2333-8997. JSTOR 45332062.
