= Jesse Benton Jr. =

American pioneer (1783–1843)

Jesse Benton
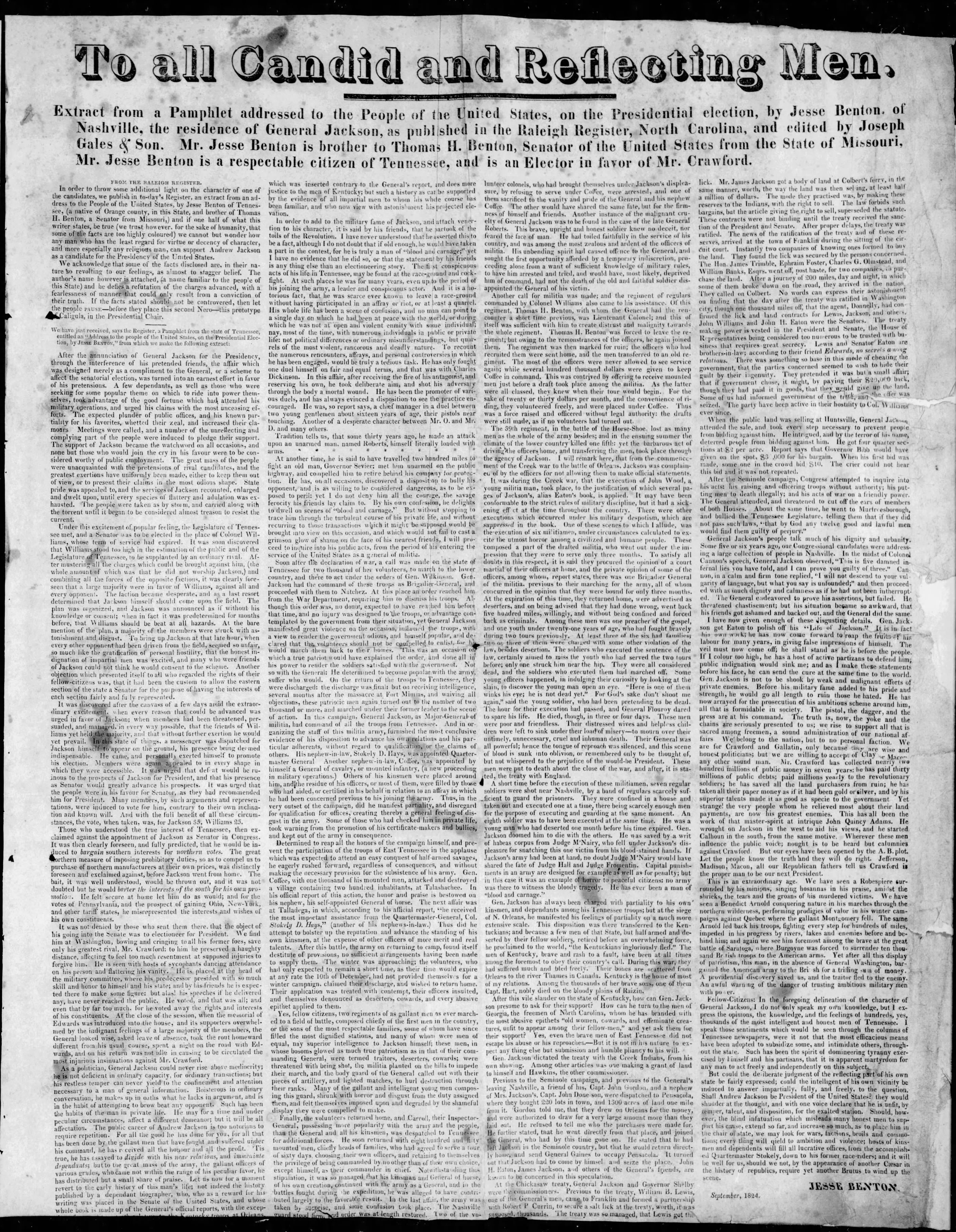
- Benton statement against Andrew Jackson's candidacy for high office
- Born: c. 1783; Orange County, North Carolina
- Died: October 17, 1843; Sabine Parish, Louisiana

Jesse Benton Jr. (November 5? c. 1783 – October 17, 1843) was an American settler of Tennessee and Texas who worked as a lawyer and who was closely tied to the interpersonal conflict behind Tennessee and American politics in the Jacksonian era. His brother was U.S. Senator Thomas Hart Benton, and the writer Jessie Benton Frémont was his niece. He and his brother were involved in a tavern brawl with Andrew Jackson in Nashville in 1813, and Jesse Benton shot Jackson in the arm. In 1824, Benton, a supporter of presidential candidate William H. Crawford, published an anti-Jackson pamphlet accusing him of nepotism, corruption, and grossly abusive behavior to subordinates. Benton was an early pioneer of the Republic of Texas; he left Washington-on-the-Brazos, to recruit reinforcements just days before the storied Battle of the Alamo with the Mexican army. Benton died in Louisiana in 1843.

== North Carolina to Middle Tennessee ==
Jesse Benton was one of eight children born to North Carolina land speculator Jesse Benton and his wife Mary "Nancy" Gooch Benton. According to the Raleigh Register in 1824, Benton was a native of Orange County, North Carolina. The family moved to Leiper's Fork, Tennessee along the Natchez Trace around 1801. There was mail waiting for Jesse Benton in Natchez, Mississippi in 1807, and 1808.

Benton was also involved in a duel with future Tennessee Governor William Carroll that was, reportedly, several steps away from the original insult:

1. Carroll slapped an officer who had insulted him in some way at a ball; according to Elbert Smith this was Lyttleton Johnson
2. The officer sent Carroll a duel challenge that was carried by a man named Pilcher
3. Carroll kicked Pilcher down the stairs for insulting him by bringing him the challenge from the officer
4. Pilcher challenged Carroll to a duel for kicking him down the stairs, which message he sent by Boyd McNairy
5. When Boyd McNairy delivered the message to Carroll, the latter refused to duel Pilcher on the grounds that he was not enough of a gentleman to participate in a duel, and when McNairy offered to duel Carroll in Pilcher's place, Carroll said McNairy had been disqualified from dueling "because you were second in a duel and you made your man fire before the word was given."
6. McNairy delivered the above information back to Pilcher, who then sent Jesse Benton as his messenger, and after consulting with Andrew Jackson who said that Carroll might as well duel Benton as anyone since it seemed like an inevitability, Carroll and Benton dueled at a place called Sandy Bottom, in which doing Carroll was hit in the thumb and Benton took a through-and-through gunshot wound to the buttocks which left him bedridden for six months, likely contributed to long-term health problems, and was a source of much merriment amongst the local Jacksonians.

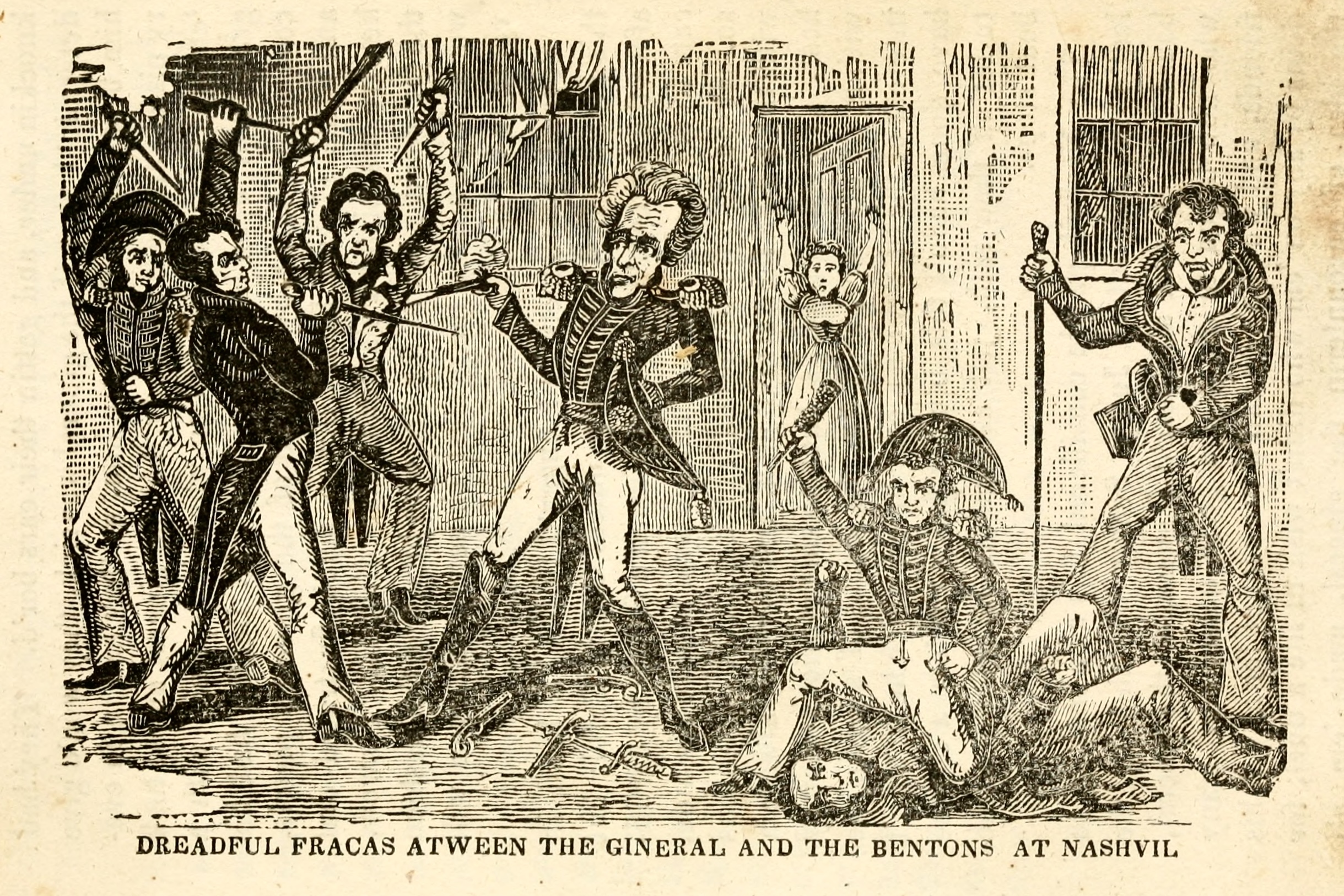
"Dreadful Fracas Atween the Gineral and the Bentons at Nashvil" from Seba Smith's 1834 parodic biography of Andrew Jackson

Jackson served as Carroll's second in the duel that injured Jesse Benton. While this was going on, future U.S. Senator from Missouri Thomas Hart Benton was in the capital city, Washington, D.C., lobbying on behalf of Jackson, who had launched the Natchez Expedition without funding from the U.S. Department of War, and thus needed to get a funding appropriation made by Congress to cover his substantial expenses—he had borrowed $1,000 from merchant banker James Jackson to buy beef and cornmeal and flour for the troops on the road home, and to rent wagons with draymen to haul the sick. When Benton got back to Nashville and discovered that his brother had been shot with support from Jackson, all while he had been hustling on Jackson's behalf, a second conflict erupted. Thus it was that, on September 4, 1813, the Benton brothers fought Andrew Jackson, John Coffee, Stockley D. Hays, and Alexander "Sandy" Donelson in a tavern in Nashville. The Bentons got the better of Jackson in the tavern brawl, as Jesse Benton left Jackson with a "shoulder full of buckshot," a significant injury that left Jackson in a sling for months.

== West Tennessee ==
After the War of 1812, Benton seems to have relocated from middle Tennessee to west Tennessee, in the vicinity of present-day Memphis. Jesse Benton reportedly came back to Hillsboro (Leiper's Fork) from the west to see about the graves of his three sisters. According to The Tennessean, which interviewed the neighbors in 1878, "The graveyard was built after the family had left here, which accounts for its small size. Jesse Benton came to the old homestead from Memphis for the express, purpose, of having it done, and it was built of nicely dressed stone and put together with mortar...'I was present, when Isaac Benton laid off the stone wall. It is very dilapidated, now, much of it down, that now stands around the graves of Polly, Nancy, and Peggy Benton, and two of Nat Benton's children. The wall was built by two men by the name of Craig and Russell, I think, in the year 1816, or 17. Craig and Russell boarded at my father's while doing the work...I was well acquainted with the Bentons. Their mother moved to Missouri and died there." The sisters and their father had all died of tuberculosis. The same account of the Bentons in Williamson County stated, "Jesse is represented as having been a man of awful temper and of indomitable perseverance."

He married Mary "Polly" Childress in Williamson County in 1817. According to the memoir of an early surveyor, "No other persons had settled in Shelby County at that time that I know of unless Jesse Benton had done so on Big Creek." He was an early settler of Tipton County at the Third Chickasaw Bluff in the 1820s. In May 1822 he was a commissioner for a new road from Memphis to the Big Creek settlement and Loosahatchie River, and thence to the Forked Deer River, as well as a local justice of the peace. Benton promoted the development of Randolph, Tennessee. Randolph was an important riverfront settlement near the Second Chickasaw Bluff and mouth of the Hatchie River but the construction of the Memphis and Charleston Railroad to rival port town of Memphis doomed Randolph to long-term decline. According to local historian Marshall Winfield of the West Tennessee Historical Society there is a story about Benton's approach to "justice" in west Tennessee:

Jesse Benton, who had settled on the second bluff about 1820, was a very colorful character... Uncompromising in his prejudices and opinions, Benton was a law unto himself. On one occasion he entrusted a lot of livestock to a man to sell for him in New Orleans. The man returned without any money, saying he had been robbed. Benton said the man had stolen the money. He ordered his overseer and slaves to take the man across the river and box him up in a hollow tree where he would have to stand upright without food and water until he disgorged or told the truth about the money. After three days they went back, taking along a crosscut saw. When the treed man stuck to the story that he was robbed, Benton ordered his men to saw the tree down. When the incarcerated man felt the teeth of the saw ripping through his clothing he begged not to be sawn asunder and confessed that he had lost Benton's money in a New Orleans gambling house. Benton had the sawing stopped and the case was settled by a civil court.

== The "Tennessee opposition" to Andrew Jackson ==
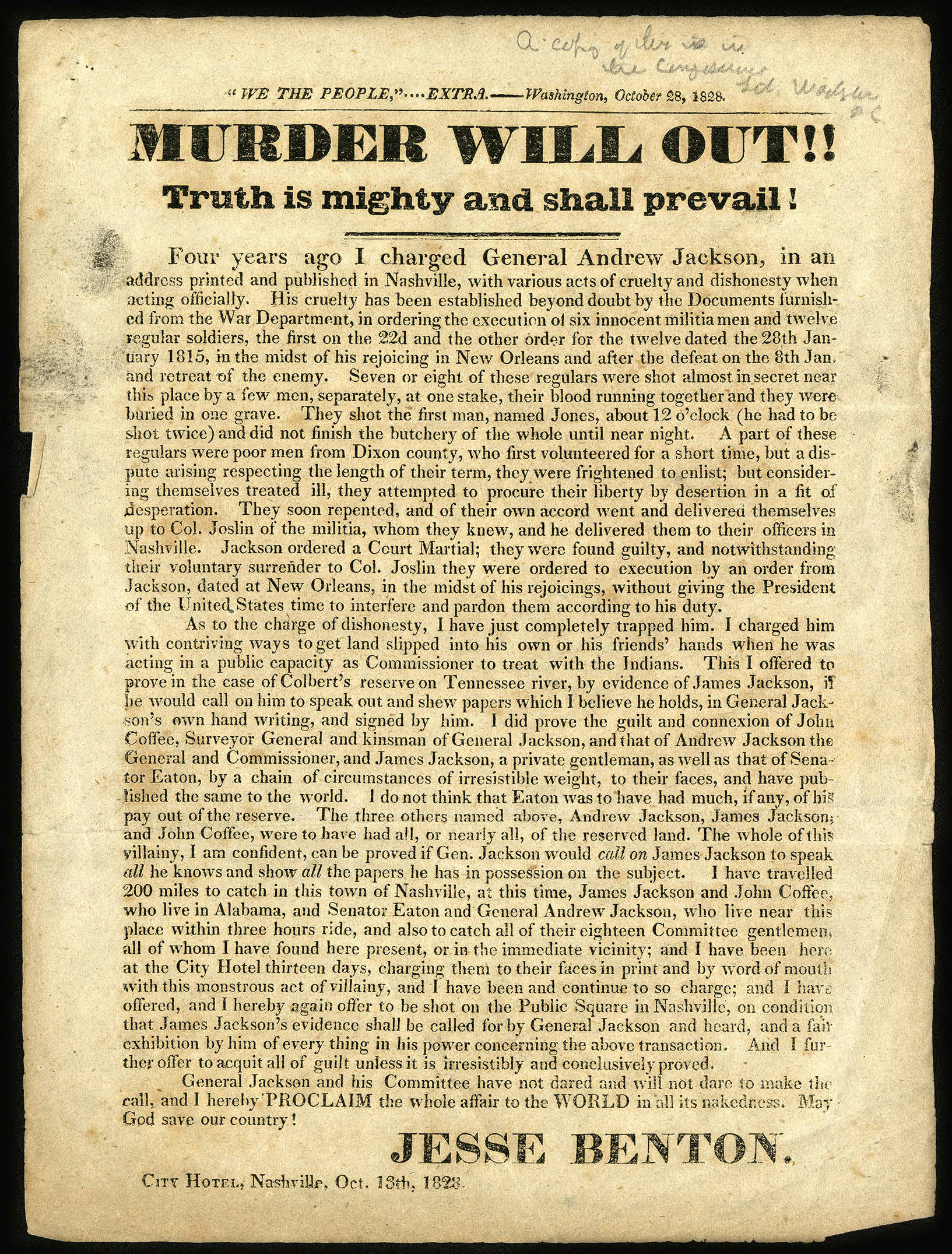
"Murder will out! Truth is mighty and will prevail!" (Jesse Benton, 1828)

According to historian Thomas Abernethy, there were a number of Tennesseans "who would not bend the knee" to Andrew Jackson, including Jesse Benton, Boyd McNairy, John Williams, James Jackson, Wilkins Tannehill, and Newton Cannon. In August 1824 Benton listed himself as a candidate to be a presidential elector for William H. Crawford, and then in October 1824 recommitted himself to the apparently more viable candidate Henry Clay. Also in October 1824 he "issued a pamphlet villifying Jackson. This was circulated all over the country, but particularly in Tennessee and North Carolina." The pamphlet and a similar broadside charged Jackson with nepotism, corruption, and grossly abusive behavior to subordinates and his supporters described it as "scurrilous." According to historian Louis Harlan, the pamphlet "accused the General of 'every known offense against Divine and human laws,' among other things, of bulldozing and corruption in the Senate election of 1823, of speculation in Florida lands and the salt lick reservation, and barbaric personal conduct." William Berkeley Lewis, one of Jackson's circle of political promoters, wrote a point-by-point rebuttal in anonymous letter form that was published in the Philadelphia Columbia Observer on September 20, 1824. Benton was beaten in the race for elector by Nathaniel Dyer.

Apparently Jackson and Benton had another physical fight at the "old Bell tavern in Memphis," probably sometime in the 1820s, which Jackson this time won. Thomas Hart Benton was eventually reconciled to Jackson and became one of his key allies in the U.S. Senate. Jesse Benton and Thomas Hart Benton became and remained partially or totally estranged over the Senator's alliance with Jackson.

== Mississippi and the Republic of Texas ==
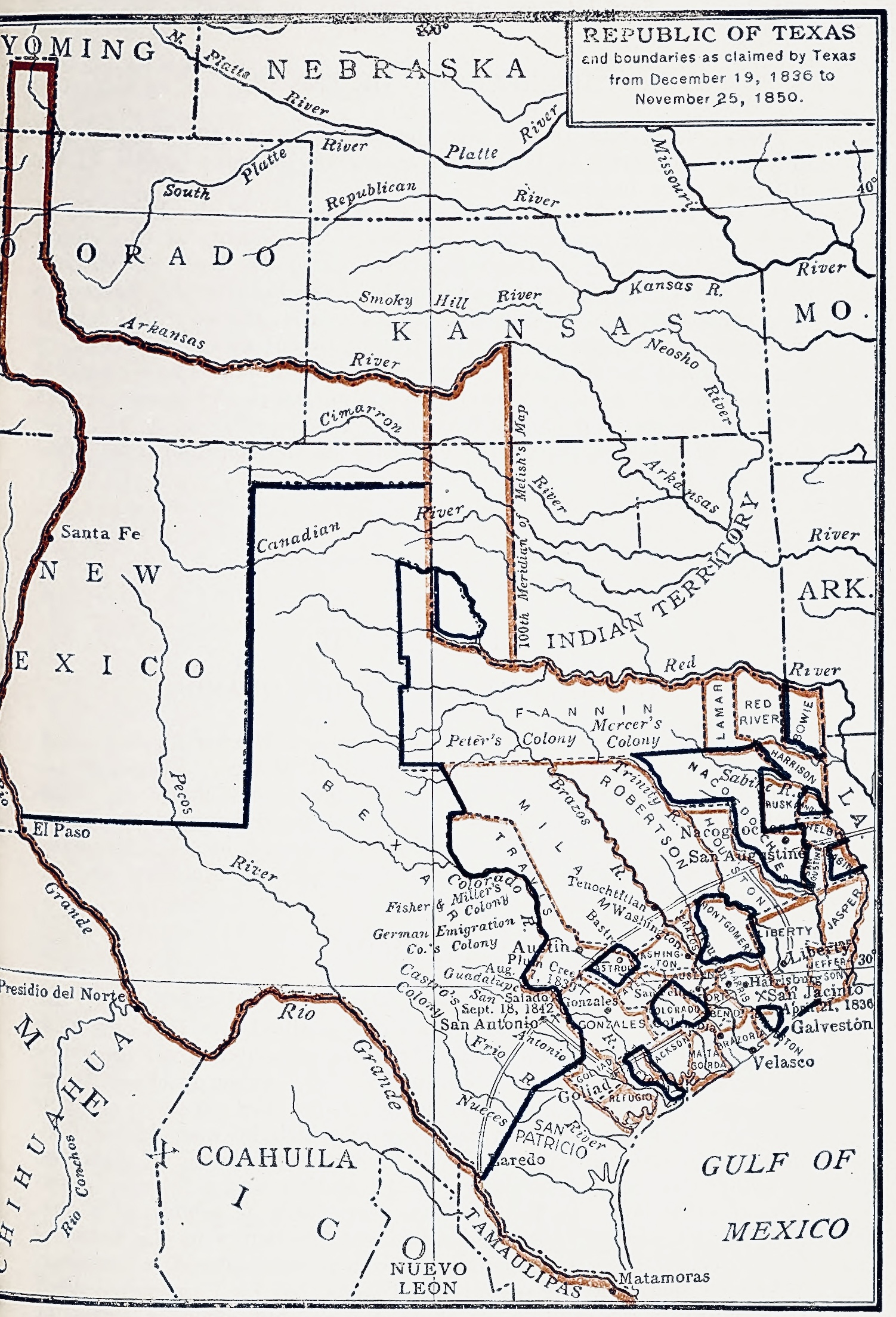
Republic of Texas and boundaries as claimed by Texas, 1836–1850 (Z. T. Fulmore, 1926)

As of 1835, Benton was hanging out his shingle as a lawyer in Mississippi, advertising himself as a resident of Madisonville, Mississippi, "who proposes to practice law in the Circuit and Probate Courts of Madison county, the Circuit Courts of Hinds, Yazoo, Holmes, and Attala, also, he will attend the High Court of Errors and Appeals, the Superior Court of Chancery, and the U. S. District Court, at Jackson."

Benton was part of a group that traveled together from Nacogdoches, Texas in 1836, several of whom, including Davy Crockett, were later killed defending the Alamo from the Mexican Army. Benton, Peter Harper, and H. S. Kimble separated the group at Washington, Texas, rather than continuing on to San Antonio. Early reports about the Battle of the Alamo erroneously reported that Benton had been killed with Davy Crockett and James Butler Bonham. A scrawled note on an 1829 letter written by Benton that is held in the San Jacinto Museum manuscript collection reads, "The gamest man I ever saw, killed in the Alamo, Texas, 1835." On April 21, 1836, the Arkansas Gazette newspaper reported, "The previous report of the death of Col. Jesse Benton is incorrect. Mr. [Jesse B.] Badgett saw him near Nacogdoches about the 25th, on his way to Jonesborough, Miller county, in this Territory, where a volunteer company was organizing, and with whom he intended marching for the seat of war."

A letter written by Benton was published in a Memphis newspaper after the battle:

Near Nacogdoches, 22d Feb., 1836.

DEAR SIR—A month's sickness had reduced me almost to the grave. I am now better and traveling on.

Official information has just reached us that Santa Anna has crossed the Rio Grande, and is marching against us with a large army for the purpose of exterminating us. I will place myself in the infantry as a private soldier, and if he pass our bayonets I will be deceived. Nearly all our troops are riflemen; no body of infantry to lodge on to form squares, or rush on with and crush the enemy. We will die hard, for it will be truly victory or death with us.

Our volunteers have consumed our provisions and a great many have left us—just what I expected.

Gen. Cos and his troops, we are informed, have broken their parole, and are returning against us.

The country on the Rio Grande is given up to a brutal soldiery. Seven or eight hundred American citizens from the U.S., reside in Metamoras. Women are treated worse than words can paint. If we cannot defend the county in any other way, we can do it effectually by adopting the Russian mode of defence, against Napoleon in 1819.

A great many rivers cross Texas running from north to south. The country becomes too soft for cavalry and artillery in wet weather—and if the Mexican troops confine themselves to the sea coast to receive supplies, the climate will destroy them.

I write this in haste; you will know my weak state by my bad writing. A gentleman is waiting to take this on. I hope it will reach you safe, and that you will publish it, in hopes that this information may arouse our brave young men in the west to come on as fast as possible to our assistance.

Beef is plenty in the country.

Your friend,

JESSE BENTON.

L. W. Kemp's notes state that Benton "came to Texas in 1835; he was a member of Patton's Columbia Volunteers in the San Jacinto campaign and remained at the camp opposite Harrisburg; he was a member of the Texas House of Representatives in 1839–1840." According to Republic of Texas military records, Benton "enlisted April 9, 1836 in the company of Columbia Volunteers, commanded by Captain William H. Patton. He served as a private until April 23, 1836. He was honorably discharged October 9, 1836 having risen to the rank of first Sergeant, and first Lieutenant of the company." In 1842, Benton was the District Attorney for the Seventh Judicial District of the Republic of Texas.

== Death ==
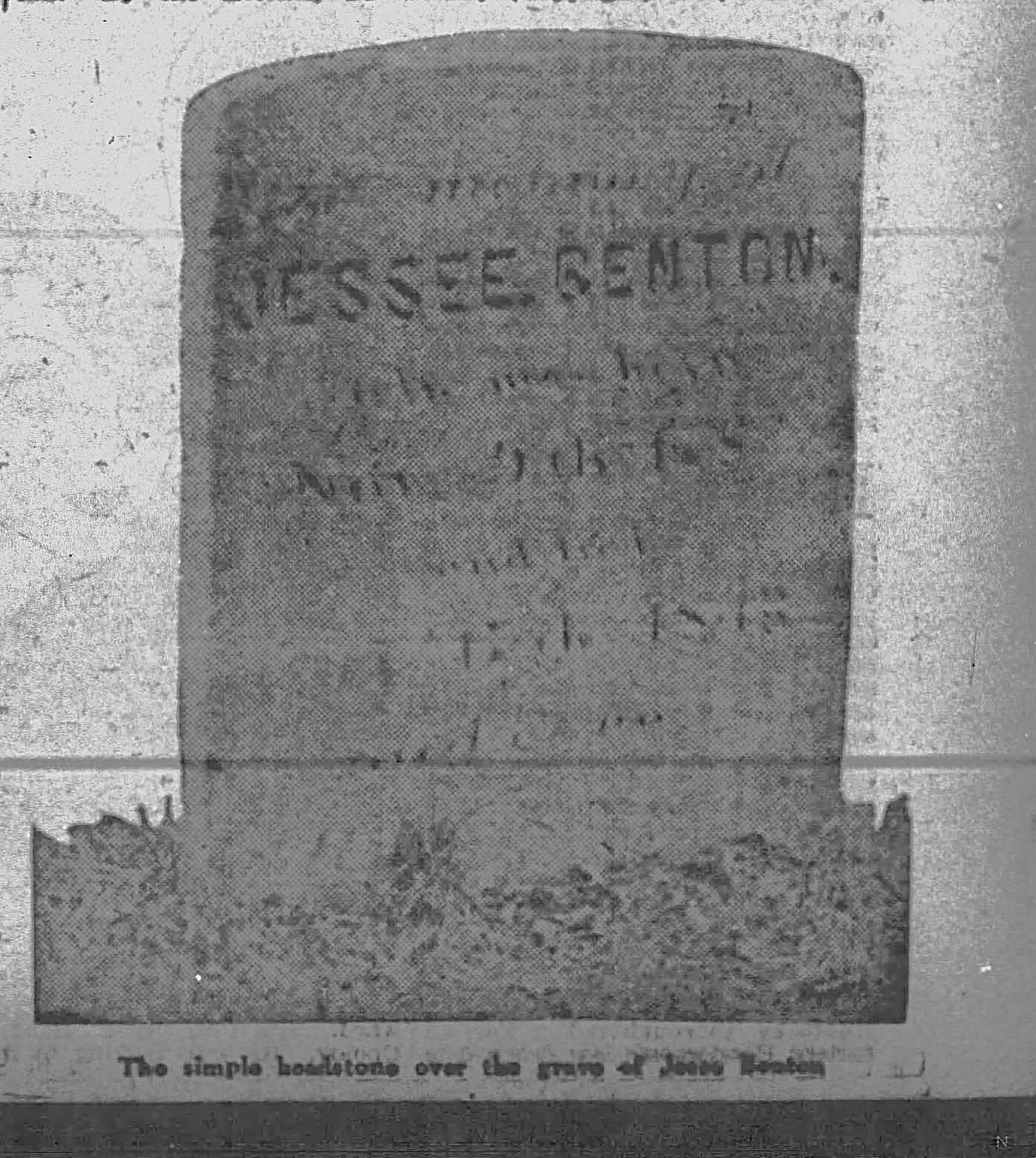
Original grave marker of Jesse Benton Jr., since lost and replaced (The Tennessean, 1934)

Benton died in Sabine Parish, Louisiana in 1843. At the time of his death he was part of a caravan of two related families, and their slaves, that were migrating back to Tennessee after the death of their kinsman, Texian leader Kelsey Harris Douglas. Benton died without issue and left his property to his widow and his brother T. H. Benton. He and several family members are buried at Nashville City Cemetery.

== See also ==
- History of Randolph, Tennessee
