= Treaty of Tuscaloosa =

Treaty between the Chickasaw Indians and the United States

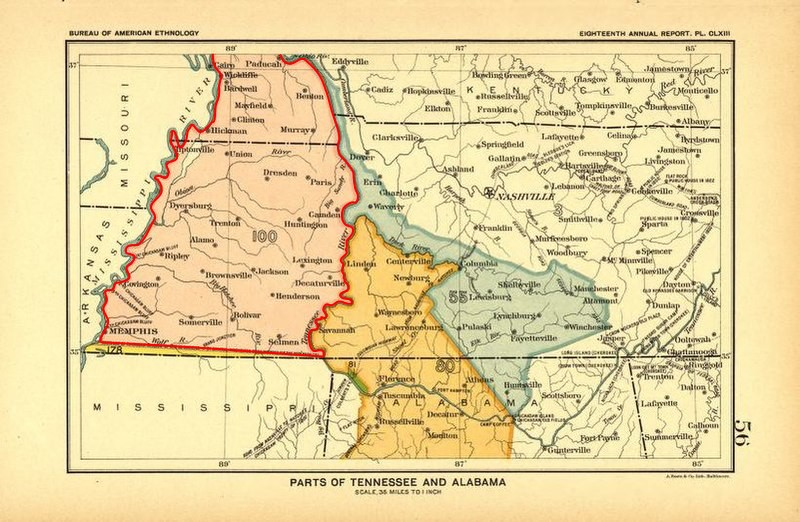
The Western Tennessee land acquisitions under President James Monroe between the Chickasaw and the U. S. affecting the states of Kentucky and Tennessee, and the Alabama Territory: *Pink with red outline – Treaty of Tuscaloosa (1818) * Orange – Treaty of Chickasaw Council House (1816) *Gray – Treaty with Chickasaw (1805)

The Treaty of Tuscaloosa, also known as the Treaty of Old Town, was signed in October 1818, and ratified by Congress in January 1819, endorsed by President James Monroe. It was one of a series of treaties made between the Chickasaw Indians and the United States that year. The Treaty of Tuscaloosa was represented by Senator Andrew Jackson and ex-governor Isaac Shelby to the Chickasaw. It resulted in the acquisition of the Jackson Purchase (which included extreme western Kentucky and most of the West Tennessee division).

== Treaty ==
On October 19, 1818, state senator Jackson and former Kentucky governor Shelby, as plenipotentiaries for the state of Kentucky, completed negotiations with the Chickasaw on what was to become known as the Treaty of Tuscaloosa, one of several treaties consummated in 1818 which resulted in the Jackson Purchase. The treaty targeted land that had been recognized as Chickasaw territory by the 1786 Treaty of Hopewell; that is, the lands in Tennessee and Kentucky that were west of the Tennessee River, an uninhabited woodland area of about 10,700 square miles of territory that the tribe controlled. The treaty is also known as the Treaty of Old Town; historian John Trotwood Moore believed that the treaty was signed at what is known as "Old Pontotoc" not far from Pontotoc Creek and the Natchez Trace stand at Tokshish.

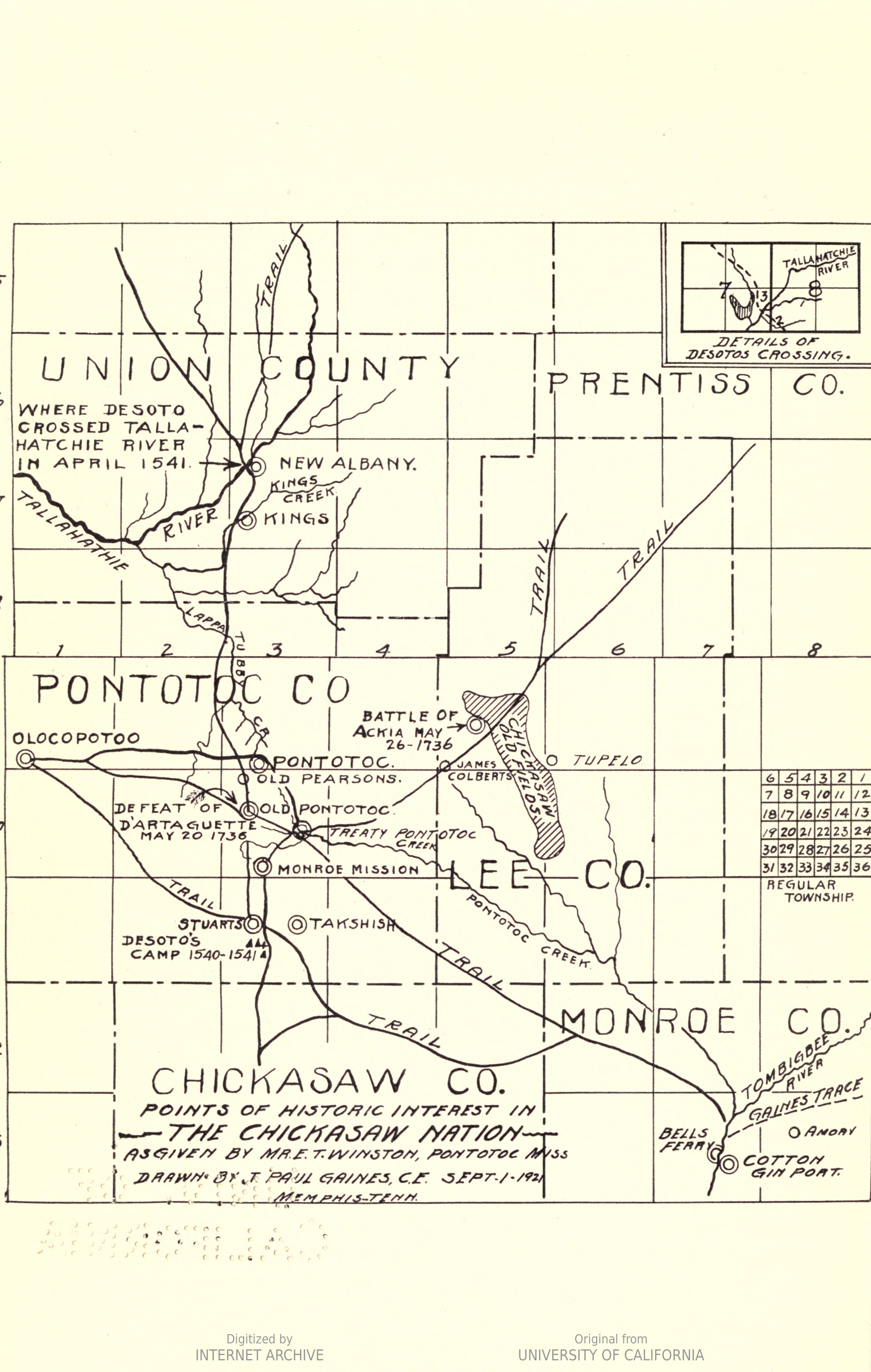
Points of historic interest in the Chickasaw Nation, Mississippi (drawn 1922)

Prior to the signing of the treaty, Levi Colbert (Itawamba Mingo), who, along with his brother George (Tootesmastube), had inherited the leadership of the Chickasaw tribe, had agreed to this transfer of the tribe's hunting grounds. This was purportedly due to the acceptance of a bribe by the Colberts. The expanse of land between the Mississippi River and the western valley of the Tennessee River was traded for $300,000, to be paid in twenty annual installments. Other Chickasaw leaders party to the treaties were Chinubby and Tishomingo.

== Corruption allegations ==
Jesse Benton Jr. alleged throughout the 1820s that Andrew Jackson had acted simultaneously as the U.S. Indian commissioner and the head of a land company organized to profit on the transfer of Indian title to private entities rather than to the U.S. government. The Salt Lick Reservation controversy was one aspect of this, along with the 1816 and 1817 cessions involving "Colbert's ferry" both of which opened up the most desirable lands along the Tennessee River below the challenging navigation through the Muscle Shoals. Benton wrote in October 1828 that in his search for evidence of criminality he sought out a friend of Isaac Shelby, and "To my great surprize, this person told me in the strictest confidence, that Gov. Shelby had previous to that time, 1824, sought a conversation at his own house in Kentucky on the very subject!!! He told me in 1824, that Shelby had informed him of Jackson's intrigues at the Treaty; how they were carried on by Jackson in person as well as by his friends, a host of whom accompanied him and were seen actively employed until their objects were obtained." James Shelby, son of Isaac Shelby, broadly sustained Benton's allegations, writing in a public letter, "My father, immediately on his return from the Chickasaw Treaty, communicated to his family, that Gen. Jackson's conduct on that occasion had been arrogant and selfish, and as he believed, corrupt. Since his death, several members of his family have made that opinion known to the nation."

== Results ==
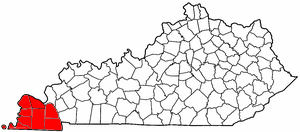
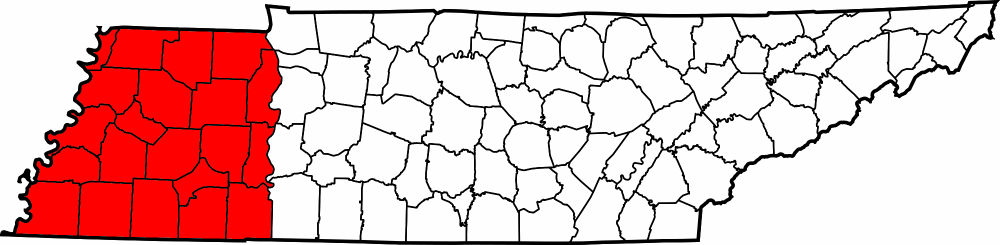

The Treaty of Tuscaloosa was ratified by the Congress and Senate of the United States, and confirmed by President James Monroe on January 7, 1819. With the acquisition, the state of Kentucky gained about 2,000 square miles, and Tennessee was enlarged by about 6,000 square miles.

== Aftermath ==
There was an immediate rush of settlement to the area, sometimes called the Chickasaw Purchase, and within Kentucky, the Jackson Purchase. Jackson, along with John Overton and James Winchester, founded Memphis soon after. By 1824, there were sixteen counties established in the acquired region. In 1825 Jackson made a speech in Jackson, Tennessee about the success of the settlements in the "western lands," crediting Shelby of Kentucky for his role in the negotiations and stating, "To me an inestimable satisfaction is derived from the evidence now offered that the haunts of the Savage man have been exchanged for the cultivated farm," and toasted at a banquet to "the town of Jackson where but lately roamed wild beasts and savages; behold now the abode of civilization, refinement, and hospitality."

== See also ==
- James Brown (Chickasaw)
