= Creek wars =

The Creek wars between the United States and the Muscogee people include:

- Creek War (First Creek War)
- Creek War of 1836 (Second Creek War)
