= The Territorial Papers of the United States =

Annotated primary-source documents (1934–1975)

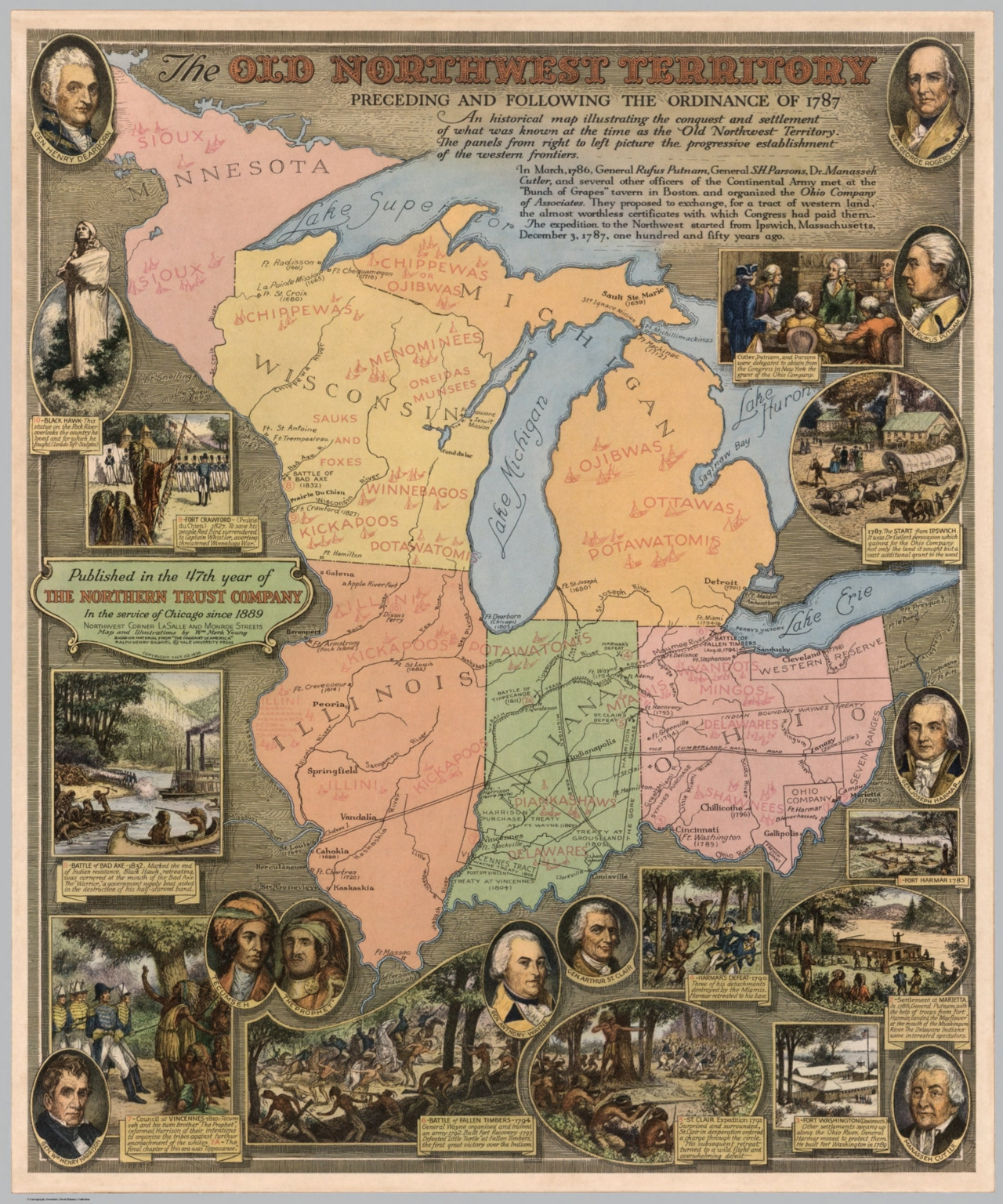
"The Old Northwest Territory" (1936)

The Territorial Papers of the United States is an 28-volume series of annotated primary source records from the period when newly annexed lands were organized territories, before being admitted as U.S. states (for example, the polities of Northwest Territory and Michigan Territory preceded Michigan). The published volumes cover only "small fraction of the documentation on territories." The series covers "the administration of the territories up to 1848," which geographically encompasses "the Appalachian mountains through the first tier of states west of the Mississippi." According to a 2021 blog post by U.S. National Archives and Records Administration, the series was "never completed."

== History ==
The series was initiated with a Congressional appropriation in 1925, with administration by the U.S. Department of State beginning in 1926 (although it drew on records from multiple branches, departments, and agencies including the House and the Senate, Department of War, the Department of the Treasury, and the Post Office Office Department, etc.). The project began at State in part because "Until 1873 the administration of the territories was in the general charge of the Department of State, and the department's files therefore contain a good many relevant documents." The project was transferred to the U.S. National Archives and Records Administration in 1950. The National Archives has collated and microfilmed additional territorial records and created finding aids for those materials.

According to Clarence E. Carter, interest in editing and publishing key territorial records was largely fueled by "the issuance by the Carnegie Institution of Washington in 1911 of David W. Parker's Calendar of Papers in Washington Archives Relating to the Territories of the United States (to 1873)." Carter wrote in 1945, "The territories of the United States bore a relation to the federal government analogous in many respects to the relations of the American colonies to the British government. Consequently, the bulk of the official records pertaining to our territories was in the federal archives...the internal history of the individual territories, were, on the whole a closed book and would remain so unless a program for their publication in some systematic order should be undertaken."

The first editor was Newton D. Mereness, aided by staff, beginning from 1925. The series was edited by Clarence E. Carter from 1931 until his death in 1961, 10 years into his mandatory retirement, "with his salary reduced by the amount of his pension check." Beginning in 1964, John Porter Bloom edited the volumes on Wisconsin Territory, which were the last two volumes published, both in the 1970s.

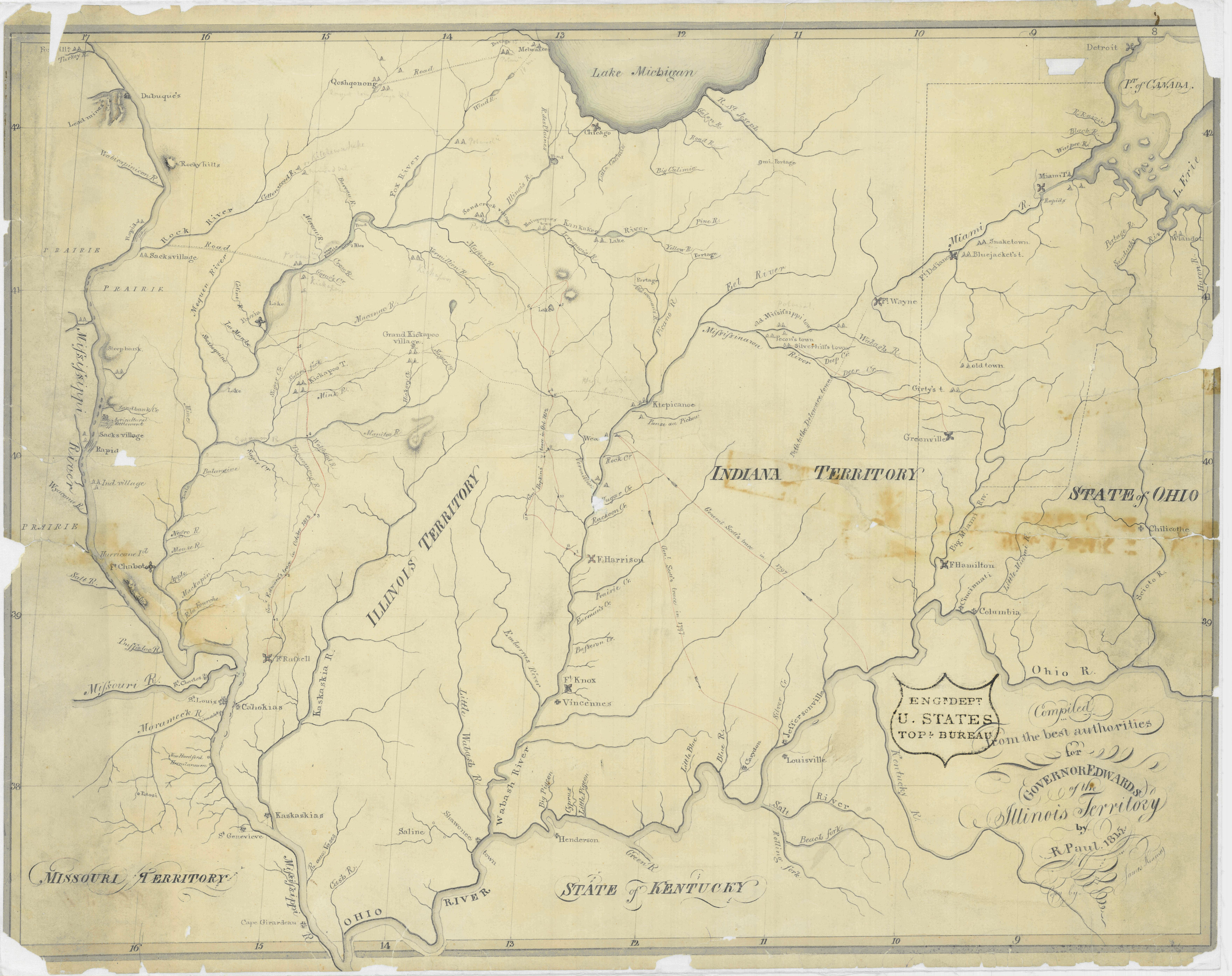
Missouri Territory Indiana Territory, Illinois Territory, and U.S. states of Ohio and Kentucky (1815)

The regions covered are Territory Northwest of the River Ohio, the Territory South of the River Ohio, Mississippi Territory, Indiana Territory, Orleans Territory, Michigan Territory, Illinois Territory, Louisiana-Missouri Territory, Alabama Territory, Arkansas Territory, Florida Territory, and Wisconsin Territory. The territories have been subdivided into three "empires" by at least one historian; the Territorial Papers covers the first era of U.S. territorial evolution, but does not carry forward to the second imperial expansion of 1848 to 1897, encompassing "the Great Plains, the Rocky Mountains, and the Pacific slope," or the third, oceanic empire of 1897 to 1959, including Alaska, and Pacific and Caribbean islands. (Note: There is no coverage for Iowa Territory, Oregon Territory, Minnesota Territory, New Mexico Territory, Utah Territory, Washington Territory, Kansas Territory, Nebraska Territory, Colorado Territory, Nevada Territory, Dakota Territory, Arizona Territory, Idaho Territory, Montana Territory, Wyoming Territory, Oklahoma Territory, Hawaii Territory, Alaska Territory, or any other territories lying outside the North American continent.) Per Carter, the depth and content of papers available varied widely, with a major factor being the relative age or youth of the territory, such that, "For the Territory of Wisconsin, as an example, we encounter some 190 series of documents, each containing pertinent papers, while less than 50 series were found of any importance for such early territories as Mississippi and Indiana." The volumes published have "less relative emphasis...upon papers illustrating Indian affairs than those which pertain to other aspects of territorial history," in part because the quantity of material was "so enormous" and scattered through the archives of the Department of the Interior, Bureau of Indian Affairs, and Department of War.

Volume one (1934), pages 3 to 44, includes a list of all territorial appointments, including governors, secretaries, and judges, made from 1789 to 1872.

== See also ==
- History of the United States (1815–1849)
- Historical regions of the United States
- Territorial evolution of the United States
- List of the United States treaties § U.S.–Native American treaties

== Sources ==
- Buck, Solon (January 1, 1962). "Clarence E. Carter, 1881–1961". The American Archivist. 25 (1): 59–60. doi:10.17723/aarc.25.1.n7181401581753x2. ISSN 0360-9081. JSTOR 40290927.
- Carter, Clarence E. (April 1945). "The Territorial Papers of the United States". The American Archivist. 8 (2): 122–135. ISSN 0360-9081.
- ——— (December 1955). "The Territorial Papers of the United States: A Review and a Commentary". The Mississippi Valley Historical Review. 42 (3): 510–524. doi:10.2307/1898368. JSTOR 1898368.
- Hall, Kermit L. (July 1981). "Hacks and Derelicts Revisited: American Territorial Judiciary, 1789–1959". The Western Historical Quarterly. 12 (3): 273. doi:10.2307/3556588.
