= Convention with the Cherokee =

1816 U.S.–Cherokee treaty

- Name: Convention with the Cherokee
- Tribe, as named (Endonym): Cherokee (ᏣᎳᎩ, Tsalagi)
- Nations: Cherokee Nation (Oklahoma); Eastern Band of Cherokee Indians (North Carolina); United Keetoowah Band of Cherokee Indians (Oklahoma)
- Date agreement signed: March 22, 1816
- Date Senate approved: April 4, 1816 (14th Congress)
- Date administration signed: April 8, 1816 (Presidency of James Madison)
- Date proclaimed: April 18, 1816
- Ratified treaty number(s): 76, 77
- Statue(s): 7 Stat. 138, 7 Stat. 139
- Indian Affairs: "Treaty with the Cherokee, 1816 (2 documents)". Vol. II. pp. 124–126.
- NAID: Treaty instrument - 162246305; Legislative advise and consent - 162246502; Executive ratification - 162246501
- Cession number(s) (ArcGIS layers): 76
- Royce map(s): Pl. CLXI: Tennessee and Portions of Bordering States - Plate 161 - LOC 54 of 67
- Tribal representatives: John Lowry; Richard Taylor; Major John Walker; John Ross Major Ridge; Cheucunsene (Young Dragging Canoe)
- US representatives: George Graham
- Witnesses: Return J. Meigs Sr.; Jacob Laub; Gid. Davis
- Related agreements: Treaty of Fort Jackson; Treaty of Turkeytown

The Convention with the Cherokee was an 1816 treaty between Cherokee tribal leadership and the United States government. Signed in March 1816, the treaty was ratified by the United States Senate on April 8, 1816. The Cherokee sold land in South Carolina partially bounded by the Chauga River (a Tugaloo River tributary) for $5,000 and "secured U.S. acceptance of the Cherokee claim to four million acres of land in Georgia and Alabama that had been taken from the Creeks by the 1814 Treaty of Fort Jackson."

The treaty was a successful attempt by the Cherokee to reclaim land ceded in present-day Alabama by the Muscogee under the Treaty of Fort Jackson following the defeat of the Red Sticks in the Andrew Jackson-led Creek War. This agreement (temporarily) forestalled the sale of some of the Creek-ceded land to real estate investors through the United States General Land Office. Jackson strongly opposed the March 22 treaty, writing James Monroe outlining his grievances on May 12. There was a public meeting in Nashville in June 21 condemning the same instrument.

The Cherokee had an "agreement signed by the two tribes and linked them by a short narrative suggesting that when the Creeks agreed to allow Cherokee settlement pending resolution of the boundary they, in effect, acquiesced to the Cherokee proposals." Jackson sent a letter to Treasury Secretary William H. Crawford stating that the U.S. government misunderstood the Treaty of Fort Jackson agreement; Crawford wrote back:

I am very far from believing that we have yielded any thing to the Cherokees, which they had not a right to demand...There is, therefore, no inducement to reexamine this subject, or to question its validity. In an enlightened nation, submission to the laws is the fundamental principle upon which the social compact must rest. No apprehension is entertained of the consequences which you appear to forebode. The treaty with the Cherokees, has been approved by the Senate and House of Representatives, and is the supreme law of the land. Submission to it is a duty which will not be neglected.

Land ceded by the Creeks in 1814

Jackson used the treaty as an opportunity to attack fellow presidential aspirant William H. Crawford to southern voters. The Alabama and Georgia claims were extinguished by a treaty signed September 14, 1816, known as the Treaty of the Chickasaw Council House (Cherokee) or the Treaty of Turkeytown. Jackson used the "tried-and-true method of bribery of the chiefs and interpreters...Cherokees gave up most of the land obtained by the earlier treaty" for $6,000 annually for ten years, plus a one-time payment of $5,000 upon ratification. Under the March 22 agreement, "There was no provision for an annuity...only $25,500 spoliations." Jackson wrote to his wife Rachel on September 18 complaining "of the 'trouble & cost' he had been put to by 'the rashness, folly, & Ignorance of a great little man' (possibly a reference to [James Madison])."

== See also ==
- Cherokee treaties
- List of the United States treaties § U.S.–Native American treaties
- Lewis Dillahunty § Alabama pioneer

== Sources ==
- Hoig, Stan (1999). The Cherokees and Their Chiefs: In the Wake of Empire. University of Arkansas Press. doi:10.1353/book.124501. ISBN 978-1-61075-096-7. LCCN 98028930. OCLC 39339397.
- Jackson, Andrew (2002). Moser, Harold; Clift, J. Clint; Wells, Wyatt (eds.). The Papers of Andrew Jackson, Volume VI, 1825–1828. University of Tennessee Press. doi:10.7290/utp7151. ISBN 978-1-57233-174-7.
