= National Register of Historic Places listings in Franklin County, Alabama =

Location of Franklin County in Alabama

This is a list of the National Register of Historic Places listings in Franklin County, Alabama.

This is intended to be a complete list of the properties and districts on the National Register of Historic Places in Franklin County, Alabama, United States. Latitude and longitude coordinates are provided for many National Register properties and districts; these locations may be seen together in a Google map.

There are three properties and districts listed on the National Register in the county.

This National Park Service list is complete through NPS recent listings posted January 16, 2026.

	Name on the Register	Image	Date listed	Location	City or town	Description
1	Alabama Iron Works		August 3, 1977 (#77000203)	South of Russellville off U.S. Route 43; 34°27′53″N 87°46′40″W	Russellville	
2	Overton Farm	Overton Farm	October 3, 1973 (#73000344)	4 miles (6.4 km) northwest of Hodges; 34°23′05″N 87°57′30″W	Hodges	
3	Russellville Commercial Historic District	Russellville Commercial Historic District	January 29, 2019 (#100003123)	Along sections of Jackson & Coffee Aves., Lawrence, Lauderdale & Madison Sts. 34°30′19″N 87°43′49″W	Russellville	

== See also ==
- List of National Historic Landmarks in Alabama
- National Register of Historic Places listings in Alabama
