= Russellville Commercial Historic District =

- U.S. National Register of Historic Places
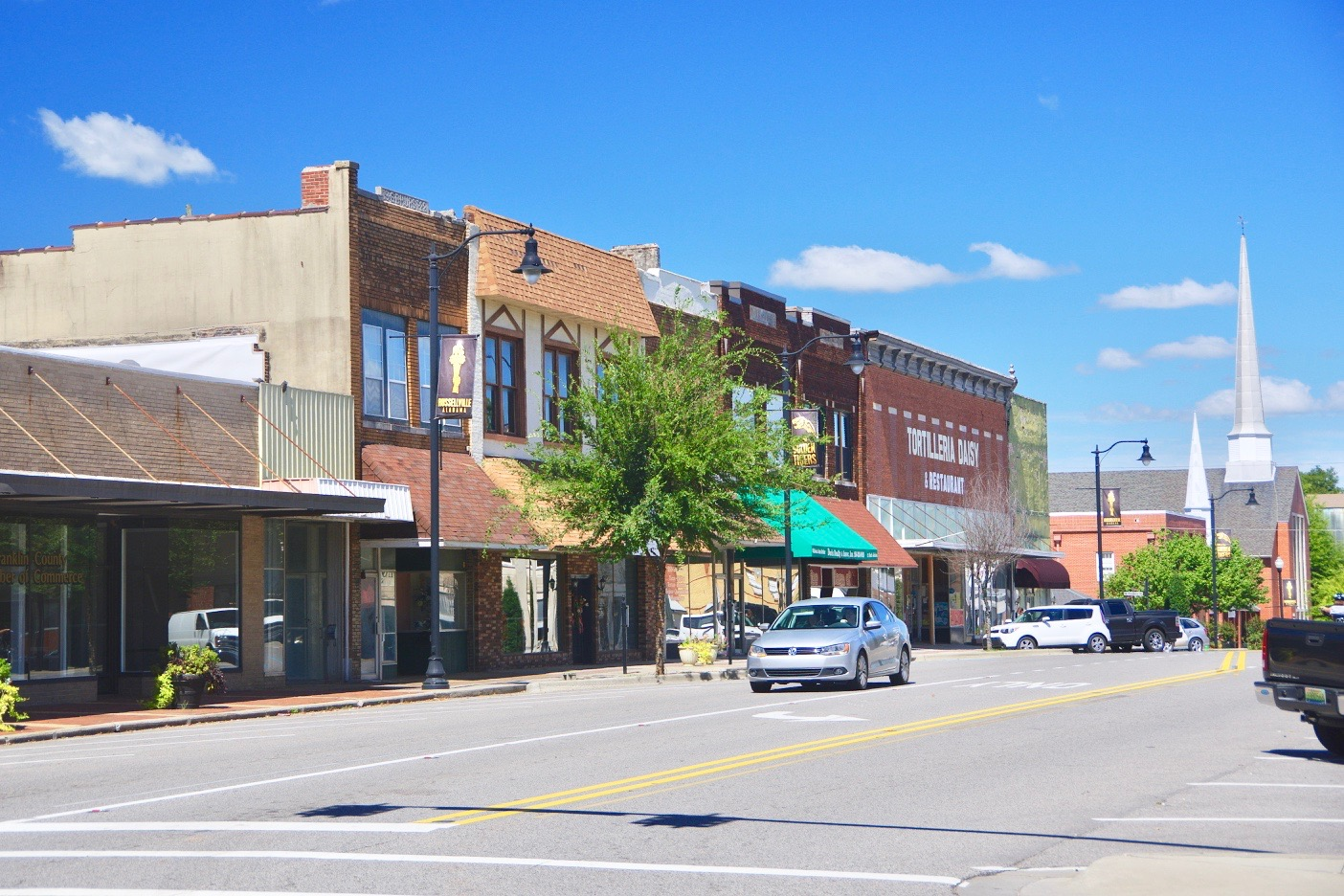
- Buildings along Jackson Avenue in September 2018
- Interactive map of Russellville Commercial Historic District
- Location: Along sections of Jackson & Coffee Aves., Lawrence, Lauderdale & Madison Sts., Russellville, Alabama
- NRHP reference No.: 100003123
- Added to NRHP: January 29, 2019

The Russellville Commercial Historic District, in Russellville, Alabama, United States, is a historic district which was listed on the National Register of Historic Places in 2019.

== History ==
Russellville was incorporated in 1819 on former Chickasaw lands. The town was built about 5 miles (8.0 km) northeast of the Cedar Creek Furnace and at the intersection of the Gaines Trace and Jackson's Military Road. It was named the county seat of Franklin County in 1820, but lost the seat to the more centrally located Frankfort in 1849. After Colbert County was split from Franklin County, the seat returned to Russellville in 1891.

Development of the town increased with the construction of the Northern Alabama Railway through the county in 1886. The growth, driven by iron and limestone mining, continued until the Great Depression. Development continued after World War II, but the construction of a bypass on U.S. Highway 43 drew businesses away from downtown.

Russellville's 2017 Downtown Redevelopment Plan identified a twelve block area including 117 buildings as a historic "downtown core" area. There was interest in creating a National Register listing in order to make renovations in the district eligible for 20% tax credits.

== Architecture ==
Most of the buildings in the district date from the early 20th century, as fires in 1908, 1915, and 1921 destroyed many early buildings. An office building at 101 North Jackson Avenue, built in 1899, is the oldest extant building, though it is covered in a 1962 façade. Most of the 1900s through 1920s buildings were built in simple brick style, though some show Italianate and Neoclassical detailing. Significant later buildings include the Colonial Revival post office, constructed in 1934 by the Works Progress Administration, and the Art Moderne Roxy Theatre, built in 1949. The current county courthouse was built in 1955 on the site of the 1892 courthouse that was destroyed by fire.
