= Treaty of the Chickasaw Council House =

Treaty of the Chickasaw Council House may refer to:

- Treaty of the Chickasaw Council House (Cherokee), signed September 14, 1816
- Treaty of the Chickasaw Council House (Chickasaw), signed September 20, 1816
