= Treaty of the Chickasaw Council House (Chickasaw) =

1816 treaty

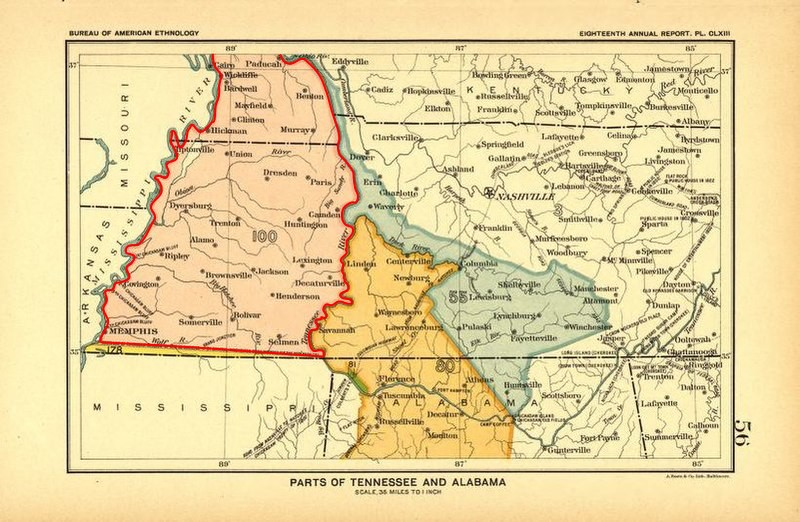
Land in orange was ceded under the treaty

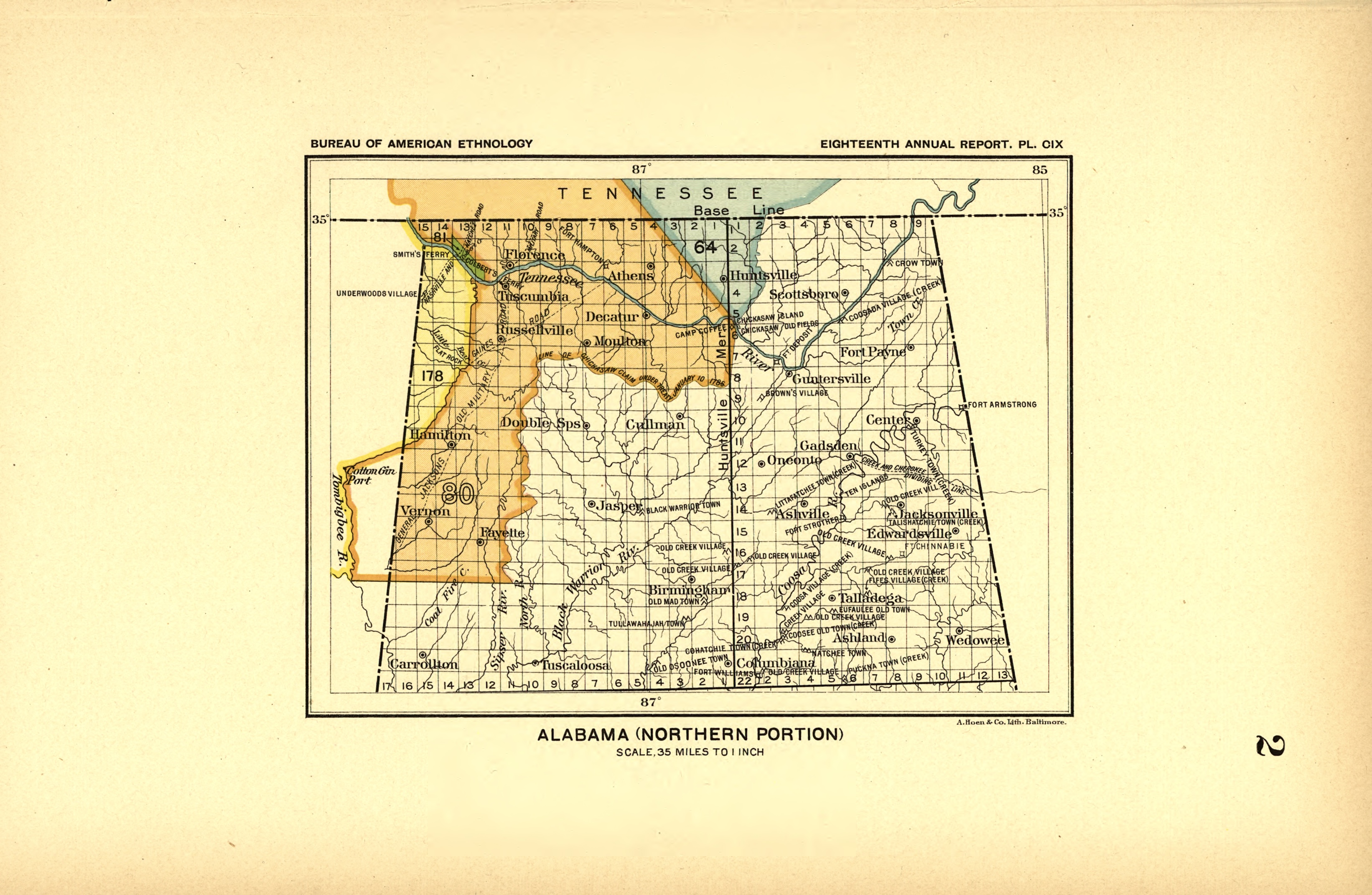
Northern Alabama map from Indian Land Cessions in the United States

The Treaty of the Chickasaw Council House (Chickasaw) was signed September 20, 1816 between people of the Chickasaw nation and United States Indian agents. The negotiations were held at George Colbert's house, which was a compromise between Jackson, who wanted the negotiations to be in Davidson County, Tennessee, and the nations wanted the discussion to take place in their home villages.

The treaty ceded land in present-day middle Tennessee and Alabama. The American commissioners were Andrew Jackson, David Meriwether, and Jesse Franklin. Special land grants were made to George Colbert and Levi Colbert, Chickasaw leaders whose cooperation was essential to the Americans. The reserve for George Colbert was located "in west Lauderdale County" and "covered several miles of riverfront, rich alluvial bottoms, and the north end of his ferry".

John Rhea, once and future U.S. Representative from Tennessee, wrote to president James Madison, reporting "On last friday was concluded a treaty by the Commissioners of the United States and Chiefs principal men and Wariors of the Chickasaw nation, by which treaty, some reservations excepted, is ceded to the United States, the right & claim of the Chickasaw nation to all the lands by them claimed on the north side of Tennessee river, and also of and to all the lands by them claimed East of a line beginning at the mouth of Covy Creek on South side of Tennessee river—thence up said Creek and one of its branches thence to Gains’s road, with it to the Cotton Gin port, thence down the West bank of the Tombigby river to the Choctaw boundary, with some small reservations of land, and stipulation for payments for improvements on either side Tennessee river...a vast tract of Country is disencumbered and freed from Indian claim, and will soon be covered with Citizens of the United States from the southern boundary of Tennessee State to Mobille".

Historians have also argued that outright bribes, such as US$4,500 (equivalent to $94,647 in 2025) paid to Levi Colbert in 1818, made the treaty possible. Current scholarship asserts that the site of the council house was the home of George Colbert, located near present day Tupelo, Mississippi, which researchers believe hosted the Convention of Southern Tribes, "where Andrew Jackson met with over 75 headmen from the Chickasaw, Cherokee, and Choctaw nations, including the famous Cherokee leader Sequoyah and the Choctaw chiefs Pushmataha and Mushulatubbee". The house was constructed beginning around 1804, and served as the Chickasaw council house from about 1814 to 1821, and was replaced in 1850 by what was called the Walker House.

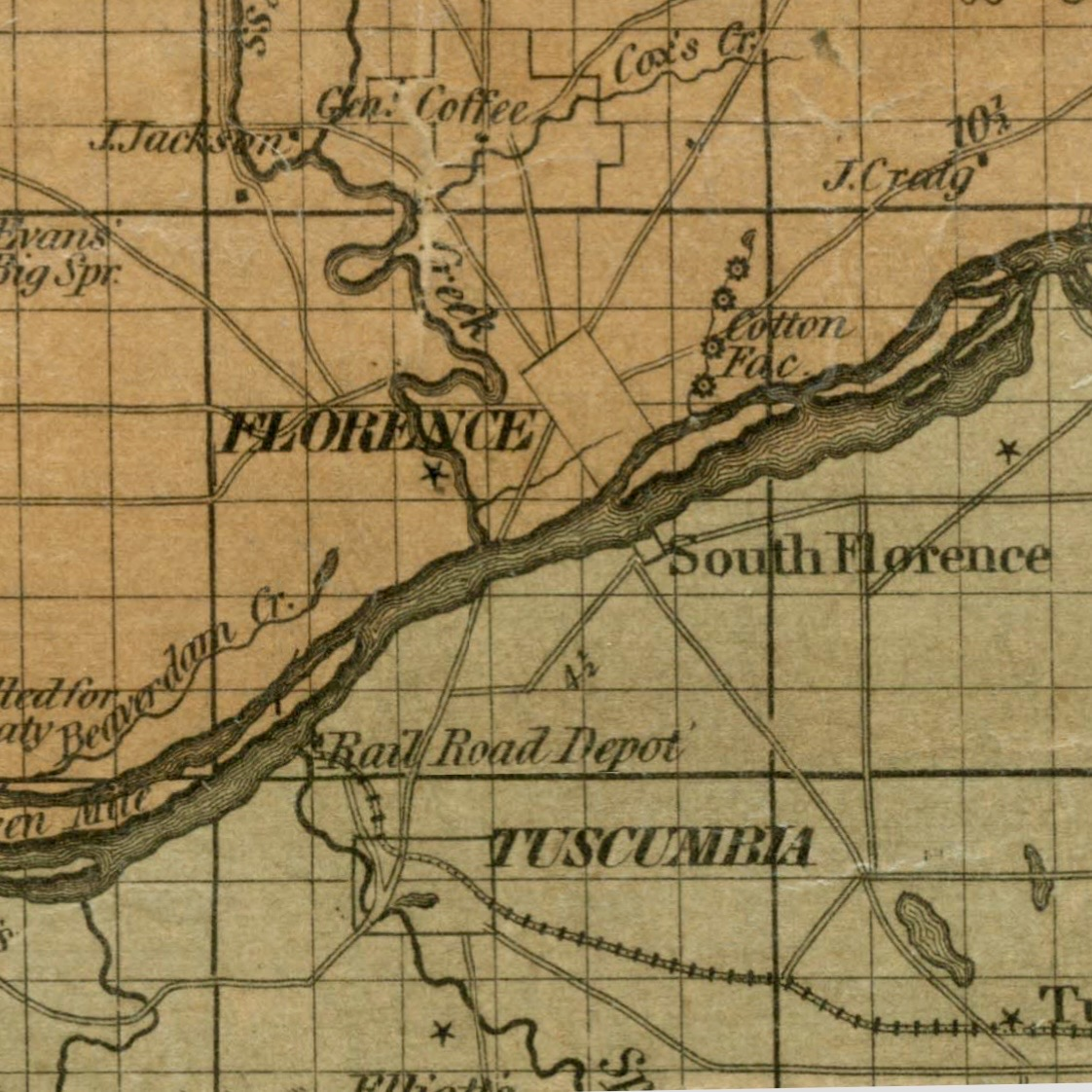
Detail from Sheet 4, An Accurate Map of the State of Alabama and West Florida (1837) by John La Tourrette showing plantations of John Coffee and James Jackson's Forks of Cypress

Several long-time Andrew Jackson affiliates were among the Cypress Land Company's seven founding trustees (Thomas Bibb, John Childress, John Coffee, James Jackson, John McKinley, Dabney Morriss, and Leroy Pope), which owned, platted, and marketed the town of Florence where Jackson's Military Road crossed the Tennessee. (On March 3, 1837, Jackson's last full day in office as President of the United States he appointed McKinley and his lifelong friend and former U.S. Senator William Smith to be Associate Justices of the U.S. Supreme Court.)

== See also ==
- Treaty of Tuscaloosa
- Andrew Jackson and land speculation in the United States
- Andrew Jackson's plantations in northern Alabama

== Sources ==
- Atkinson, James R. (2010). Splendid Land, Splendid People: The Chickasaw Indians to Removal. Tuscaloosa: University of Alabama Press. ISBN 978-0-8173-8337-4.
- Doherty, Raymond (August 1, 2022). "The Colbert-Walker Site (22Le1048): History and Archaeology of a Chickasaw Home, Council House, and Travelers' Stand". Electronic Theses and Dissertations. University of Mississippi.
- Rice, Turner (1975a). "Andrew Jackson and His Northwest Alabama Interests". Journal of Muscle Shoals History. 3. University of North Alabama. Florence, Alabama: Tennessee Valley Historical Society: 3–12. ISSN 0094-8039. LCCN 74646773. OCLC 1795446.
