= Calhoun Treaty =

Cherokee–US treaty, 1819

- Name: Treaty of Washington (1819)
- Alternative name(s): Calhoun Treaty
- Tribe, as named: Cherokee
- Endonym: ᏣᎳᎩ (Tsalagi)
- Nations: Cherokee Nation (Oklahoma); Eastern Band of Cherokee Indians (North Carolina); United Keetoowah Band of Cherokee Indians (Oklahoma)
- Agreement signed: February 27, 1819
- Senate approved: March 3, 1819 (15th Congress)
- President signed: March 3, 1819 (Presidency of James Monroe)
- Date proclaimed: March 10, 1819
- Ratified treaty: 106
- Statue(s): 7 Stat. 195
- Indian Affairs: "Treaty with the Cherokee, 1819". Vol. II. pp. 177–181.
- NAID: Treaty instrument (100565174); Legislative advise and consent (100565185); Executive ratification (100565180)
- Cession number(s) & Digitreaties map(s) (ArcGIS layers): 101; 102; 103; 104; 105; 106; 107; 108; 109
- Royce map(s) (LOC): Pl. CLXI: Tennessee and Portions of Bordering States - Plate 161 - Image 54 of 67; Pl. CLXII: Tennessee (Detail) - Plate 162 - Image 55 of 67
- Tribal representatives: Charles Hicks; Gideon Morgan Jr.; John Ross; John Walker; George Lowry
- US representatives: John C. Calhoun
- Witnesses: Return J. Meigs; C. Vandeventer; Elias Earle; John Lowry; William L. Lovely; William Smith; George Colville
- Interpreters: James Carey; Richard Taylor
- Related agreements: Jackson–McMinn Treaty

The Calhoun Treaty, also known as the Treaty of Washington and the Treaty of February 27, 1819, was executed in 1819 by John C. Calhoun, then United States Secretary of War, and chiefs and representatives of the Cherokee people.

In November 1818, Joseph McMinn had proposed to purchase all of the land of the Old Nation Cherokee for US$100,000 (equivalent to $2,103,261 in 2025) in exchange for self-deportation west of the Mississippi River but the Cherokee rejected this proposal. Indian agent Return J. Meigs also hoped for total removal, writing to Calhoun, "They have a strong desire to perpetuate their national existence and name, but this can only be done if they remove to the West." However, the combination of Cherokee resistance and the Panic of 1819 "saved" the Cherokee. The financial crisis, "caused in large part by overextended credit for speculation in western land," convinced Calhoun not to seek total expulsion of the Cherokee. McMinn had spent US$80,000 (equivalent to $1,682,609 in 2025) on agreements with the Cherokee, and Calhoun wrote him on December 29, 1818, that the treasury did not have any funds to spare.

In February 1819, McMinn, Charles Hicks, John Ross, and others traveled to Washington, D.C. for further negotiations. The Cherokee ceded 6,000 acres of land. The government agreed to grant 640 acres each to key tribespeople, the ownership of which qualified them for American citizenship.

== Sources ==
- Hoig, Stan (1999). The Cherokees and Their Chiefs: In the Wake of Empire. University of Arkansas Press. doi:10.1353/book.124501. ISBN 978-1-61075-096-7. LCCN 98028930. OCLC 39339397.
- McLoughlin, William Gerald (1986). Cherokee Renascence in the New Republic (ebook ed.). Princeton, N.J.: Princeton University Press. ISBN 978-0-691-04741-6. JSTOR j.ctv39x611. LCCN 86042843. OCLC 13859438. OL 2129522W. Project MUSE book 61052.
