= Cherokee treaties =

The Cherokee have participated in over forty treaties in the past three hundred years.

== Pre-American Revolution ==
Treaty between two Cherokee towns with English traders of Carolina, 1684
Established a steady trade in deerskins and Indian slaves. Cherokee leaders who signed were: the Raven (Corani or Kalanu); Sinnawa the Hawk (Tawodi); Nellawgitchi (possibly Mankiller); Gorhaleke; Owasta; – all from Toxawa; and Canacaught (the Great Conqueror); Gohoma; and Caunasaita of Keowa. In 1690 the first trader established himself among the Cherokee people, and took a native wife. He was Cornelius Doughtery, an Irishman from Virginia. Although contact was limited initially to white traders, important changes began to occur within the Cherokee society as a result. Leadership shifted from priest to warrior, and warriors became hunters for profit. In 1690, the secretary of the colony, James Moore, ventured into the Cherokee country looking for gold. Some Cherokee chiefs visited Charleston in 1693 demanding firearms for their wars against neighboring tribes.
Treaty with South Carolina, 1721
Ceded land between the Santee, Saluda, and Edisto Rivers to the Province of South Carolina.
Treaty of Nikwasi, 1730
Trade agreement with the newly formed royal colony of North Carolina through Alexander Cuming.
Treaty of Whitehall, 1730
"Articles of Trade and Friendship" between the Cherokee and the English colonies. Signed between seven Cherokee chiefs (including Attakullakulla) and George II of Great Britain.
Treaty with South Carolina, 24 November 1755
Ceded land between the Wateree and Savannah Rivers to the Province of South Carolina.
Treaty with North Carolina, 1756
Treaty of alliance during the French and Indian War.
Treaty of Charlestown, 18 December 1761
Ended the Anglo-Cherokee War with the Province of South Carolina.
Treaty of Long-Island-on-the-Holston, 20 November 1761
Ended the Anglo-Cherokee War with the Colony of Virginia.
Treaty of Johnson Hall, 12 March 1768
Guaranteed peace between the Cherokee on one side and the Iroquois, the Seven Confederate Nations, and the Caughnawaga on the other.
Treaty of Hard Labour, 14 October 1768
Ceded land in southwestern Virginia to the British Indian Superintendent, John Stuart.
Treaty of Lochaber, 18 October 1770
Ceded land in the later states of Virginia, West Virginia, Tennessee, and Kentucky to the Colony of Virginia.
Treaty with Virginia, early 1772
Ceded land in Virginia and eastern Kentucky to the Colony of Virginia. This actually seems to have been an 'arrangement' made pursuant to the Treaty of Lochaber in 1771, not a bona fide treaty.
Treaty of Augusta, 1 June 1773
Ceded Cherokee claim to 2,000,000 acres (8,100 km^{2}) between Little and Tugaloo Rivers to the Colony of Georgia.
Treaty of Sycamore Shoals, 14 March 1775
Ceded claims to the hunting grounds between the Ohio and Cumberland Rivers to the Transylvania Land Company.

== Pre-U.S. Constitution ==
Treaty of Dewitt's Corner, 20 May 1777
Ceded the lands of the Cherokee Lower Towns in the State of South Carolina, except for a narrow strip of what is now Oconee County.
Treaty of Fort Henry, 20 July 1777
Confirmed the cession of the lands to the Watauga Association with the States of Virginia and North Carolina.
Treaty of Long-Island-on-the-Holston, 26 July 1781
Peace treaty between the Overhill, Valley, and Middle Towns, and the Overmountain settlers that confirmed former cessions but gave up no additional land.
Treaty of Augusta, 25 May 1783
The Cherokees ceded their lands between the Savannah and Keowee rivers on the east and the Oconee River on the west in Georgia.
Treaty of Long Swamp Creek, 30 May 1783
Confirmed the northern boundary of the State of Georgia with the Cherokee, between the latter and that state, with the Cherokee ceding large amounts of land between the Savannah and Chattachoochee Rivers to the State of Georgia.
Treaty of Pensacola, 30 May 1784
For alliance and commerce between New Spain and the Cherokee and Muscogee.
Treaty of Dumplin Creek, 10 June 1785
Ceded the "territory south of the French Broad and Holston Rivers and west of the Big Pigeon River" and east of the ridge dividing Little River from the Tennessee River to the State of Franklin.
Treaty of Hopewell, 28 November 1785
Ceded lands south of the Cumberland River in north central Tennessee.
Treaty of Coyatee, 3 August 1786
Made with the State of Franklin at gunpoint, this treaty ceded the remaining land north and east of the Little Tennessee River to the ridge dividing it from Little River.

== Post-U.S. Constitution ==
Treaty of Holston, 2 July 1791
Established boundaries between the United States and the Cherokee. Guaranteed by the United States that the lands of the Cherokee have not been ceded to the United States.
Treaty of Philadelphia, 17 February 1792
Supplemented the previous Holston treaty regarding annuities, etc.
Treaty of Walnut Hills, 10 April 1792
Between the Spanish governor in New Orleans and the Cherokee, Muscogee, Choctaw, and Seminole in which the former promised the latter military protection.
Treaty of Pensacola, 26 September 1792
Between the Chickamauga Cherokee (or Lower Cherokee) under John Watts and Arturo O'Neill, governor of Spanish West Florida, for arms and supplies with which to wage war against the United States.
Treaty of Philadelphia, 26 June 1794
Reaffirmed the provisions of the 1785 Treaty of Hopewell and the 1791 Treaty of Holston, particularly those regarding land cession.
Treaty of Tellico Blockhouse, 8 November 1794
Peace treaty with of the United States with the Lower Cherokee ending the Cherokee–American wars.
Treaty of Tellico, 2 October 1798
The boundaries promised in the previous treaty had not been marked and white settlers had come in. Because of this, the Cherokee were told they would need to cede new lands as an "acknowledgment" of the protection of the United States. The U.S. would guarantee the new Cherokee Nation could keep the remainder of its land "forever".
Treaty of Tellico, 24 October 1804
Ceded land.
Treaty of Tellico, 25 October 1805
Ceded land, including that for the Federal Road through the Cherokee Nation.
Treaty of Tellico, 27 October 1805
Ceded land for the state assembly of Tennessee, whose capital was then in East Tennessee, to meet upon.
Treaty of Washington, 7 January 1806
Ceded land.
Treaty of Fort Jackson, 9 August 1814
Ended the Creek War, demanded land from both the Muscogee (Creek) and the Cherokee.
Treaties of Washington, including Convention with the Cherokee, 22 March 1816
Ceded last remaining lands within the territory limits claimed by South Carolina to the state, regained some land ceded by the Muscogee under Treaty of Fort Jackson.
Treaty of Chickasaw Council House, 14 September 1816
Ceding land in northwestern Alabama.

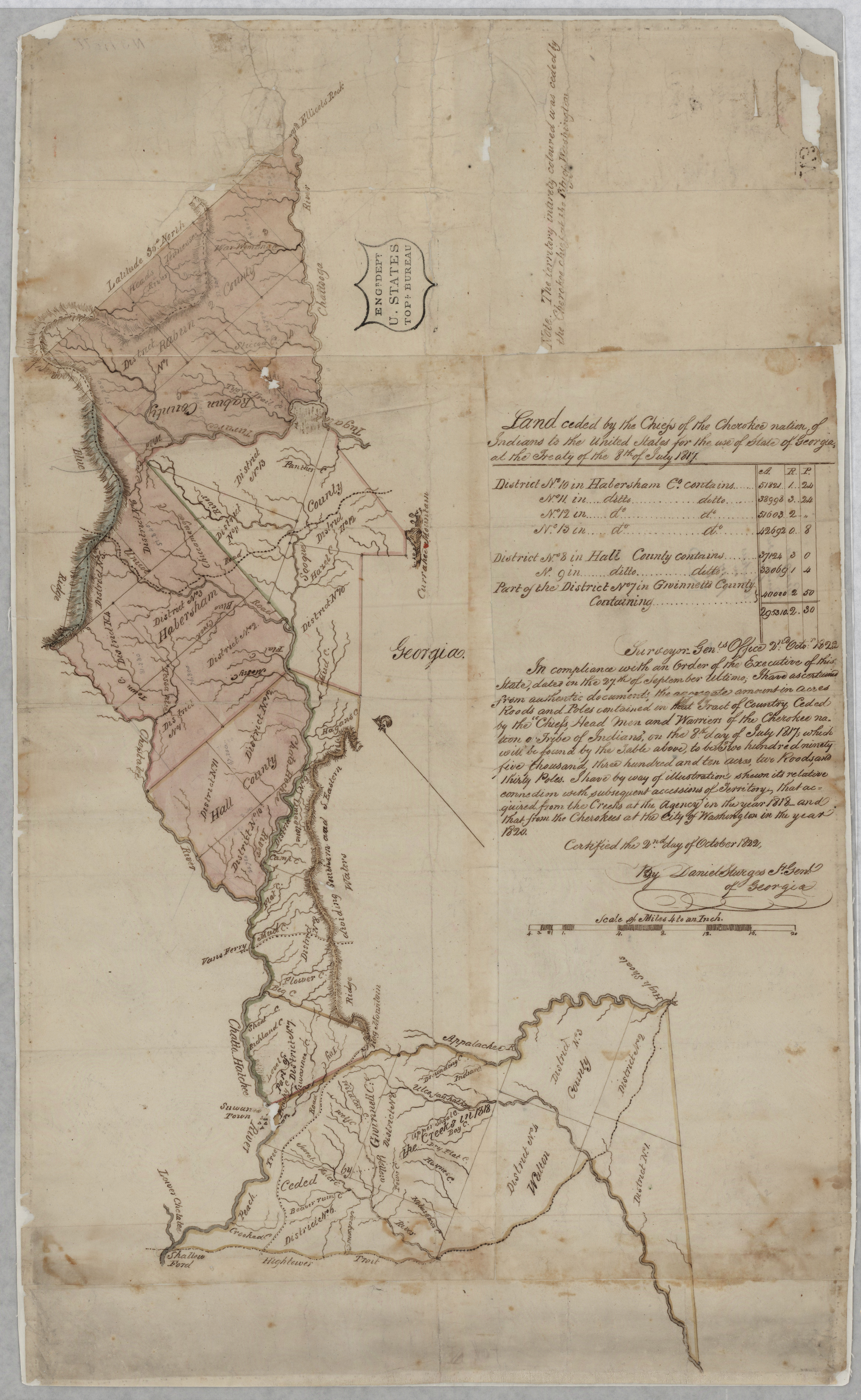
Map of the Treaty of the Cherokee Agency, 8 July 1817

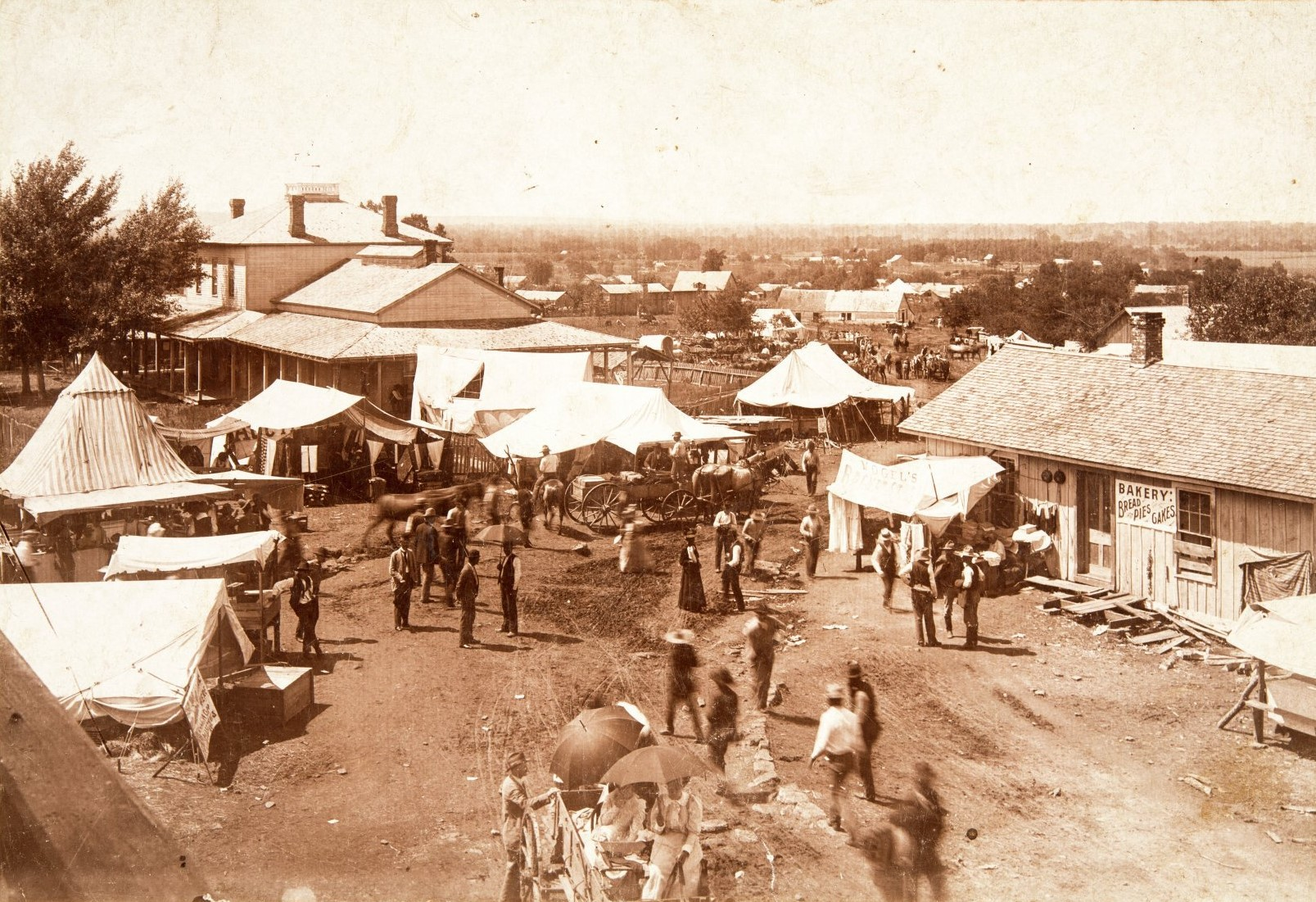
Cherokee treaty payment at Fort Gibson, Oklahoma in 1894.

Treaty of the Cherokee Agency, 8 July 1817
Acknowledged the division between the Upper Towns, which opposed emigration, and the Lower Towns, which favored emigration, and provided benefits for those who chose to emigrate west and 640-acre (2.6 km^{2}) reservations for those who did not, with the possibility of citizenship of the state they are in.
Treaty of Washington, 27 February 1819 (Calhoun treaty)
Reaffirmed the Treaty of the Cherokee Agency of 1817, with a few added provisions specifying land reserves for certain Cherokee.
Council Bluffs Treaty, 11 December 1821
Established a new boundary between the Cherokee and Creek nations. The north boundary was later used in the first survey of Carroll County, Georgia.
Treaty of San Antonio de Bexar, with the Spanish Empire, 8 November 1822
Granted land in the province of Tejas in Spanish Mexico upon which the Texas Cherokee band of Richard Fields and The Bowl could live. Though signed by the Spanish governor of Tejas, the treaty was never ratified, neither by the Viceroyalty of New Spain nor by the succeeding First Mexican Empire or Republic of Mexico.
Treaty of Washington, 6 May 1828
Cherokee Nation West ceded its lands in Arkansas Territory for lands in what becomes Indian Territory.
Treaty of New Echota, 29 December 1835
Surrendered to the United States the lands of the Cherokee Nation East in return for $5,000,000 to be disbursed on a per capita basis, an additional $500,000 is for educational funds, title in perpetuity to an equal amount of land in Indian Territory to that given up, and full compensation for all property left in the East. The treaty is rejected by the Cherokee National Council but approved by the U.S. Senate.
Treaty of Bowles Village with the Republic of Texas, 23 February 1836
Granted nearly 1,600,000 acres (6,500 km^{2}) of east Texas land to the Texas Cherokees and twelve associated tribes. (Violation of this treaty led to the Cherokee War of 1839, during which most Cherokees were driven north into the Choctaw Nation or who fled south into Mexico. Following this bloody episode, remaining Texas Cherokees under Chicken Trotter joined Mexican forces in a guerrilla war, culminating in the invasion of San Antonio by Mexican General Adrian Woll. Cherokee and allied Indians saw action at the Battle of Salado Creek and against the Dawson regiment. Following this conflict, it was apparent that Mexico's intervention was not going to provide the remaining Texas Cherokees with any stability or lands in the Republic of Texas. This led to a push by newly re-installed Texas President Sam Houston for a peace treaty, in 1843).
Treaty of Bird's Fort with the Republic of Texas, 29 September 1843
Ended hostilities among several Texas tribes, including the Cherokees. The Treaty which was ratified by the Congress of the Republic of Texas, recognized the tribal status of the Texas Indians as distinct, including the Cherokees that would later become known as the Texas Cherokees and Associate Bands. President of Texas Sam Houston, adopted son of former Principal Chief of the Cherokee Nation West John Jolly, signed for the republic. This treaty, honored by the State of Texas following annexation, has never been abrogated by the Congress of the United States and in theory is still valid.
Treaty of Tehuacana Creek with the Republic of Texas, 1844
An additional treaty was made in which Chicken Trotter and Wagon Bowles were involved.
Treaty of Washington, 6 August 1846
Ended the covert war between the various factions that had been ongoing since 1839 and attempted to unite the Old Settlers, the Treaty Party, and the Latecomers (or National Party).
Treaty of Fort Smith, Arkansas, 13 September 1865
Recognized the claims of the John Ross party as the legitimate Cherokee Nation vis-a-vis those of the Stand Watie party as well as recognized a temporary cease-fire between the Cherokee, Chickasaw, Choctaw, Comanche, Creek, Osage, Quapaw, Seminole, Seneca, Shawnee, Wichita, and Wyandot, with the United States.
Treaty of the Cherokee Nation, 19 July 1866
Annulled "pretended treaty" with Confederate Cherokees; granted amnesty to Cherokees; established a US district court in Indian Territory; prevented the US from trading in the Cherokee Nation unless approved by the Cherokee council or taxing residents of the Cherokee Nation; established that all Cherokee Freedmen and free African-Americans living in the Cherokee Nation "shall have all the rights of native Cherokees"; established right of way for rivers, railroads, and other transportation their Cherokee lands; allowed for the US to settle other Indian people in the Cherokee Nation; prevented members of the US military from selling alcohol to Cherokees for non-medicinal purposes; ceded Cherokee lands in Kansas; and established boundaries and settlements for various individuals.
Treaty of Washington, 29 April 1868
Supplemented the treaty of 1866 and also ceded the Cherokee Outlet in Indian Territory.
