= General Carroll's Road =

North–south trail in Louisiana–Mississippi

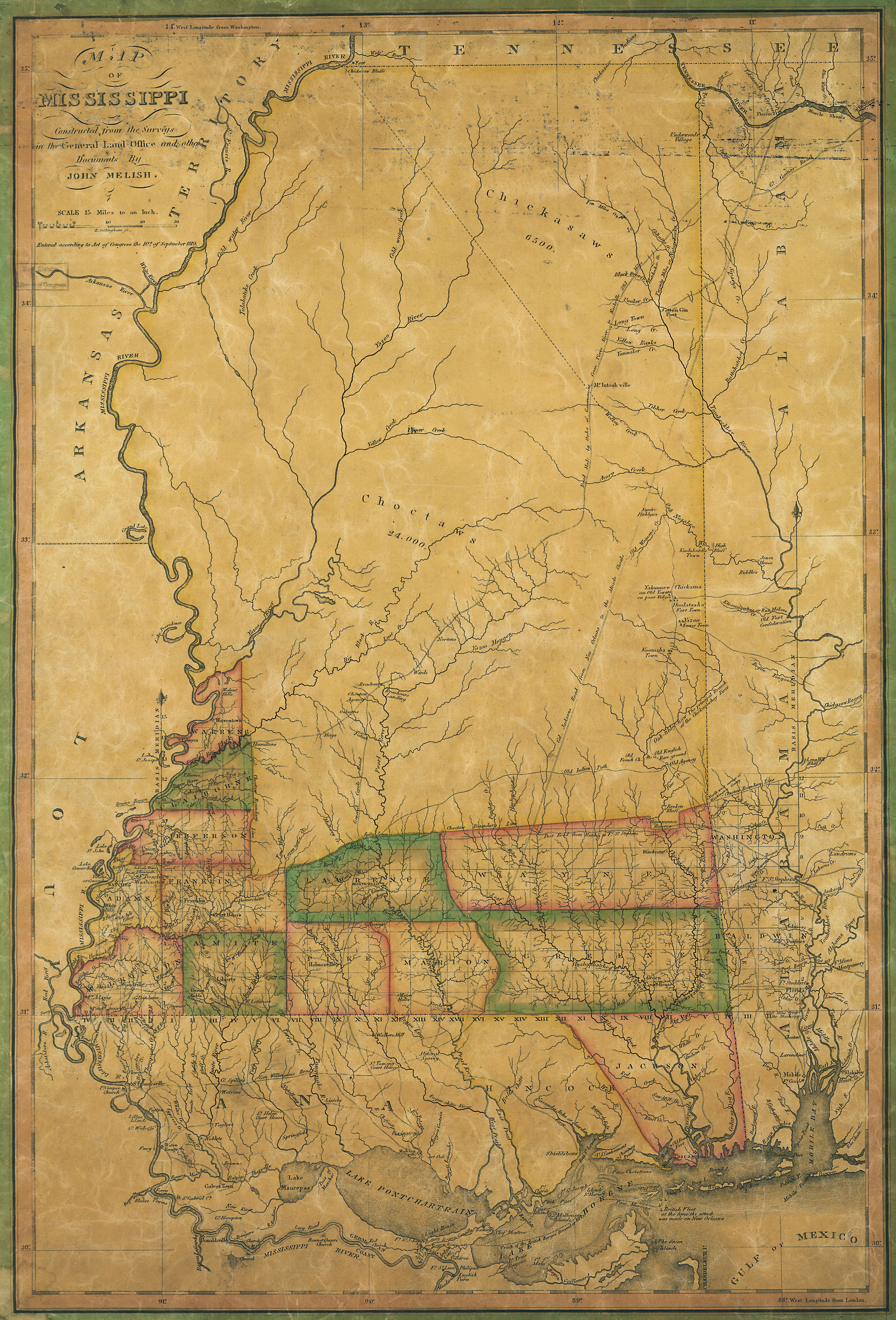
General Carols Road [sic] on the 1819 map by John Melish

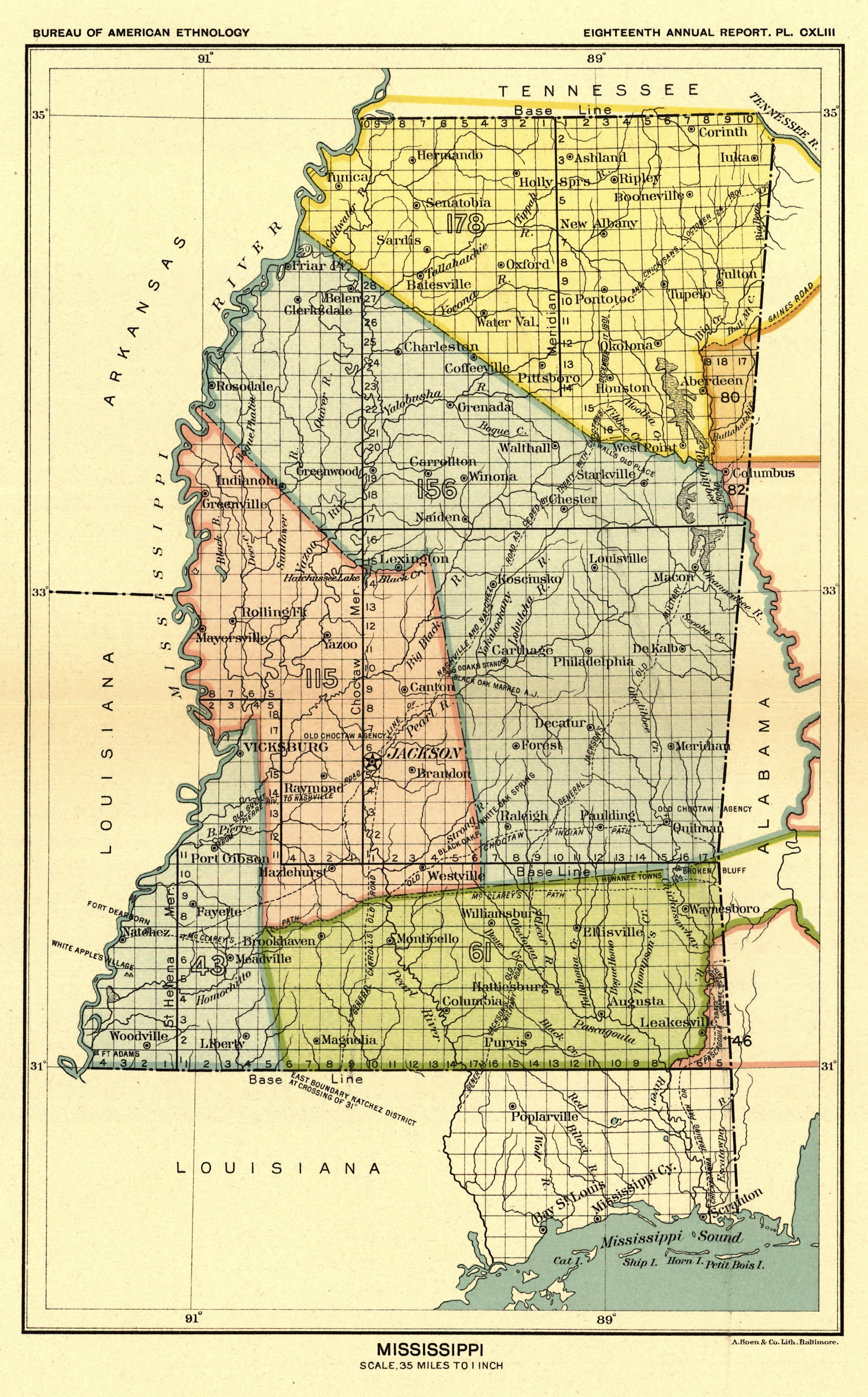
"General Carroll's Old Road" on the Indian Land Cessions map of Mississippi, 1898

General Carroll's Road was a north-south route through Louisiana and territorial-era lower Mississippi in early 19th-century North America. The road connected Lake Pontchartrain to the Choctaw Agency, which was located about five miles north of present-day Jackson, Mississippi. The route was named after William Carroll, and followed an existing route between Madisonville, Louisiana, and Liberty, Mississippi, but the last 125 miles were "blazed out" as a way to get Carroll's men back from the Battle of New Orleans while avoiding Natchez, Mississippi. Once they reached the Choctaw Agency it was a straight shot back up the Natchez Trace to Tennessee. Also known as Carroll's Trace, a fragment was still visible in Copiah County as of 1974. The road was never heavily used even in its frontier heyday because its original purpose of getting Carroll's men home meant they "paid no attention to grades and stream crossings. The Trace goes up and down hills with a 30-degree slope, and it crosses Lick Creek where no road could ever be built to last." Because the roads radiating from Madisonville, on the Tchefuncte River, were also intersected by the east-west General Wilkinson's Road, the town became an important start and end point for travels through what settlers called the "wilderness."

== See also ==
- Jackson's Military Road
