= Jenny McIntosh =

Signer of the Cherokee women's petition

Jenny McIntosh was the first signer of the Cherokee women's petition of May 2, 1817, one of the first collective women's petitions sent to any body in the United States, and arguably the first women's anti-removal petition in U.S. history. She became a landholder under the Treaty of 1817, and later made other innovations in petitioning, authoring one of the first petitions for Native women's equal rights to the Tennessee legislature in 1822.

== Biography ==
McIntosh was the daughter of Ka-ti (Caty) Harlan, a Cherokee woman, and her first husband, John Walker, who was a white trader. She was also the granddaughter of the revered Cherokee leader Nancy Ward, known as the last Beloved Woman, a title for revered women, who were charged as advocates of peace. This placed McIntosh in a lineage of influential Cherokee women who held significant social and political roles within their matrilineal society.

McIntosh was raised in a culture that valued women's voices in governance and community decisions. Her upbringing within a family rooted in Cherokee leadership and tradition, influenced her later activism, including her role as the first signer of the 1817 Cherokee women's petition opposing land cessions to the U.S. government. Like her grandmother, she exercised new forms of minority politics and indigenous diplomacy such as written appeals backed by hundreds and even thousands of signatories.

Ward's property identified in the document of reservation recorded in the United States Archive Record Group number 75 was bequeathed to McIntosh.

She married Thomas Fox Taylor around 1787 and later John McIntosh, with whom she had several children.
