= Cypress Creek (Alabama) =

Tennessee River tributary

Coordinates: 34.7791°N 87.6945°W

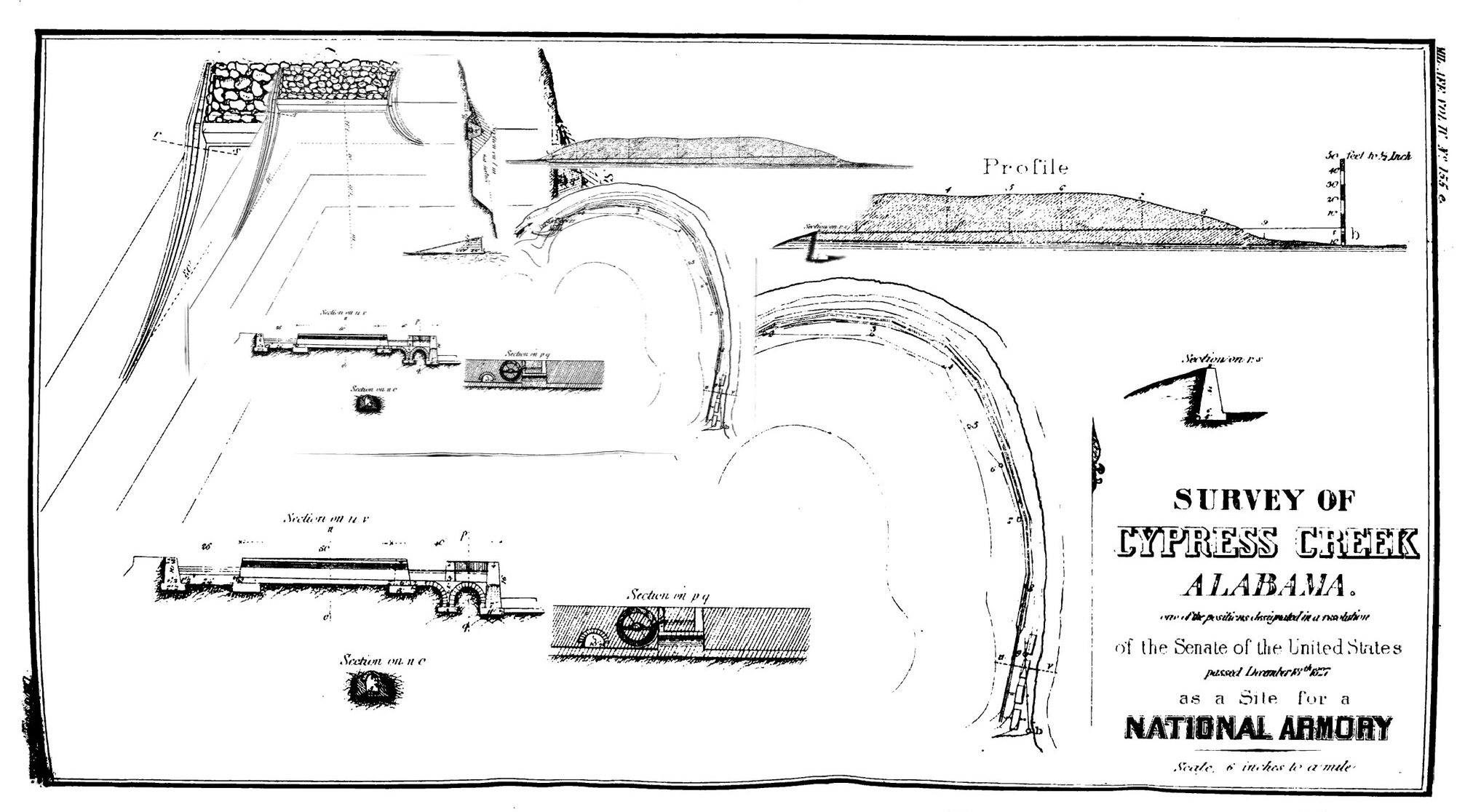
Survey of Cypress Creek Alabama as a site for a National Armory (circa 1816–1828)

Cypress Creek is a watercourse in Alabama, United States, tributary to the Tennessee River. The Cherokee language name for this creek was Te Kee, ta, no-eh and it was the boundary of a land reserve for Chief Doublehead, granted in 1805 by the Cotton Gin Treaty (and extinguished in 1817 by the Jackson and McMinn Treaty). Cypress Creek was proposed as the site of a national armory along Jackson's Military Road and surveyed by the federal government in 1817, 1823, and 1828. The place where two tributaries of the Cypress Creek forked off was the source of the name for the Forks of Cypress plantation of James Jackson, best known today as a place where writer Alex Haley's ancestors were enslaved before the American Civil War.

== Sources ==
- Matrana, Marc R. (2009). Lost Plantations of the South. University Press of Mississippi. ISBN 978-1-57806-942-2.
- Rice, Turner (1975a). "Andrew Jackson and His Northwest Alabama Interests". Journal of Muscle Shoals History. 3. University of North Alabama. Florence, Alabama: Tennessee Valley Historical Society: 3–12. ISSN 0094-8039. LCCN 74646773. OCLC 1795446.
- Rice, Turner (1975b). "The Cypress Land Company: A Dream of Empire". Journal of Muscle Shoals History. 3. University of North Alabama. Florence, Alabama: Tennessee Valley Historical Society: 21–35. ISSN 0094-8039. LCCN 74646773. OCLC 1795446.
