= Byler Road =

- U.S. National Register of Historic Places
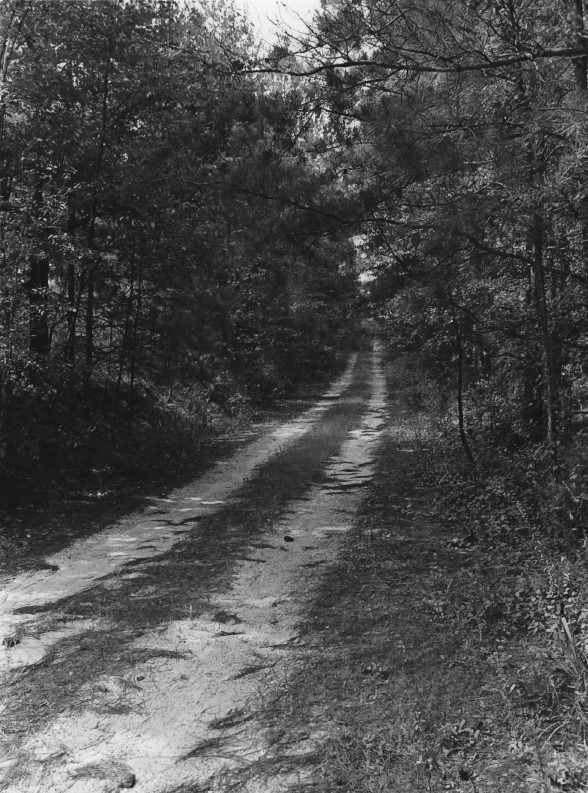
- Byler Road in 1974 in Tuscaloosa County

- Location within Alabama Location within the United States
- Nearest city: Northport, Alabama
- Coordinates: 33°23′20″N 87°35′49″W
- Built: 1822
- NRHP reference No.: 74000438
- Added to NRHP: November 19, 1974

Byler Road is the oldest public road in Alabama still in use today. Constructed in the mid-1820s, it connected Courtland near the Tennessee River with Tuscaloosa near the Black Warrior River.

Byler Road was named for Captain John Byler, who served in Andrew Jackson's army at the Battle of Horseshoe Bend. On December 16, 1819, Governor William W. Bibb signed a bill authorizing Byler and his associates to construct a toll road that would link the Tennessee Valley with the Black Warrior River. Byler would be allowed to keep the tolls from the road for twelve years as long as the road was maintained. The road's northern starting point began at Jackson's Military Road in Lauderdale County. Private investors funded much of the road's construction as the road would allow cotton to be transported from the Tennessee River to the Black Warrior River, then onward to the port at Mobile and Europe. Up to 25 stands were created along the road's length, providing lodging and meals to travelers.

The road spurred development in Lawrence, Winston, Walker, and Fayette counties, and was traveled by both Union and Confederate armies during the Civil War. A half-mile section of the road in Tuscaloosa County was added to the National Register of Historic Places in 1974.

In 2024, the state of Alabama began adding historic markers along the route of Byler Road.
