= Cotton Gin Port, Mississippi =

- Cotton Gin Port Site
- U.S. National Register of Historic Places
- U.S. National Historic Site
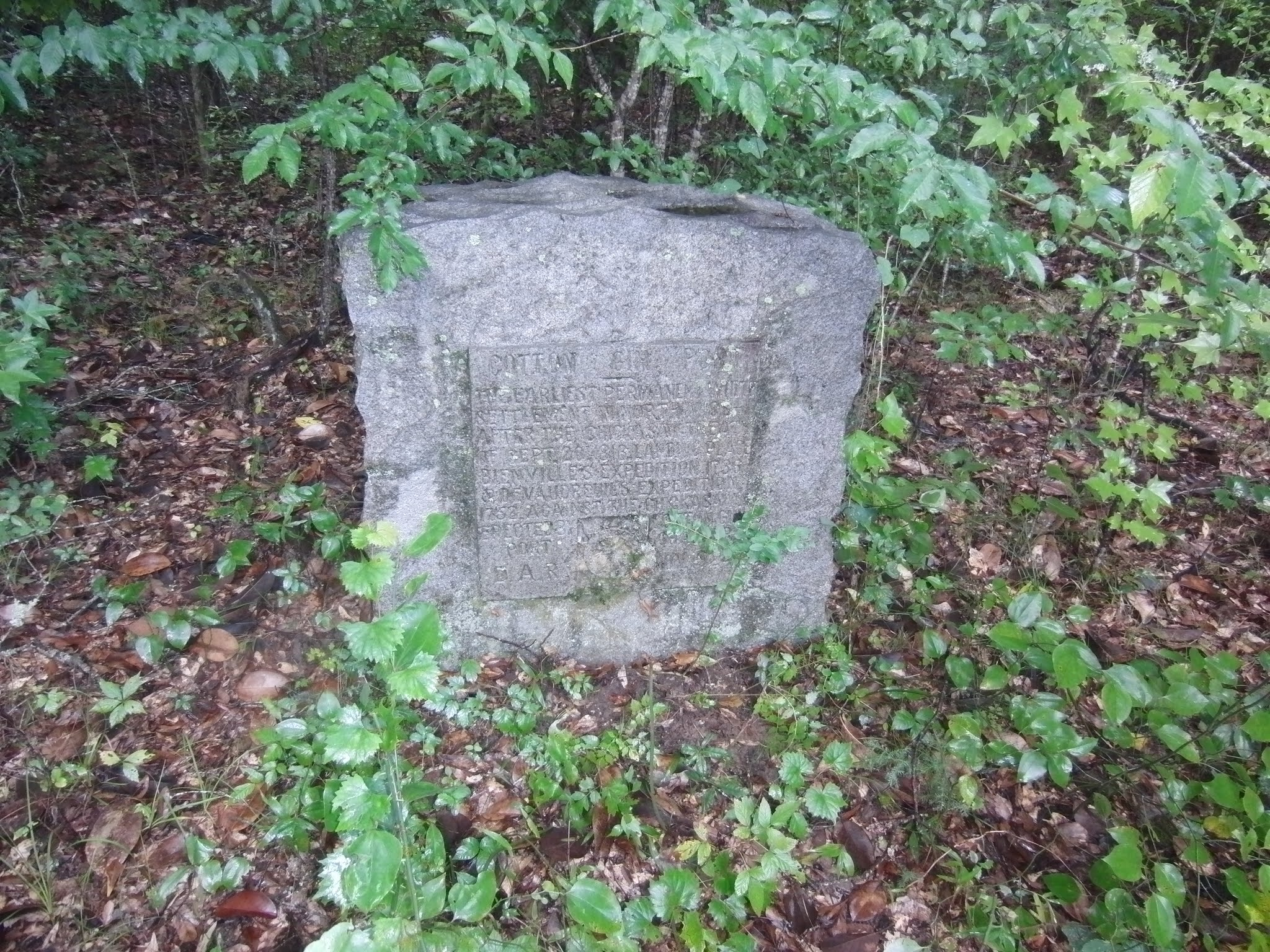
- Historical marker at the Cotton Gin Port Site

- Location within Mississippi Location within the United States
- Nearest city: Amory, Mississippi
- Coordinates: 33°58′15″N 88°32′35″W
- Area: 100 acres (40 ha)
- NRHP reference No.: 72000700
- Added to NRHP: October 18, 1972

Cotton Gin Port is a ghost town in Monroe County, Mississippi, United States.

== Geography ==
Cotton Gin Port was located at 33°58′15″N 88°32′35″W on the east bank of the Tombigbee river.

== History ==
Cotton Gin Port was the first town settled by Europeans in what became north Mississippi. It was developed on the east bank of the Tombigbee River, at a crossing of vital Indian trails. This had been a base of expeditions of French explorers Jean-Baptiste Le Moyne de Bienville in 1736 and Vaudreuil in 1752.

After the United States acquired the territory, it was first considered part of Marion County in the Alabama Territory.

The new demarcation lines of 1820–21 established a state boundary that allocated the town and related area to Mississippi.

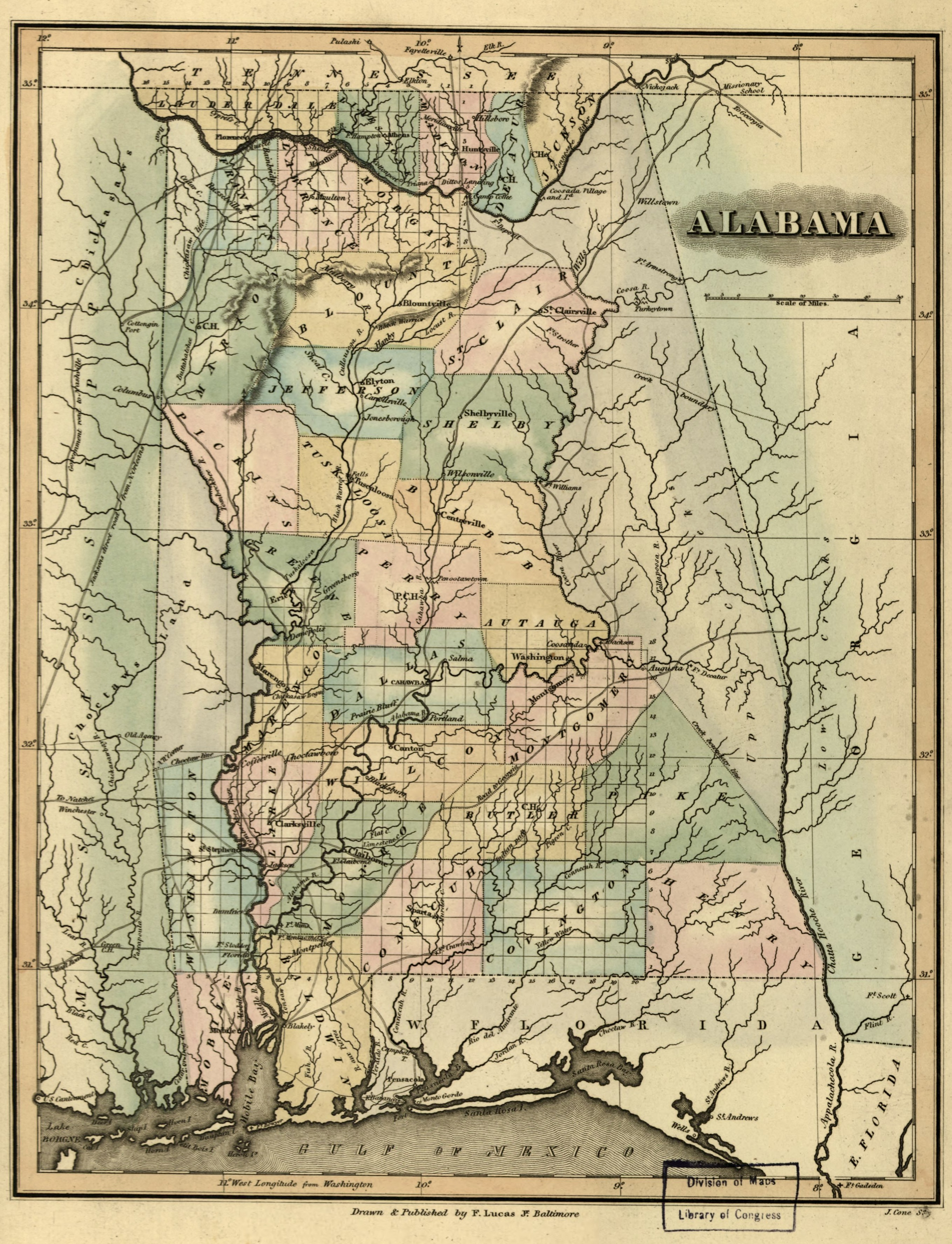
1826 map of Alabama showing road from Muscle Shoals to Cotton Gin Port

The early U.S. government built a cotton gin in 1801 at Cotton Gin Port as part of a "plan of civilization" for the local Chickasaw, whom it wanted to have adopt European-American customs. The settlement soon became recognized as a trading post for business with the Chickasaw. A road, Gaines Trace, was built to the town in 1811 and 1812. This road ran from close to present-day Muscle Shoals on the Tennessee River to Cotton Gin Port, where it crossed the Tombigbee. From there it continued south to Fort Stoddert, Alabama.

The youngest person to die in the Alamo, William Philip King, was born in Cotton Gin Port. His family soon moved to Louisiana, then Texas. He died at 16 years helping to defend the Alamo.

As railroads were constructed in the region, the Kansas City, Memphis & Birmingham Railroad bypassed Cotton Gin Port, and established a new railroad town at Amory, Mississippi. In a pattern repeated in numerous other places, this bypass resulted in the older town being abandoned, as businesses and residents moved to have access to the railroad at Amory.

The ruins of the old town can still be found between the Tenn-Tom Waterway and the Tombigbee River. Relics from the former settlement can be seen at the Amory Municipal Museum. Levi Colbert, a chief of the Chickasaw, is said to have lived on the bluff west of Cotton Gin Port, near a large spreading oak known as the council tree, a meeting place for tribal elders. The former cotton gin was built near here.

== See also ==
- Treaty of the Chickasaw Council House (Chickasaw)
