= John Walker (Cherokee countryman) =

18th- and 19th-century leader

John Walker was a Loyalist Anglo-American who lived with the Chickamauga Cherokee and married a Cherokee wife, resulting in influence within the Cherokee Nation. According to historian Natalie Inman, John Walker was the first husband of Katy, daughter of Nancy Ward. One 18th-century source describes him as a "half-blood." He accompanied John Watts and George Fields in surveilling and attacking Buchanan's Station, near present-day Nashville, on September 30, 1792, along with 83 Creek warriors from Broken Arrow, 30 Shawnee, and 168 Cherokee.

In the early 19th century he was one of several White Cherokee countrymen who "had little allegiance to the new American nation but who wished to protect the wealth they had acquired through trade." He was appointed to the first Cherokee National Committee in 1809. Walker, Major Ridge, and John Lowrey offered Cherokee warriors to aid Andrew Jackson's Tennessee militia in response to the Fort Mims massacre in 1813 that began the Creek War. Gideon Morgan, commanding officer of Col. Morgan's Regiment of Cherokee Indians (under overall command of John Cocke) commended Walker for his action on November 18, 1813 (sometimes called the Hillabee massacre), reporting that Major John Walker captured 54 prisoners at Hillabee town.

Walker was a signatory to the 1816 Convention with the Cherokee. In 1819, at Washington, while drunk, Walker attacked John Ross with a knife because Ross had charged him with accepting a bribe. His son John Walker Jr. was ambushed, shot, and killed in Tennessee in 1834; Ross was suspected of ordering the hit.

== See also ==
- Jenny McIntosh, his daughter

== Sources ==
- Hoig, Stan (1999). The Cherokees and Their Chiefs: In the Wake of Empire. University of Arkansas Press. doi:10.1353/book.124501. ISBN 978-1-61075-096-7. LCCN 98028930. OCLC 39339397.
- Inman, Natalie R. (2017). Brothers and Friends: Kinship in Early America. Early American Spaces. Athens, Georgia: University of Georgia Press. doi:10.1353/book51901. ISBN 978-0-8203-5110-0. LCCN 2016055415. OCLC 985105661.
- Kanon, Tom (2014). Tennesseans at War, 1812–1815: Andrew Jackson, the Creek War, and the Battle of New Orleans. Tuscaloosa: University of Alabama Press. ISBN 9780817318291. LCCN 2013049815. OCLC 900093586. Project MUSE book 30812.
- McLoughlin, William Gerald (1986). Cherokee Renascence in the New Republic (ebook ed.). Princeton, N.J.: Princeton University Press. ISBN 978-0-691-04741-6. JSTOR j.ctv39x611. LCCN 86042843. OCLC 13859438. OL 2129522W. Project MUSE book 61052.
- Wright, Amos J. (2003). Historic Indian towns in Alabama, 1540–1838. Tuscaloosa, Alabama: University of Alabama Press. ISBN 978-0-8173-1251-0.
