= Gideon Morgan =

Tennessee militia officer and businessman (1778–1851)

- Born: August 6, 1778; Connecticut
- Died: September 19, 1851 (aged 73); McMinn County, Tennessee

Gideon Morgan (August 6, 1778–September 17, 1851) was a land owner and businessman of Tennessee, United States. He was connected by marriage to Cherokee (Tsalagi, ᏣᎳᎩ) chiefs John Walker and George Lowrey. He led Col. Morgan's Regiment of Cherokee Indians during the Creek War, most notably at the Battle of Horseshoe Bend. He was one of the Cherokee signatories to the 1819 "Calhoun treaty" with the United States.

== Early life and family ==
Morgan was born in Connecticut. Morgan came from Virginia with his father Gideon Morgan and brothers Calvin Rufus Morgan, Luther Morgan, and George Morgan. The senior Gideon Morgan was a Continental Army soldier from Connecticut who spent some time in New York before settling in Virginia and then relocating to East Tennessee. The landmarked Col. Gideon Morgan House in Kingston, Tennessee is named for his father, who lived from 1751 to 1830. From 1814 to 1817, the Morgans frequently shipped salt, plaster, and iron from the Boatyard on the Tennessee River to their store in Knoxville.

According to genealogist Zella Armstrong: "Joseph Sevier Jr. married for his second wife, Elizabeth Lowrey, daughter of George Lowrey, a Scotchman, and Ocatlootsa, who was a daughter of the great chief Oconstoto. A few years after this marriage Joseph Sevier died, and his widow, Elizabeth Lowrey, married for her second husband, John Walker, supposed to be an Englishman, although Governor Blount, calls him a half-breed. A son of this marriage was John Walker Jr., who became famous for his elopement with Elizabeth Meigs." Joseph Sevier Jr. and Elizabeth Lowrey had two daughters. The elder, Margaret Sevier, married Gideon Morgan and had three children: Gideon Morgan, Elizabeth Lowry Morgan, and Cherokee America Morgan. Marriage to Indigenous people and within Indigenous communities was at this time not generally recognized by American law but a court later determined "Gideon Morgan and Margaret Morgan, alias Servier, were married according to the usages of the Cherokee tribe of Indians in that part of the territory of the Cherokees which was within the limits of the State of Tennessee, in 1813; that all that was necessary by their usages was a public agreement to live together as man and wife..." Their marriage was at issue in the 1844 Tennessee court case Morgan v. M'Ghee, which was a dispute over a debt that had been paid with enslaved human property.

== Creek War ==
Morgan had "earlier served as adjutant to Col. Samuel Wear (Weir; Ware) in the Tennessee Mounted Infantry." Gideon Morgan was married to John Walker's stepdaughter, Margaret Sevier, and was thus stepson-in-law. As one history of Cherokee participation in the Creek War has it, Indian agent Return J. Meigs "knew that Cherokees trusted Gideon Morgan, Walker's white son-in-law, he became the general in charge of the Cherokee regiment of approximately 600 men divided into seven companies. This included Cherokee countryman David McNair, a white married into a prominent Cherokee family and who led a special scout unit composed of seventeen mounted volunteers from the different companies." Morgan and two other White men, Richard Brown and John Lowrey, all of whom were married to Cherokee women, became colonels.

The University of Georgia Libraries hold a February 1814 letter from Morgan to Return J. Meigs reporting on troop movements.

"Copy of an old illustration of the Horseshoe Bend battlefield" (Nashville Banner, July 11, 1914)

Col. Morgan's Regiment of Cherokee Indians included notables like Sequoyah. John Coffee reported to his commanding general, Andrew Jackson, about the Battle of Horseshoe Bend that "Col. Gideon Morgan, commander of the Cherokees, Capt. Kerr, and Capt. William Russell were among the first" to cross the Tallapoosa River and attack the village of Tohopeka and he commended them for their action.

== Later life ==
In 1816 the relationship between Morgan and Meigs began to fray, when he complained that Return Meigs and his son Timothy Meigs were "mismanaging the Cherokee annuity and illegally using it to pay off the private debts owed to traders by individual Cherokees. Morgan said that Meigs had charged the annuity $10,000 for corn the previous year and that some Cherokee and white traders were making inordinate profits from this. He also said that Timothy Meigs purchased debts at a discount from traders and then would persuade his father to use the annuity to pay him for them in full." Pathkiller ordered Meigs to desist, but to no avail.

Under a treaty signed July 8, 1817, 300-some Cherokee were to be granted 640 acres outside of the Cherokee nation and with those land grants, United States citizenship. Morgan corresponded with Thomas McKenney and John C. Calhoun about the prices these reserves brought on the open market including one owned by his wife Margaret Morgan.

He was a signatory to the February 27, 1819 treaty between the U.S government and the Cherokee ("Calhoun treaty"). In 1820 he wrote to John C. Calhoun "regarding the lands he obtained in 1819 around the Citico Creek area of Tennessee. Morgan speaks of his living on the land and the various changes over the last year. Towards the end of the letter, he expresses an anxious solicitude to have Jackson's treaty brought to a final adjustment and concerns about the money owed him by the Cherokee Nation."

In 1827 several enslaved people legally owned by one of the Gideons Morgan, namely Amey, Cora Ann, Maria, and Sidney, joined Bethel Presbyterian Church in Roane County, Tennessee.

== See also ==
- Fort Southwest Point

== Sources ==
- Abram, Susan M. (2012). ""To Keep Bright the Bonds of Friendship" The Making of a Cherokee-American Alliance during the Creek War". Tennessee Historical Quarterly. 71 (3). Tennessee Historical Society: 228–257. ISSN 0040-3261. JSTOR 42628265.
- Ahern, L. R.; Hunt, R. F. (September 1955). "The Boatyard Store, 1814–1825". Tennessee Historical Quarterly. 14 (3). Tennessee Historical Society: 257–277. ISSN 0040-3261. JSTOR 42621241.
- Armstrong, Zella (1926). Notable Southern Families. Vol. IV. The Sevier Family. Chattanooga, Tennessee: Lookout Pub. Co.
- Berger, Bethany Ruth (1997). "After Pocahontas: Indian Women and the Law, 1830 to 1934". American Indian Law Review. 21 (1): 1–62. doi:10.2307/20068814. JSTOR 20068814. SSRN 2365378.
- Johnston, J. H. (January 1929). "Documentary Evidence of the Relations of Negroes and Indians". The Journal of Negro History. 14 (1): 21–43. doi:10.2307/2714096. ISSN 0022-2992. JSTOR 2714096.
- McLoughlin, William G. (Spring 1981). "Experiment in Cherokee Citizenship, 1817–1829". American Quarterly. 33 (1): 3–25. doi:10.2307/2712531. JSTOR 2712531.
- ——— (1986). Cherokee Renascence in the New Republic (ebook ed.). Princeton, N.J.: Princeton University Press. ISBN 978-0-691-04741-6. JSTOR j.ctv39x611. LCCN 86042843. OCLC 13859438. OL 2129522W. Project MUSE book 61052.
- Mellen, George F. (April 1921). "Calvin Morgan McClung and His Library". Tennessee Historical Magazine. 7 (1). Tennessee Historical Society: 3–26. ISSN 2333-9012. JSTOR 42637459.
- Ostby, Lloyd; Delaney, Mrs. Robert M. (1982). "Col. Gideon Morgan House — NHRP Inventory Nomination Form". NPS Gallery. Tennessee Historical Commission. United States National Park Service.
- Wells, Emma Helm Middleton (1927). The History of Roane County, Tennessee — Volume I: 1801–1870. Chattanooga, Tennessee: Lookout Publishing Company. LCCN 28003562. OCLC 2531250.
