= Overton Farm =

- U.S. National Register of Historic Places
- U.S. Historic district
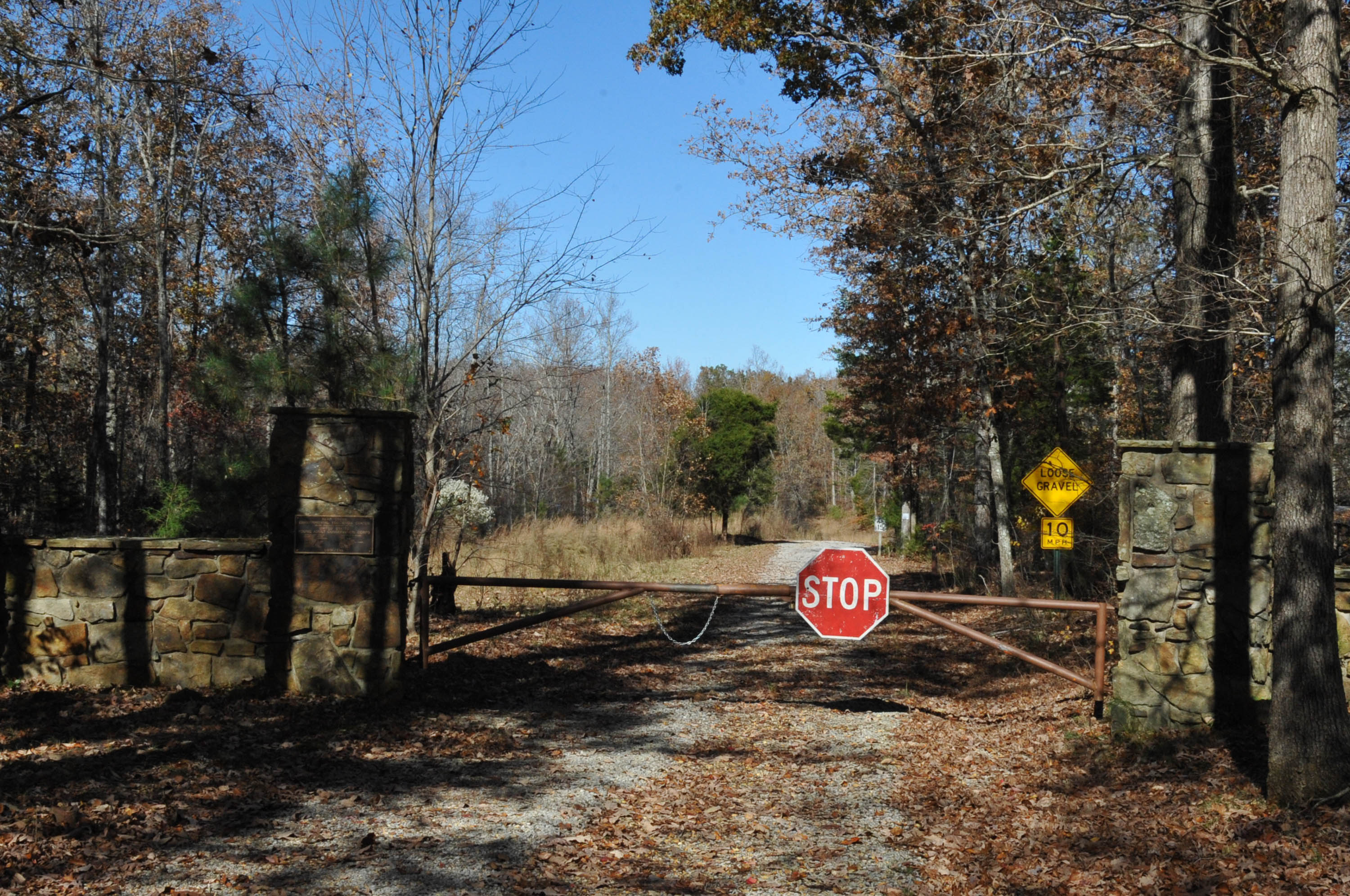

- Location within Alabama Location within the United States
- Nearest city: Hodges, Alabama
- Coordinates: 34°23′5″N 87°57′30″W
- Area: 8 acres (3.2 ha)
- Built: 1819
- Built by: Abner Overton
- Architectural style: Dogtrot, Log Cabin
- NRHP reference No.: 73000344
- Added to NRHP: October 3, 1973

Overton Farm is a historic farmhouse near Hodges, Alabama, United States. The farmstead was founded by Abner Overton, a traveling tobacco merchant from Raleigh, North Carolina. Overton purchased 160 acres (65 ha) in a bend of Bear Creek in 1817. Overton constructed a one-room log cabin in 1819, and gradually added to the house until it consisted of five rooms. Only two rooms of the house remain, separated by a dogtrot breezeway. The original west room originally had a stone chimney in the gable end, but it is no longer standing. The farm was operated by the Overton family until 1946 and was purchased by the Tennessee Valley Authority in 1969 as part of the land affected by the construction of Bear Creek Dam. The farm was restored by the Northwest Alabama State Junior College in the 1970s and used as an educational center until 2013. The house was listed on the National Register of Historic Places in 1973.
