= Jackson's Military Road =

19th-century Mississippi trail

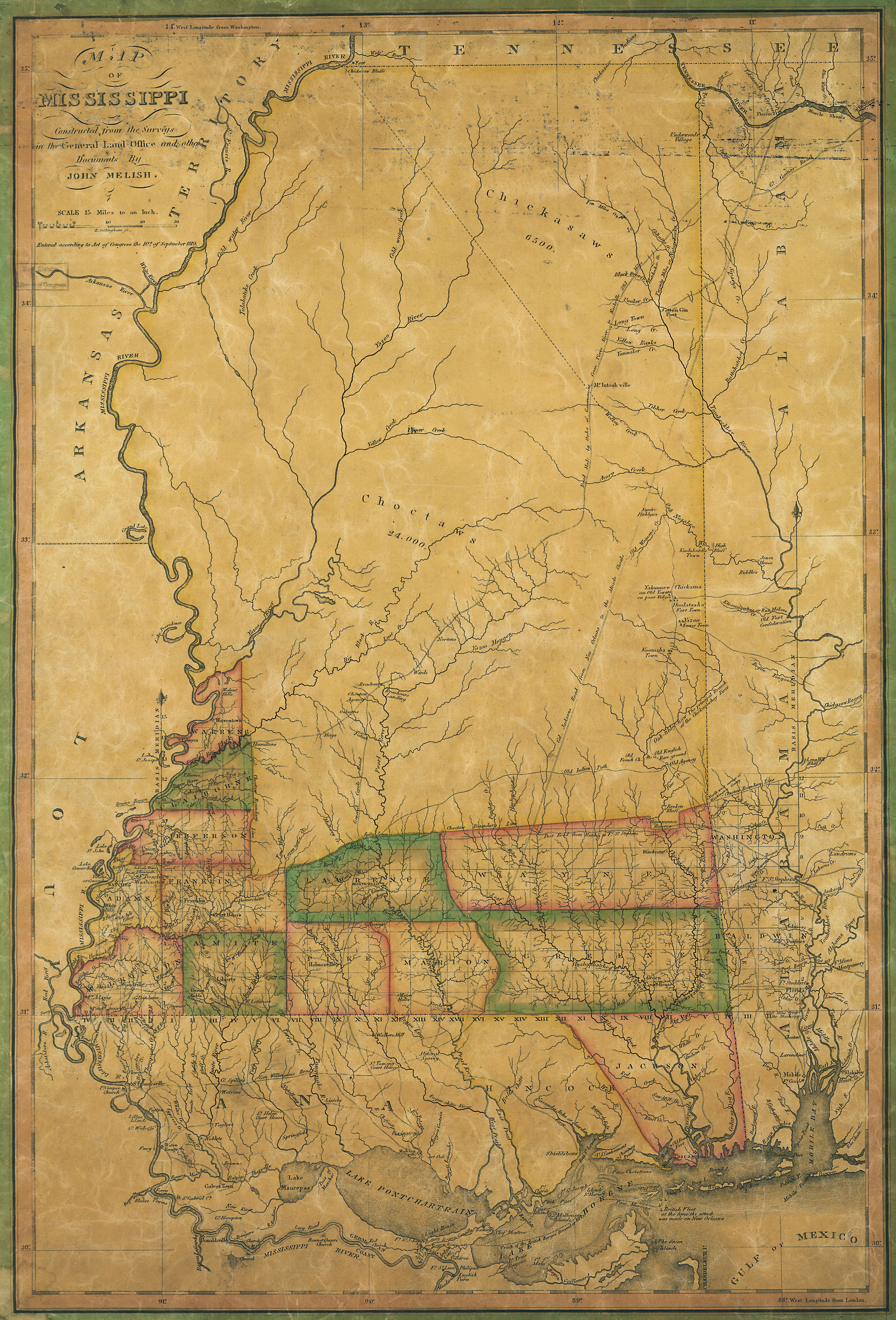
"Gen. Jackson's Road" on the 1819 map by John Melish

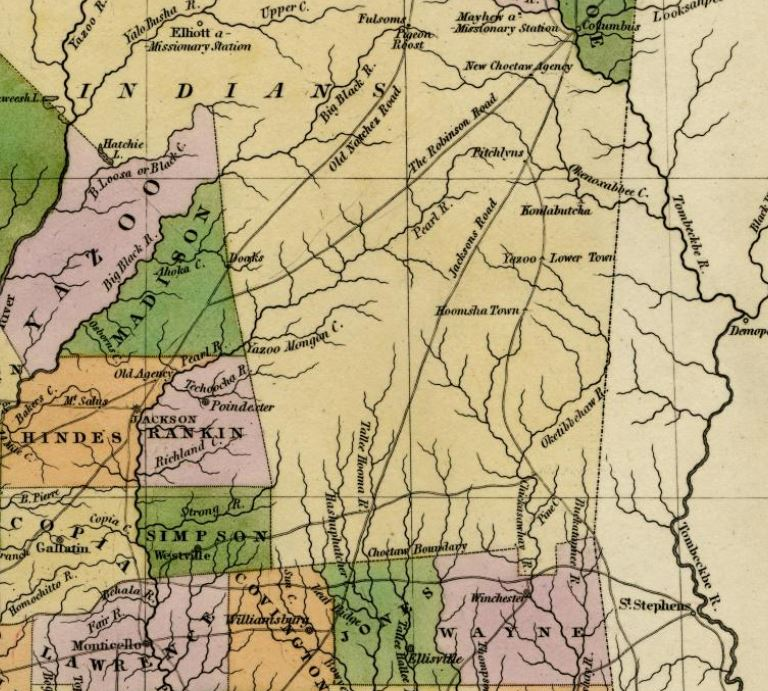
1828 map showing Jackson's Military Road segment in central Mississippi (labelled as "Jackson's Road")

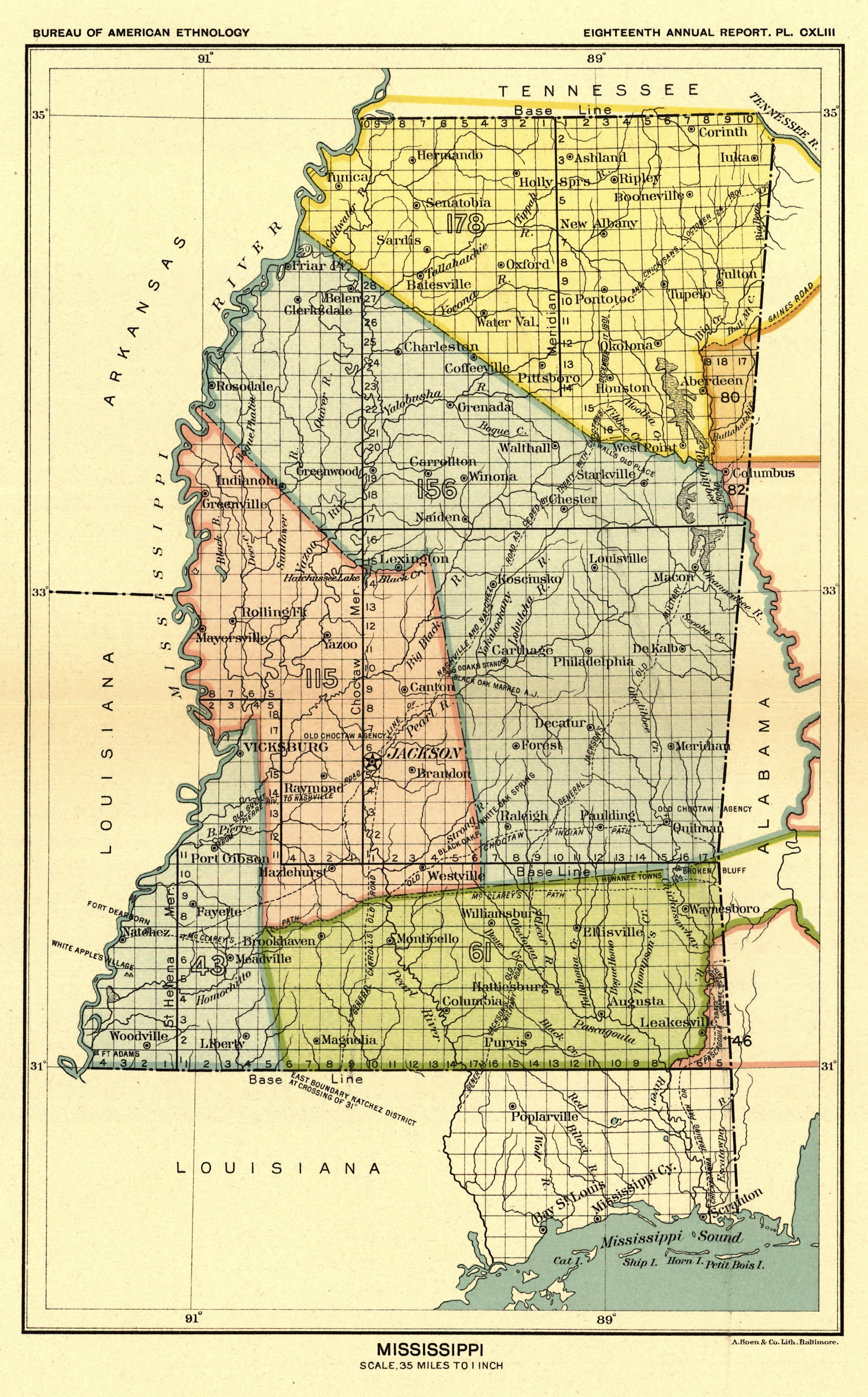
"General Jackson's Old Military Road" on the Indian Land Cessions map of Mississippi, 1898

Jackson's Military Road was a 19th-century route connecting Nashville, Tennessee, with New Orleans, Louisiana. After the War of 1812, Congress appropriated funds in 1816 to build and improve this road. It was completed in 1820. The road was named for then General Andrew Jackson, hero of the United States victory at the Battle of New Orleans against British forces.

== Construction ==
The appropriation for Jackson's Military Road was made on April 24, 1816:

Be it enacted by the Senate and House of Representatives of the United States of America, in Congress assembled, That the sum of ten thousand dollars be and are hereby appropriated, and payable out of any moneys in the treasury not otherwise appropriated for the purpose of repairing and keeping in repair the road between Columbia on Duck River in the state of Tennessee, and Madisonville in the state of Louisiana, by the Choctaw Agency, and also the road between Fort Hawkins, in the state of Georgia, and Fort Stoddard, under the direction of the Secretary of War.

On September 24, 1816, William H. Crawford, Secretary of War, informed General Andrew Jackson, then commanding the Army district at Nashville, of the appropriation, and directing that $5,000 be spent on the road to Louisiana. He noted that "I have received no information of the length of this road, the nature of the country through which it passes, or its present state. If there are many bridges to be erected the appropriation will be inadequate to the object. In that event the employment of a part of the troops may become necessary."

Jackson was officially in charge of the entire construction, including the First and Eighth Infantry and the artillery detachment who supplied the labor. However, his subordinates directly supervised much of the construction. Captain H. Young surveyed the route, completing this task by June 1817. They found that bridges were needed, and Congress appropriated an additional $5,000 in March 1818. Major Perrin Willis took command of the construction gang, then numbering about fifty, in April 1819, when the road reached the Pearl River. The road was completed in May 1820, after 75,801 man-days of labor.

== Description ==
The Tuscumbian of Tuscumbia, Alabama, printed a description of "General Jackson's Military Road" on November 12, 1824. It states its length at 436 miles (Nashville to Madisonville) or 516 miles (Nashville to New Orleans), 200 miles (320 km) shorter than the historic Natchez Trace. The article describes the construction gang as averaging 300, "including sawyers, carpenters, blacksmiths, etc." The road included 35 bridges and 20,000 feet (6,100 m) of causeway, particularly through the swamps of Noxubee County, Mississippi.

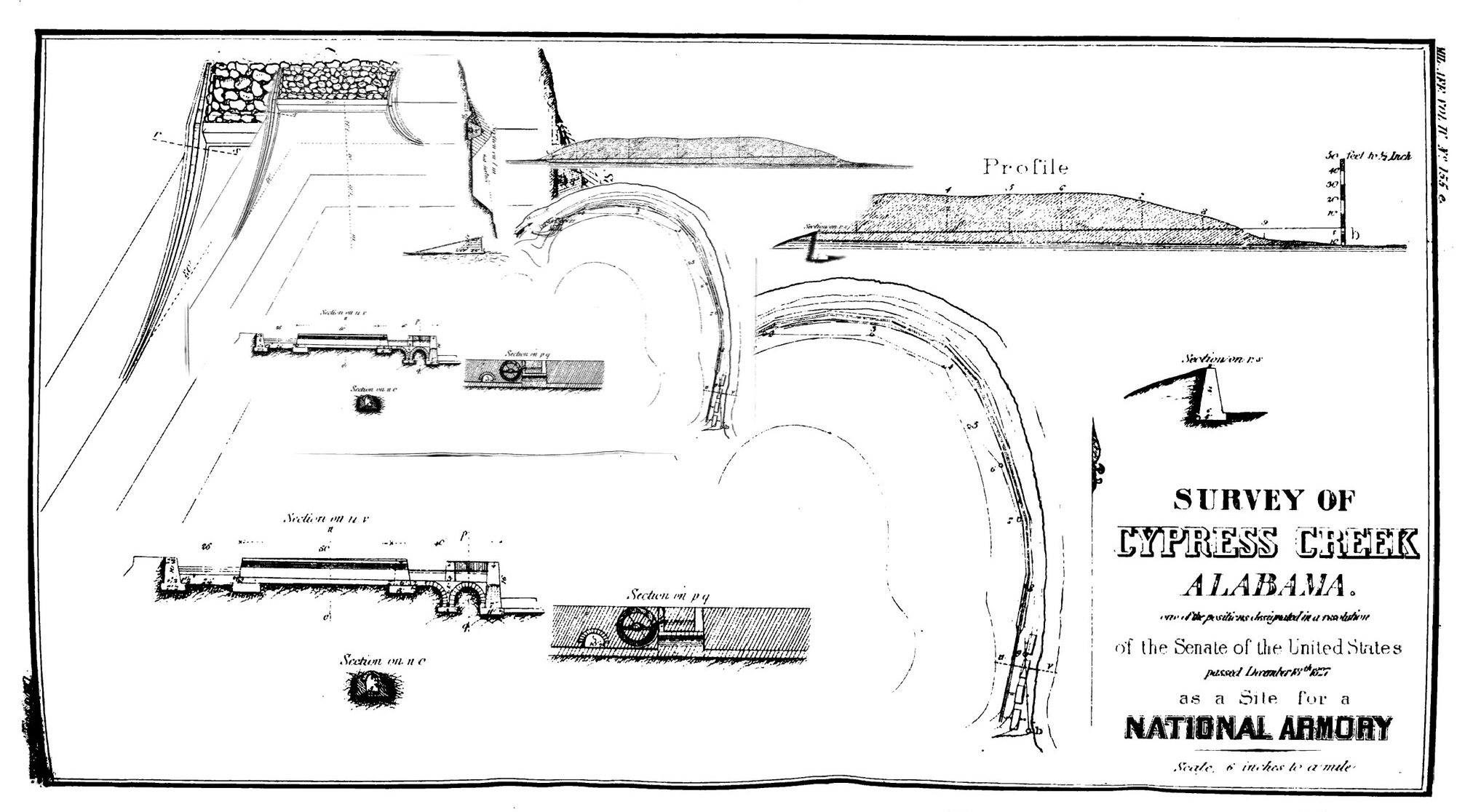
Survey of Cypress Creek (Alabama) as a site for a national armory (circa 1816–1828)

From Columbia, Tennessee, the Military Road passed through Lawrenceburg and crossed the Tennessee River at Florence, Alabama. Jackson and his friends at the Cypress Land Company hoped to have a United States Armory, including an arsenal, cannon foundry, and supply depot, built along the road at Florence at the foot of the Muscle Shoals. He proposed sites at Cypress Creek and Shoals Creek in Lauderdale County, and these were surveyed by the United States in 1817, 1823, and 1828. Jackson thought a 30,000-acre (12,000 ha) tract would suffice for the armory. However, the armory for the southern states never came to pass and nothing was built at either site.

Byler Road branched off of the Military Road in Lauderdale County, Alabama. The road then intersected the Gaines Trace at Russellville, Alabama (where it still exists as Jackson Avenue). It cut cross-country through what was the territory of the Choctaw Nation, in what later developed as the states of Alabama and Mississippi.

In Hamilton, Alabama, "Military Street" marks the route of the Military Road. The road crossed the Tombigbee River in Columbus, Mississippi; the route still exists in that town and still bears the name "Military Road" from the Alabama border to downtown. West of the Tombigbee, the road passed through lands later assigned to Lowndes, Noxubee, Kemper, Newton, Jasper, Jones, Marion, and Pearl River counties, before crossing into Louisiana at the Pearl River twenty miles (32 km) west of today's Poplarville, Mississippi. The road continued directly from the future site of Bogalusa, Louisiana, to Madisonville, Louisiana, on the north shore of Lake Pontchartrain.

Jackson's Military Road declined in importance in the 1840s due to disrepair and the difficulty of keeping it passable through the swamps of the Noxubee River. It was largely replaced by the Robinson Road. (Available information about Robinson Road is scant, but it apparently linked Columbus, Mississippi, and Jackson, the city which was designated in the early 1820s as Mississippi's capital.)

The route later became part of the Jackson Highway.

== See also ==
- General Carroll's Road
- Andrew Jackson and land speculation

== Sources ==
- Rice, Turner (1975a). "Andrew Jackson and His Northwest Alabama Interests". Journal of Muscle Shoals History. 3. University of North Alabama. Florence, Alabama: Tennessee Valley Historical Society: 3–12. ISSN 0094-8039. LCCN 74646773. OCLC 1795446.
