= Gaines Trace =

Former road in the Mississippi Territory

Coordinates: 34.666340°N 87.301353°W

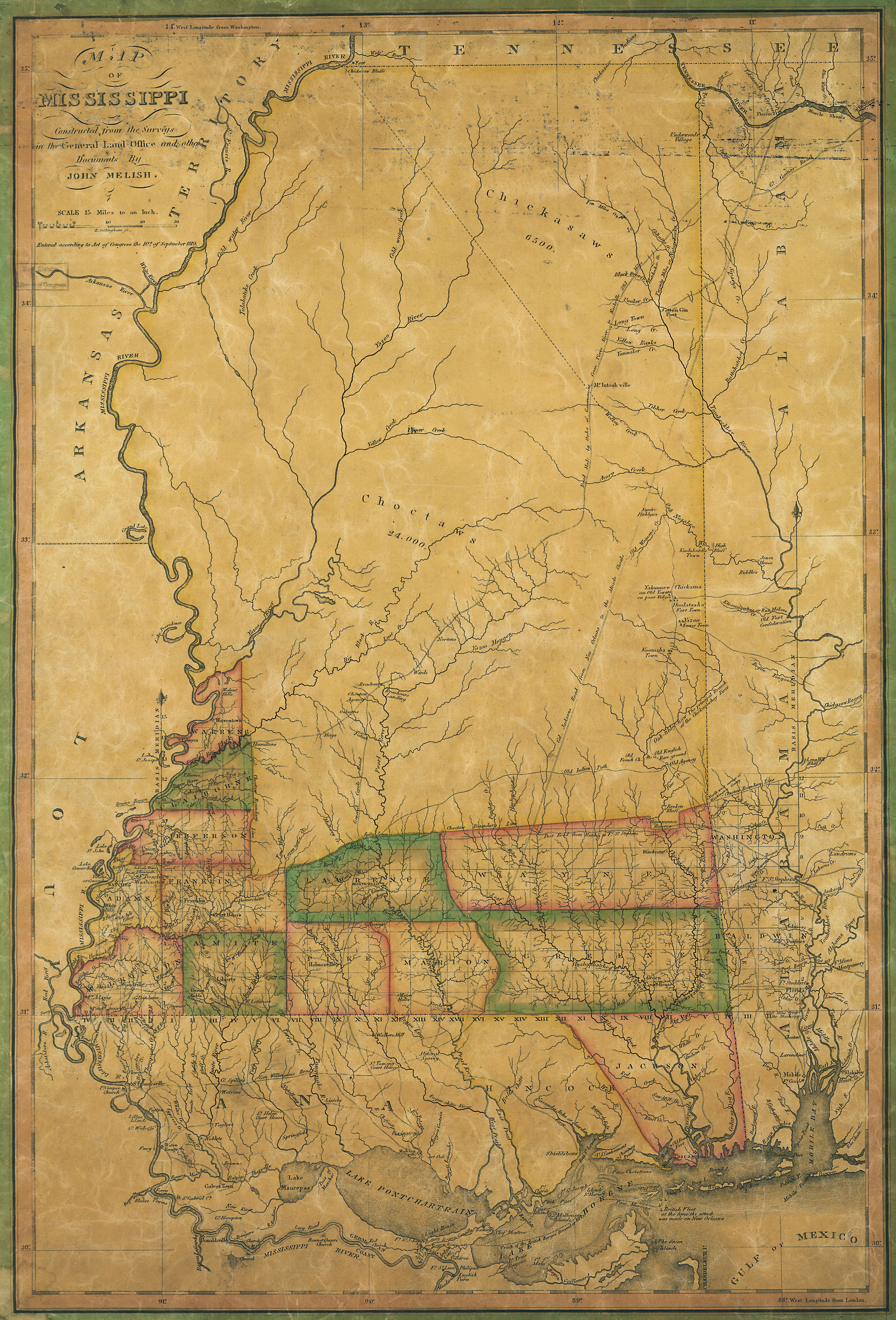
"Gaines Road" on the 1819 map by John Melish

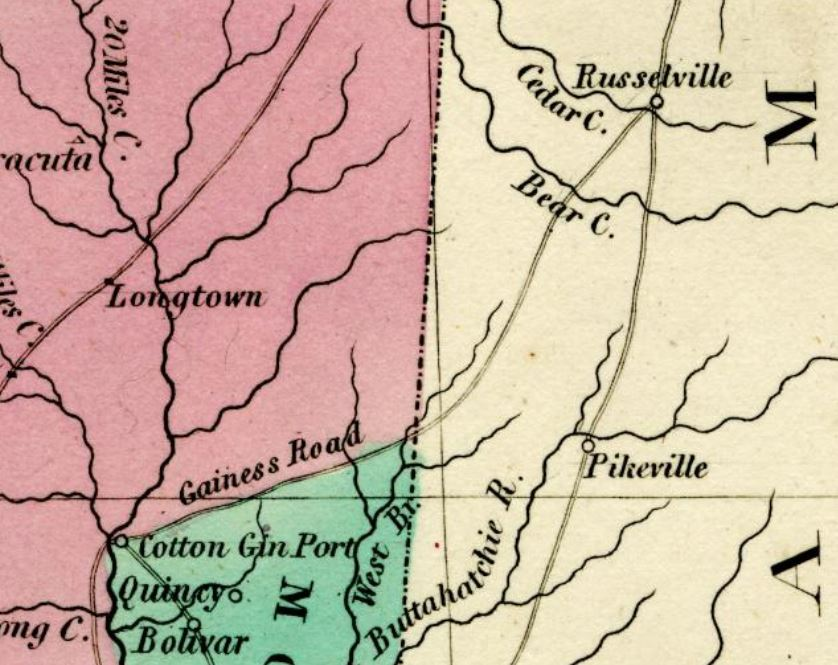
1831 map showing Gaines Trace (labelled as "Gaines Road")

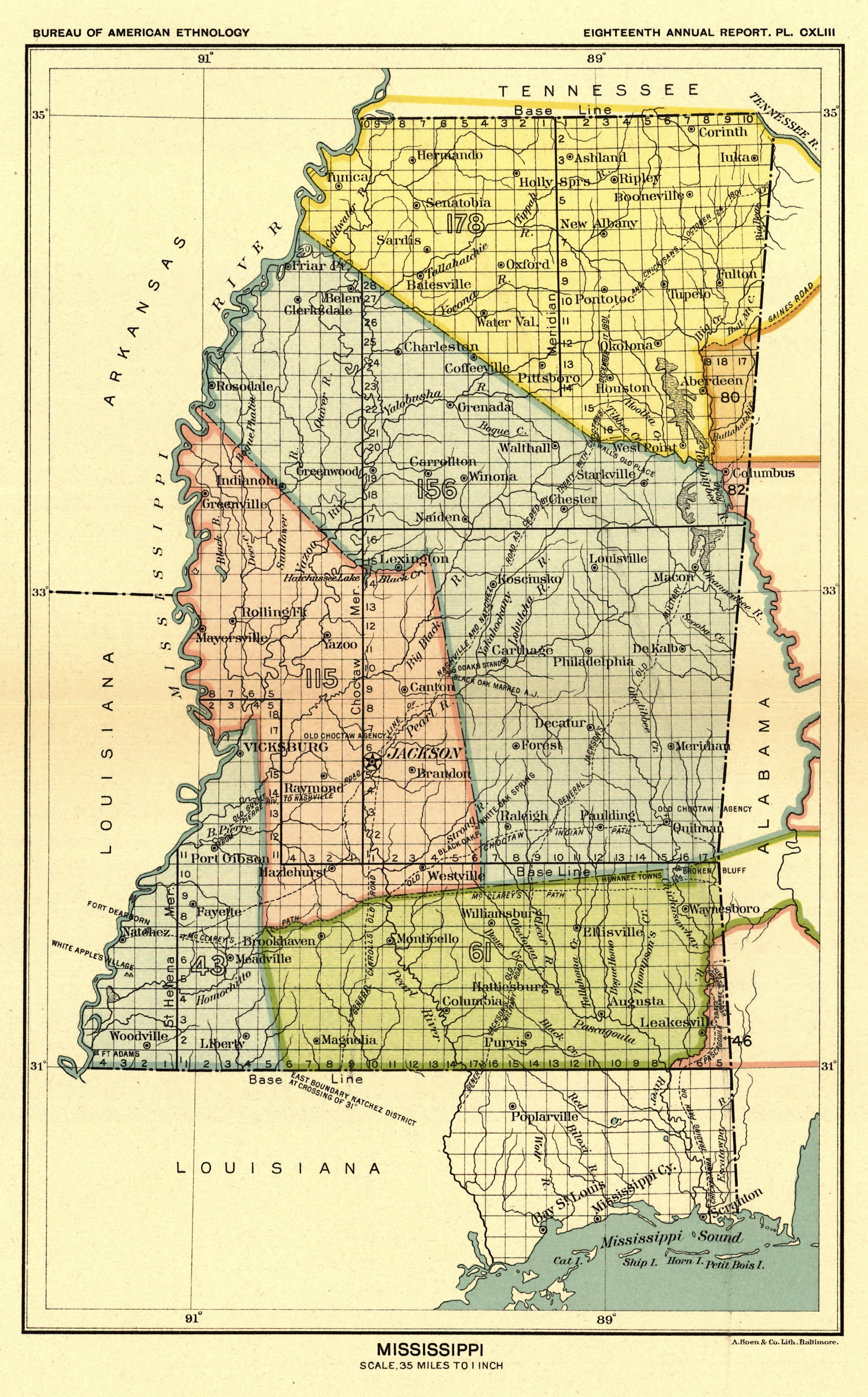
"Gaines Road" on the Indian Land Cessions map of Mississippi, 1898

The Gaines Trace was a road in the Mississippi Territory. It was constructed in 1811 and 1812 from the Tennessee River (opposite the Elk River's mouth) to Cotton Gin Port on the upper Tombigbee River and on to Fort Stoddert on the lower Tombigbee. The portion from the Tennessee River to Cotton Gin Port was surveyed in 1807 and 1808 by Edmund P. Gaines, the road's namesake and a career U.S. Army officer.

In 1816, the Gaines Trace and the Tombigbee River were the boundaries between United States and Chickasaw territory in Mississippi.

A portion of the road appeared on an 1831 map of Mississippi that illustrated the "Gaines Road" extending from Russellville, Alabama to Cotton Gin Port.

Jackson's Military Road, constructed from 1816 to 1820, intersected Gaines Trace in Russellville. Tennessee Street in Courtland, Alabama, was a portion of the Trace.
