= Treaty of Turkeytown =

Treaty with the Cherokee

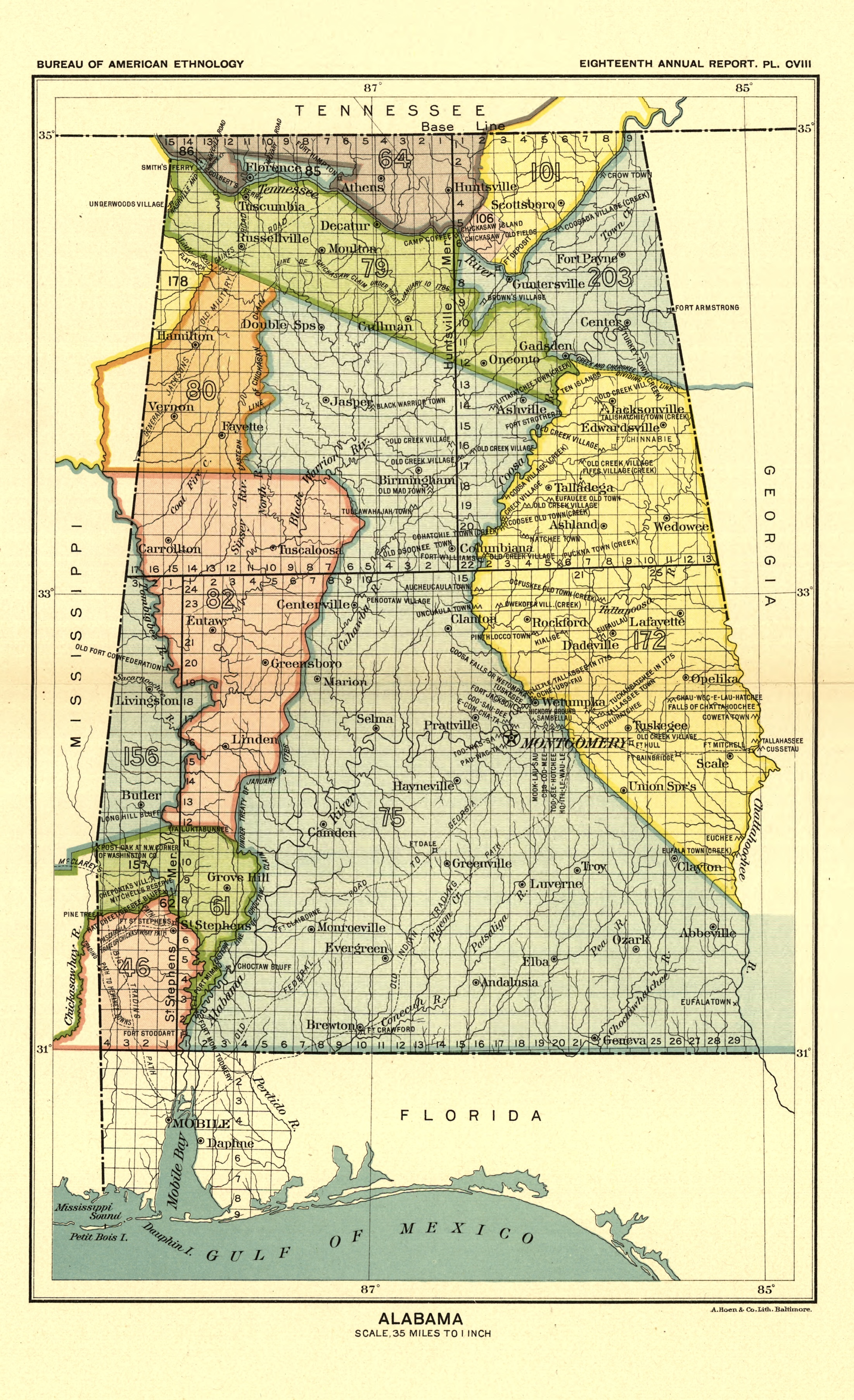
Land ceded shown in green, cession 80

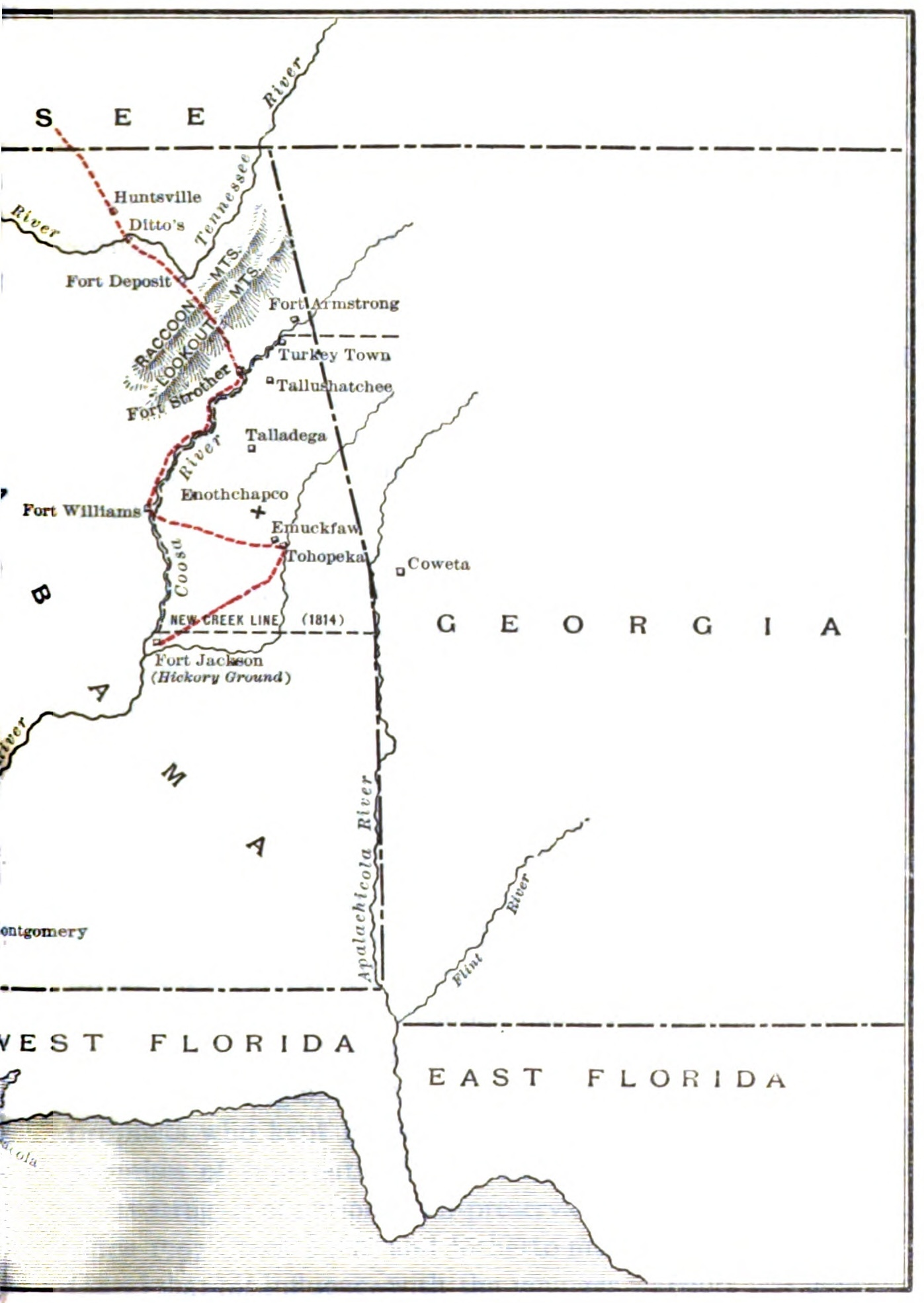
Creek War map from The life of Andrew Jackson, by John Spencer Bassett (1916), showing location of Turkey Town on the Coosa River

The Treaty of Turkeytown, also known as the Treaty with the Cherokee and the Treaty of Chickasaw Council House (Cherokee) was negotiated on 14 September 1816, between delegates of the former Cherokee Nation on the one part and Major General Andrew Jackson, General David Meriwether and Jesse Franklin, Esq., who served as agents of the United States in the capacity of "commissioners plenipotentiary", on the other part. Conducted following the Creek War, the initial meeting was held at the Chickasaw Council House and stipulated a further meeting on 28 September 1816, to be conducted at "Turkey's Town", on the Coosa River, near the present day town of Centre, in Cherokee County, Alabama. The treaty was ratified by the Cherokee Nation at Turkeytown on 4 October 1816, and signed by Pathkiller, then Principal Chief of the Cherokee Nation.

The Treaty of Turkeytown ceded Cherokee lands in northwestern Alabama south of the Tennessee River and west of the Coosa River, 3500 square miles of land (2.24 million acres) to the United States and provided for a one-time payment of $5,000 to the Cherokee to recompense for improvements that had made on the land; as well as an annuity of $6,000 per year for a term of ten years. Per the editors of The Papers of Andrew Jackson $5,000 in improvement money related to land at Melton's Bluff that Jackson and his business partner John Hutchings would purchase two months later, and noted "Tochelar, Oohulookee, Wososey, and the two interpreters (Thomas Wilson and Alexander McCoy) each received $100; the other Cherokee delegates, $50 each. The annuity was for ten years only".

== See also ==
- Cherokee treaties
- U.S.-Native American treaties
- Treaty of Hopewell (Cherokee)
