= Indian Affairs: Laws and Treaties =

U.S. government documents series (1902–1971)

Indian Affairs: Laws and Treaties is a seven-volume serial edited by Charles J. Kappler and published by the United States Congress in 1902, 1904, 1913, 1927, 1970, and 1971. The seven volumes and have been digitized and indexed by Oklahoma State University Libraries. Volume II contains the text of all U.S.– Native American treaties. Volumes I and III–VII reprint all "U.S. laws and executive orders concerning Native Americans from 1871–1970...Enhanced by the editors' use of margin notations and a comprehensive index, the information contained in Indian Affairs: Laws and Treaties is in high demand by Native peoples, researchers, journalists, attorneys, legislators, teachers and others."

Kappler (1868–1946) was a staffer for the U.S. Senate Committee on Indian Affairs. He also "played a substantial part in many significant federal Indian law cases before the United States Supreme Court in the years leading up to the establishment of the Indian Claims Commission."

== See also ==
- Indian Land Cessions in the United States
- Aboriginal title in the United States
- Tribal sovereignty in the United States
