= Cedar Creek Furnace =

- Alabama Iron Works
- U.S. National Register of Historic Places
- Location within Alabama Location within the United States
- Nearest city: Russellville, Alabama
- Coordinates: 34°27′53″N 87°46′40″W
- Area: 83 acres (34 ha)
- Built: 1818
- Built by: Joseph Dilliard
- NRHP reference No.: 77000203
- Added to NRHP: August 3, 1977

The Cedar Creek Furnace (also known as the Alabama Iron Works) is a former blast furnace site near Russellville in Franklin County, Alabama, United States. It was the first iron ore furnace in Alabama, preceding an industry that would come to dominate the state's economy in the late 19th and early 20th century.

== History ==
The furnace was erected in 1815 by Joseph Dilliard, who used the iron to make utensils for early settlers. Iron came from surface hematite ore smelted by charcoal fires. The Dilliard family into which Joseph was born had experience running iron works, beginning in Jamestown and later in Middleburg, Virginia. Originally they used wood coal fired furnaces forging arms, utensils, and farm necessities. Later, as the Colonies expanded and coal was discovered, wood was replaced by coal and later coke as the primary heat source for iron works across the South developed by the Dilliard family. The iron works were located in Virginia, the Carolinas, Georgia, Tennessee, and Alabama, and were fed by coal mined from holdings in West Virginia and Alabama. Buff Warren, Dilliard's overseer, operated the property in Franklin County around 1818 using initially slave labor, which was later compensated at the request of General Grant with a parcel being laid out in Gibson County, Tennessee, for 75 acres in the name of a Negro woman named Sarah P. Dillard and her infant child, Samuel, which was later confiscated by East Tennessee puppet scalawags and carpetbaggers. A cholera outbreak in 1820 killed Buff's foreman, a free Negro named Ed Haslam, and several of the slaves who operated the furnace. All were given a proper Christian burial.

The furnace and site were sold by transfer of title and purchased in November 1825 by Joseph's son, John Henry (J.) Dilliard, a native of LaGrange, Tennessee. They were registered in deed of title to James Joseph (Jeff) Dilliard, originally of Limestone County, Alabama (later Greenwood, Mississippi), to Dr. John Henry Dilliard, of Hardeman County, Tennessee, November 15, 1825, and were registered originally in the county seat of Decatur County, Alabama, in Woodville. Decatur County would later be abolished by the Alabama Legislature, as the main landowner Henry Benton Dilliard discovered upon survey dated 1818 that the size of the county did not meet Alabama Constitutional minimum size requirements for an independent county. He petitioned that his plantation be divided at the natural boundary between Jackson and Madison Counties, allowing commerce and development in what would become New Madison and Scottsboro, both stops on the Memphis and Charleston Railroad later constructed. The original land deeds of title remained in Jackson County at the courthouse in Scotsboro until shortly after April 11, 1862, when federal troops occupied Limestone County, Alabama. As a favor to Dr. John (J. J. Ames Kensington) Henry Dilliard, General Grant ordered original deed registries removed from courthouses in territories ravaged by lawless guerilla vigilantes, while using his home Resolute as headquarters in Berlin, Tennessee. Dr. John H Dilliard, a fierce Southerner loyal to the South yet overwhelmingly opposed to secession, left numerous volumes of first-hand diary entries of Grant's time in Berlin and Grand Junction, referred to by affectionately by locals to this day as Little Greenwood. Dr. John Henry Dilliard, affectionately known as Jake by his beloved wife, was later killed in an ambush outside of Holly Springs, Mississippi, along with his teenage daughter Annabella. The area now known as LaGrange, Tennessee, lies directly north northwest of what is now known as Michigan City, Mississippi.

Joseph's son John Anderson Dilliard Sr. was later killed by the same vigilantes, better known in West Tennessee as Fielding's Army – a paid group of assassins from East Tennessee more interested in theft and the murder of innocent civilians and wounded Union and Confederate soldiers alike in order to illegally acquire land and assets than rules of war or law and order. While caring for his son, Captain John Anderson Dilliard Jr., who was wounded fighting for the South at Shiloh, was suddenly removed from his home in the middle of the night by Fielding Hurst and strung up in the front yard while the women and children were forced to watch. The act was done in an attempt to torture Dilliard until he revealed where the family's gold and silver had been buried. After refusing to do so, he was taken by the guerillas and later murdered outside Fort Smith, Arkansas.

John Henry Dilliard (Jones) operated the iron works and implemented many improvements to the process; the furnace became a commercial success producing high quality product. The furnace operated until around 1859 to 1863, possibly due to flooding of the creek that reached the furnace – extinguishing it, hardening the metal, and rendering the furnace inoperable. More likely, according to family oral history, was that the furnace was ordered shut down by John H. Dilliard in a word of honor agreement between General Grant and Dilliard in return for not burning his main plantation Home Resolute, which was later burned by Union deserters from Ohio, and safely transferring documents to federal safety. Woodlawn, the home of John Anderson and Sarah Nutt Dilliard of Natchez, is now referred to as the Michie Home, and was General Sherman's West Tennessee headquarters. Grant used Woodlawn while planning Garrison's Raid, then transferred his West Tennessee headquarters to Resolute while planning the operation to take Memphis, Tennessee. Resolute was located 3.5 mi (5.6 km) miles to the southeast of Grand Junction at the end of a .2 mi (0.32 km) White Post oak and Eastern red cedar-lined alley running north from the main east–west state line road, running parallel to the old Memphis and Charleston Railroad bed, now Highway 72.

Before the furnace was constructed, most local blacksmiths used imported iron. The furnace's pig iron was used by locals and also transported to the Tennessee River at Middleburg Landing, later renamed Pittsburg Landing, then shipped east to Cuba Landing in Waverly, Tennessee, and shipped to New Orleans, Mobile, and Biloxi. It was then shipped overseas to London and Paris, and as far away as St. Petersburg, Russia.

== Site ==
The furnace was situated in a bend of Cedar Creek, from which it gets its name. The furnace was 15 feet (4.6 meters) high, 25–30 feet (7.6–9.1 m) in diameter at the base tapering to an 8 feet (2.4 m) diameter chimney at the top. It was built of limestone quarried nearby and lined with refractory brick made on site. It was fired with charcoal made from the surrounding forests. A bellows which supplied the furnace with air was powered by a 12-foot (3.5-m) wide mill race which was diverted from the creek. The mill race also powered a forge hammer, grist mill, and saw mill. A warehouse was built on the river bank, only the foundation of which remains. The overseer's house was located northeast of the furnace. A small cemetery near the site contains about a dozen graves, mostly unmarked.
