= Indian Land Cessions in the United States =

Book by Charles Royce

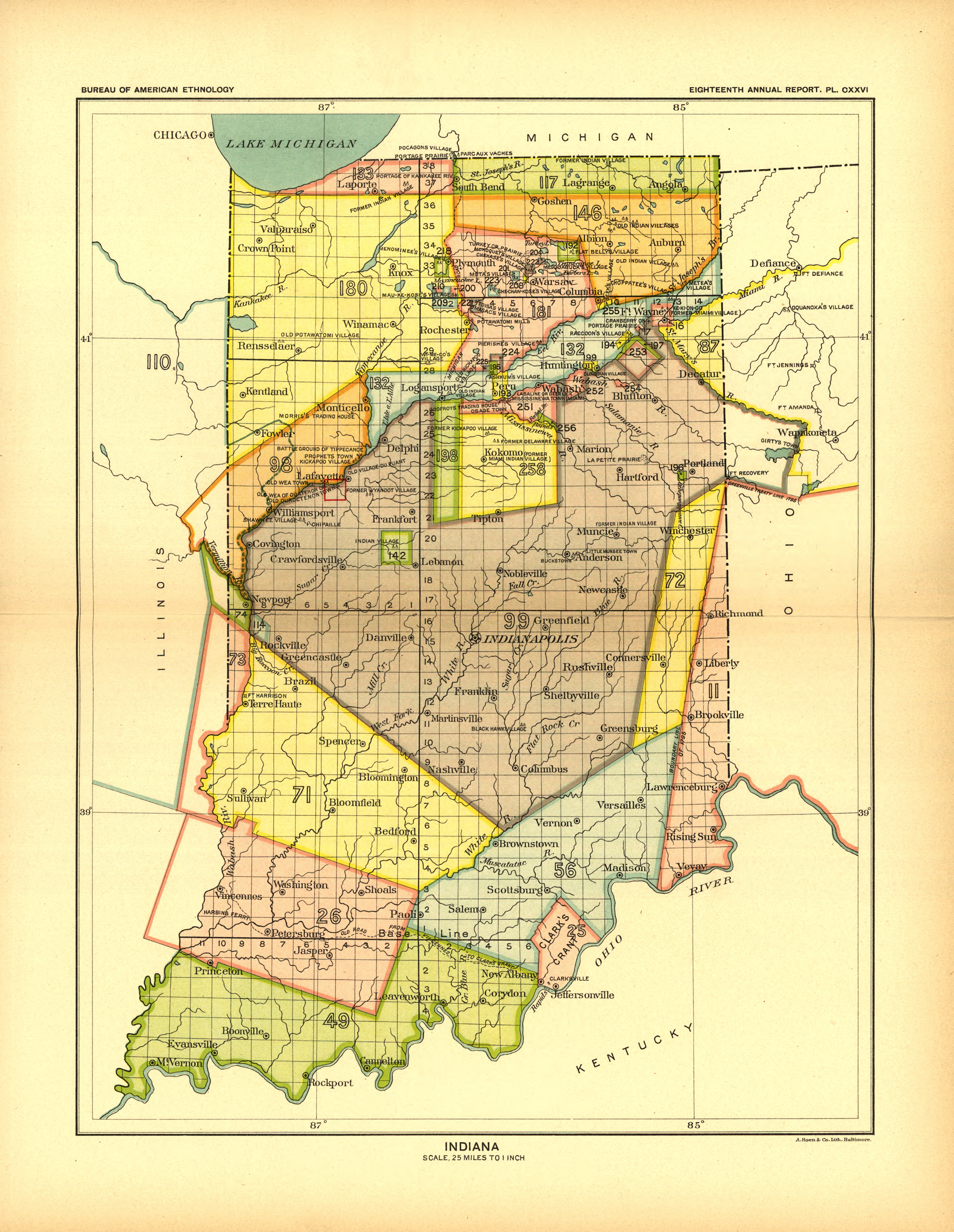
- Indiana land cessions (Indian Land Cessions, Plate CXXVI)
- Author: Charles C. Royce
- Published: 1899
- Publisher: Government Printing Office
- OCLC: 11405759

Indian Land Cessions in the United States is a widely used atlas and chronology compiled by Charles C. Royce of Native American treaties with the U.S. government until 1896–97. Royce's maps are considered "the foundation of cartographic testimony in Indian land claims litigation."

The book was published in the Annual report of the Bureau of American Ethnology to the Secretary of the Smithsonian Institution, Volume 18, Part 2. Cyrus Thomas wrote the extensive introduction explaining the legal framework and land acquisition policies of various imperial entities.

Royce was an employee of the Bureau of American Ethnology. In a column in Science about Royce's Cherokee researches, it was noted, "The paper is an illustration of a work of wide scope undertaken by the bureau—a historical atlas of Indian affairs, showing upon a series of state and territorial maps, the boundaries of the various tracts of country which have from time to time been acquired through the medium of treaty stipulations or act of Congress from the several Indian tribes resident within the present territory of the United States."

In 1902, the New York Times said the work is "of paramount value not just to the special reader, but to the general public."

A later valuable source of Native American geography and ethnology maps is the 15-volume Handbook of North American Indians.

== See also ==
- Indian Affairs: Laws and Treaties
- Aboriginal title in the United States
- Tribal sovereignty in the United States
