= John Melish =

Scottish mapmaker (1771–1822)

- Born: June 13, 1771; Scotland
- Died: December 30, 1822 (aged 51); Philadelphia, Pennsylvania
- Occupation(s): Geographer, cartographer
- Known for: First coast-to-coast map of the United States

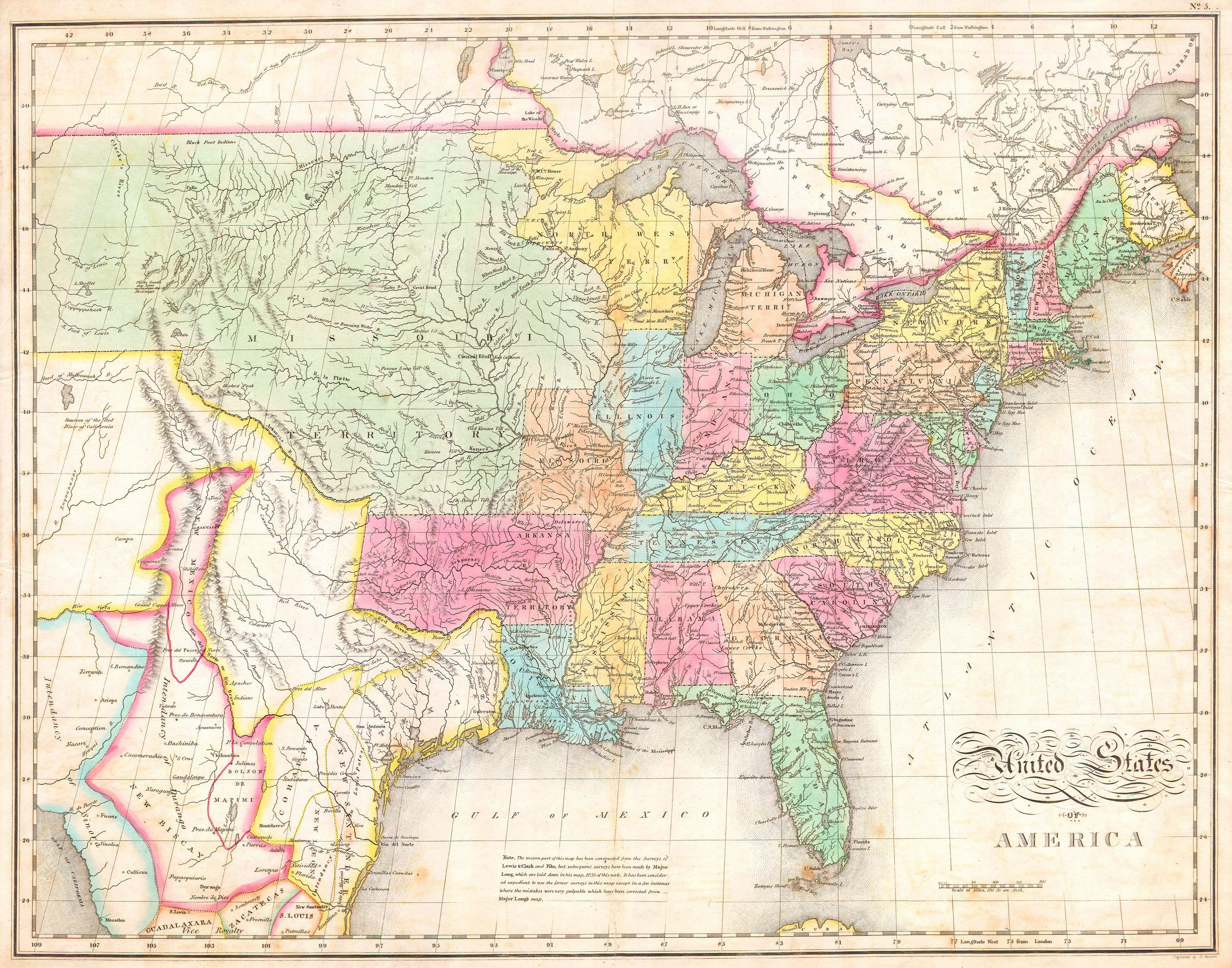
1823 Melish map of the United States and portions of Mexico from the Atlantic Ocean to the area west of the Rocky Mountains.

John Melish (June 13, 1771 – December 30, 1822) was a Scottish mapmaker who published some of the earliest maps of the United States (US). In 1816, he created the first map of the United States extending to the Pacific Ocean.

== Early life ==
Melish was born in Scotland on June 13, 1771. He worked under the tutelage of a cotton merchant in Glasgow and later tried to form his own cotton import-export company. Between 1806 and 1811, Melish made several trips to the United States, finally settling in Philadelphia in 1811. A year later, he published Travels through the United States of America, in the years 1806 & 1807, and 1809, 1810, & 1811 documenting his voyages to the US with copious maps.

== Philadelphia ==
Melish started his own map publishing company in Philadelphia. It was the first of its kind in the United States. His maps were inspired by his travels and fulfilled a contemporary need for accurate cartography. US President Thomas Jefferson took note of Melish's maps, sending copies to associates in Europe. In 1816, Melish published an important map, Map of the United States with the contiguous British and Spanish Possessions, which depicted the United States from the Atlantic Ocean to the Pacific Ocean, thus implicitly staking a larger claim for the US than existed at that time.

Melish's books detailing the state of American manufacturing influenced Jefferson to adopt a point of view favoring manufacturing in the US, as opposed to shipping raw good to Europe for manufacturing into finished products.

== Bibliography ==
- Travels through the United States of America, in the years 1806 & 1807, and 1809, 1810, & 1811, 1812
- The Sine Qua Non: a Map of the United States, Shewing the Boundary Line Proposed by the British Commissioners at Ghent, G. Palmer, printer, 1814

== See also ==
- Cartographer Henry Schenck Tanner, a contemporary of John Melish
