= John Rhea =

American politician (1753–1832)

John Angus Rhea
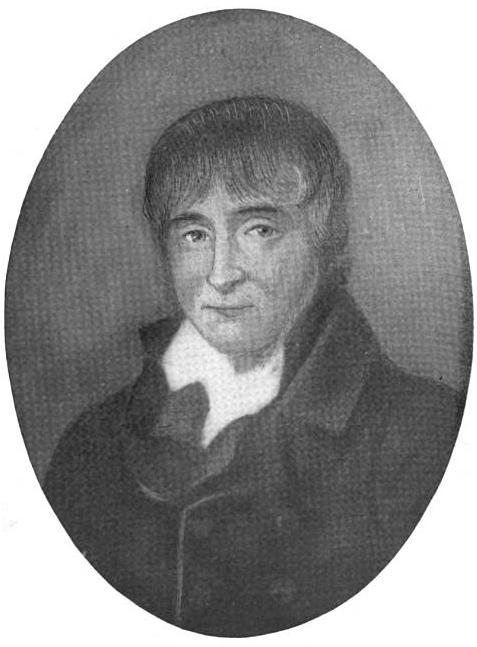
- John Rhea
- Born: c. 1753; County Londonderry, Kingdom of Ireland
- Died: May 27, 1832 (aged 78–79); Blountville, Tennessee, U.S.
- Known for: United States Congress; Rhea County, Tennessee; Rhea letter

John Rhea (pronounced ray /reɪ/) (c. 1753 – May 27, 1832) was an American soldier and politician of the early 19th century who represented Tennessee in the United States House of Representatives. Rhea County, Tennessee and Rheatown, Tennessee are named for him.

== Early years ==
Rhea was born in the parish of Langhorn, County Londonderry in the Kingdom of Ireland. His family immigrated to Pennsylvania when he was 16, settling in Philadelphia. His father, Rev. Joseph Rhea, a Presbyterian minister, moved the family to Piney Creek, Maryland in 1771. They moved again in 1778 to what is now eastern Tennessee (then in North Carolina).

== Career ==
He served in the Patriot militia that defeated a loyalist force at the Battle of Kings Mountain in October 1780; he reportedly also served as Ensign in the Fifth Virginia Regiment of Continentals at the Battle of Brandywine.

Rhea became clerk of the Sullivan County Court in the proposed State of Franklin, and subsequently in North Carolina, from 1785 to 1790. He was a member of the North Carolina House of Commons, and served as a delegate from Sullivan County to the Fayetteville Convention that ratified the Federal Constitution in 1789. He then studied law and was admitted to bar in 1789. In 1796, he was a delegate to the constitutional convention of Tennessee and also the attorney general of Greene County. At the same time he was a member of the Tennessee House of Representatives for two years.

According to the editors of volume one of The Papers of Andrew Jackson, "Jackson was responsible through congressional patronage" for the appointment of his brother-in-law Robert Hays to the position of U.S. Marshal for Tennessee in 1797. Jackson also wrote in a letter to Hays "...but who will be Judge [for the same judicial district] I know not but I expect Rhea." The judicial appointment went not to Rhea but to John McNairy. In 1805 Rhea paid taxes on 1750 acres in Roane County, Tennessee.

Rhea was elected as a Democratic-Republican to the Eighth Congress and the five succeeding Congresses, serving from March 4, 1803, until March 3, 1815. During the Tenth through the Thirteenth Congress, he was the chairman of the Committee on Post Office and Post Roads. He was a member of the Committee on Pensions and Revolutionary War Claims during the Fifteenth Congress through the Seventeenth Congress.

In spring 1815, at Houston's request, he petitioned James Monroe to grant Sam Houston an officer's commission in the regular army.

He was appointed United States commissioner to treat with the Choctaw Nation in 1816, and wrote James Madison with a report from the treaty ground. He was a witness to the September 1816 Treaty with the Chickasaw that was negotiated by Andrew Jackson, David Meriwether, and Jesse Franklin.

According to biographer Marguerite B. Hamer, "Rhea favored the extinguishment of the Indian title in deference to the superior race. In 1822 he declared the ousting of the Indian to be in keeping with 'sound policy and economy.' He maintained that 'the Cherokee claim for land in Georgia and in Tennessee ought to be done away.'" In keeping with his Jacksonian allegiances, he also defended slavery and the right of slave owners to hunt fugitives across state lines, voted against internal improvements, and supported a measure precluding everyone who was not an avowed Christian from testifying in court cases.

Afterward, he again became a U.S. Representative, serving from March 4, 1817, until March 3, 1823, in the Fifteenth, Sixteenth, and Seventeenth Congresses. He was actively connected with higher education in Tennessee, serving as one of the founders of Blount College, which later became the University of Tennessee.

He retired from active pursuits and resided on Rhea plantation near Blountville, Sullivan County, Tennessee, where he died on May 27, 1832. He was interred in Blountville Cemetery.

== Legacy ==
He was remembered in a Rhea family history as "a Jeffersonian democrat and a friend of Andrew Jackson. He died, unmarried, and left a very large estate in lands, much of which had been Government grants for special services rendered."

In 1896, historian James Schouler deemed Rhea "a man never of much reputation, who is remembered in history only as one of [Andrew] Jackson's constant parasites." In 1957, Charles Sellers characterized Rhea as an "old crony" of Jackson.

Rhea County, Tennessee; Rheatown, Tennessee; and Rhea Springs, Tennessee; was named in his honor.

== Errata (?) ==
Several biographies of Rhea include statements to the effect that "Rhea completed his preparatory studies in 1780, and entered Princeton College." However while there was a Princeton graduate around this time by the name of John Rhea, the Princeton biographical dictionary maintains that he was a different person than the Tennessee congressman. In an extended footnote, the editors of Princetonians, 1776–1783, published by Princeton University Press, wrote:

"...much evidence suggests that the 1780 graduate was not the future congressman. Born in 1753, this John Rhea was somewhat older than the students in the Class of 1780. He was an ensign in a Va. unit for most of 1777, the year he is said to have come to Princeton. In April 1779 he was a staff officer to Col. Evan Shelby in the western campaign against the Chickamaugas. In 1780 he was not 'of Pennsylvania' but a resident of newly-created Sullivan Cnty., N.C. (subsequently Tenn.), serving as the county's first clerk from February of that year. Also said to have been at the Battle of Kings Mountain in S.C. on 7 Oct 1780, this John Rhea is unlikely to have received a degree at Princeton, New Jersey on 27 Sep 1780. Finally, the Tenn. congress man was still alive in 1830 when the triennial catalogue of that year first indicated the death of the 1780 graduate; and the graduate's name was not capitalized in any catalogue between 1780 and 1830, although capitalization was the customary method of designating graduates who held important state and federal offices."

== See also ==
- Rhea letter – Andrew Jackson controversy

== Sources ==
- Ely, James W. Jr.; Brown, Theodore Jr., eds. (1987). Legal Papers of Andrew Jackson. Knoxville, Tennessee: University of Tennessee Press. ISBN 978-0-87049-355-3. LCCN 82002635. OCLC 17590211.
- Hamer, Marguerite B. (January 1932). "John Rhea of Tennessee". East Tennessee Historical Society's Publications. 28. Tennessee Historical Commission, University of Tennessee. Knoxville, Tennessee: East Tennessee Historical Society: 35–44. ISSN 0361-6193. OCLC 1137265. FHL 1640746.
- Robinson, Dan M. (1967). "Robert Hays, Unsung Pioneer of the Cumberland, Country". Tennessee Historical Quarterly. 26 (3): 263–278. ISSN 0040-3261. JSTOR 42622953.
- Schouler, James (1896). "Monroe and the Rhea Letter". Historical Briefs. New York: Dodd, Mead, and Company. hdl:loc.gdc/scd0001.00114169651. LCCN 04016614. OCLC 1492064. OL 7033424M. (originally published as ——— (October 1884). "Monroe and the Rhea Letter". The Magazine of American History. Vol. XII, no. 4. New York: A. S. Barnes. pp. 308–322. ISSN 0361-6185. OCLC 1590082.)
- Sellers, Charles Grier (April 1957). "Jackson Men with Feet of Clay". The American Historical Review. 62 (3): 537–551. doi:10.2307/1847330.
- Jackson, Andrew (1980). Smith, Sam B.; Owsley, Harriet Chappell; Moser, Harold D. (eds.). The Papers of Andrew Jackson, Volume I, 1770–1803. Knoxville: University of Tennessee Press. doi:10.7290/utp7943. ISBN 978-0-8704-9219-8. LCCN 79015078. OCLC 5029597.
- Wells, Emma Helm Middleton (1927). The History of Roane County, Tennessee — Volume I: 1801–1870. Chattanooga, Tennessee: Lookout Publishing Company. LCCN 28003562. OCLC 2531250.
- United States Congress. "John Rhea (id: R000181)". Biographical Directory of the United States Congress.

U.S. House of Representatives
Preceded by District created	U.S. Representative from Tennessee; 1803–1815	Succeeded by District inactive
Preceded by Samuel Powell	U.S. Representative from Tennessee; 1817–1823	Succeeded by John Blair
