= Rhea letter =

Andrew Jackson controversy

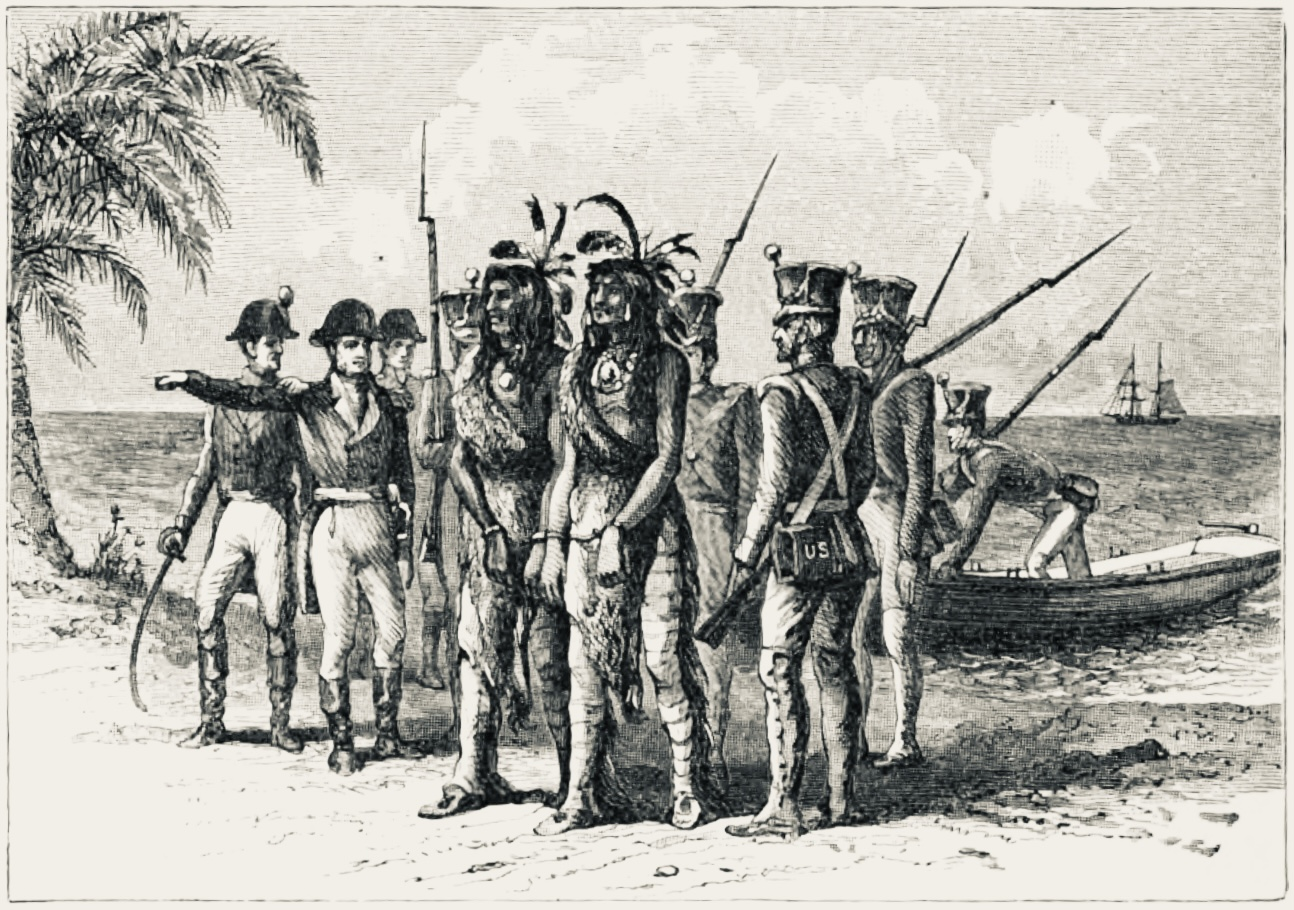
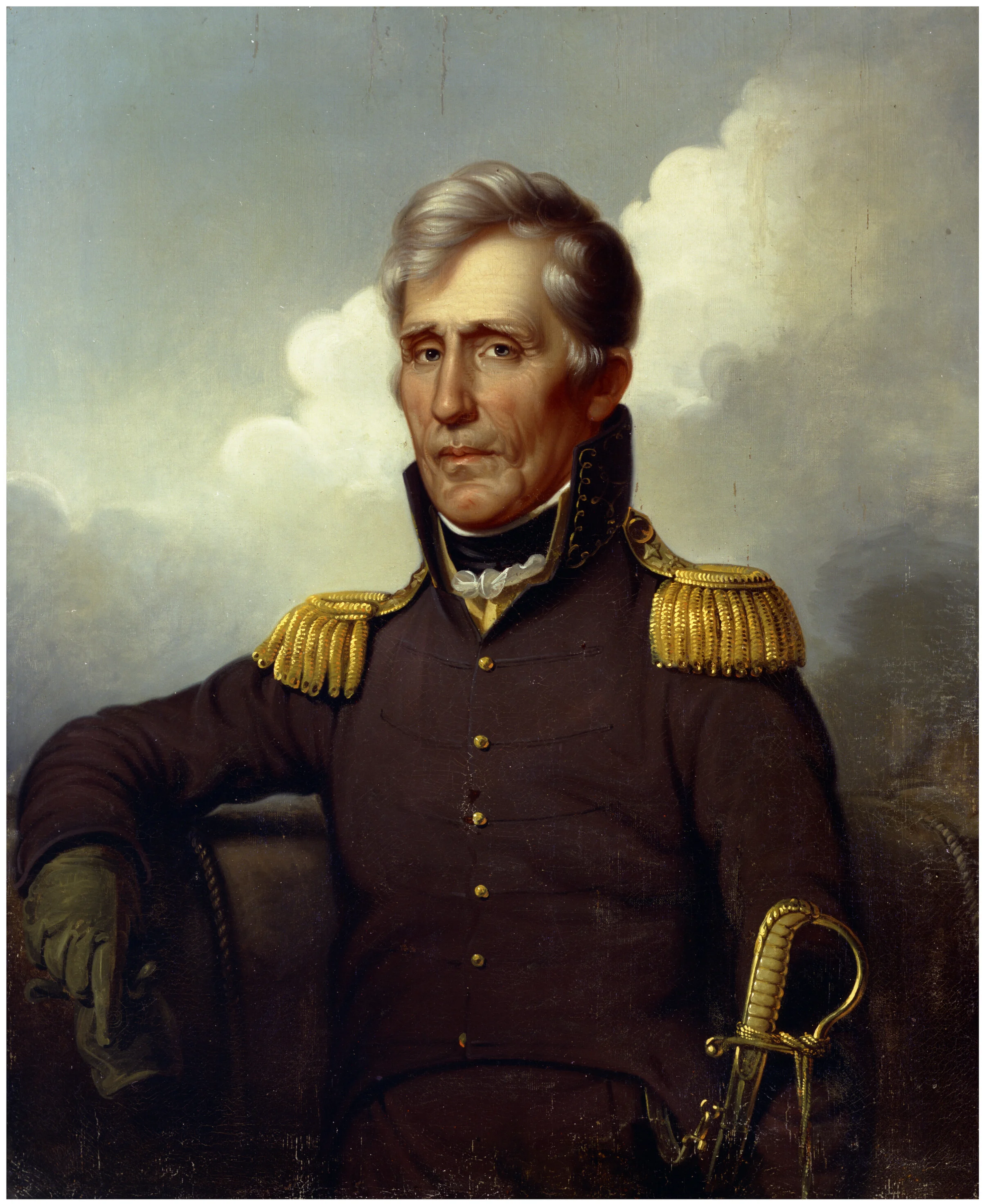
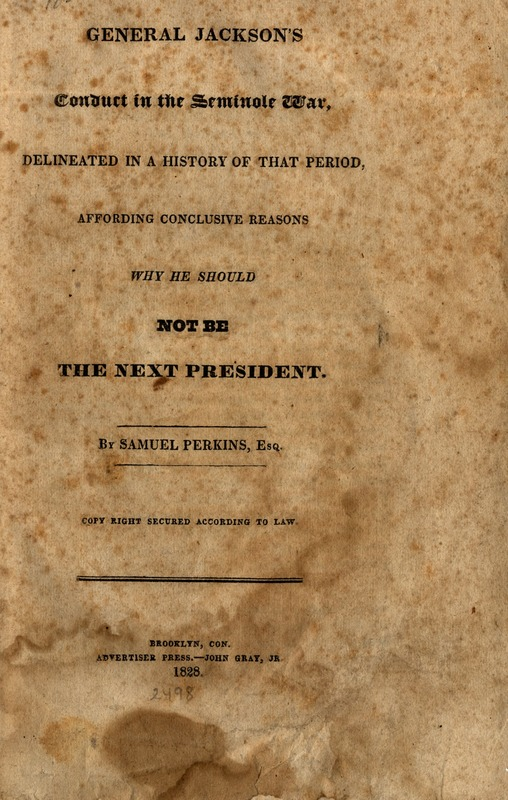
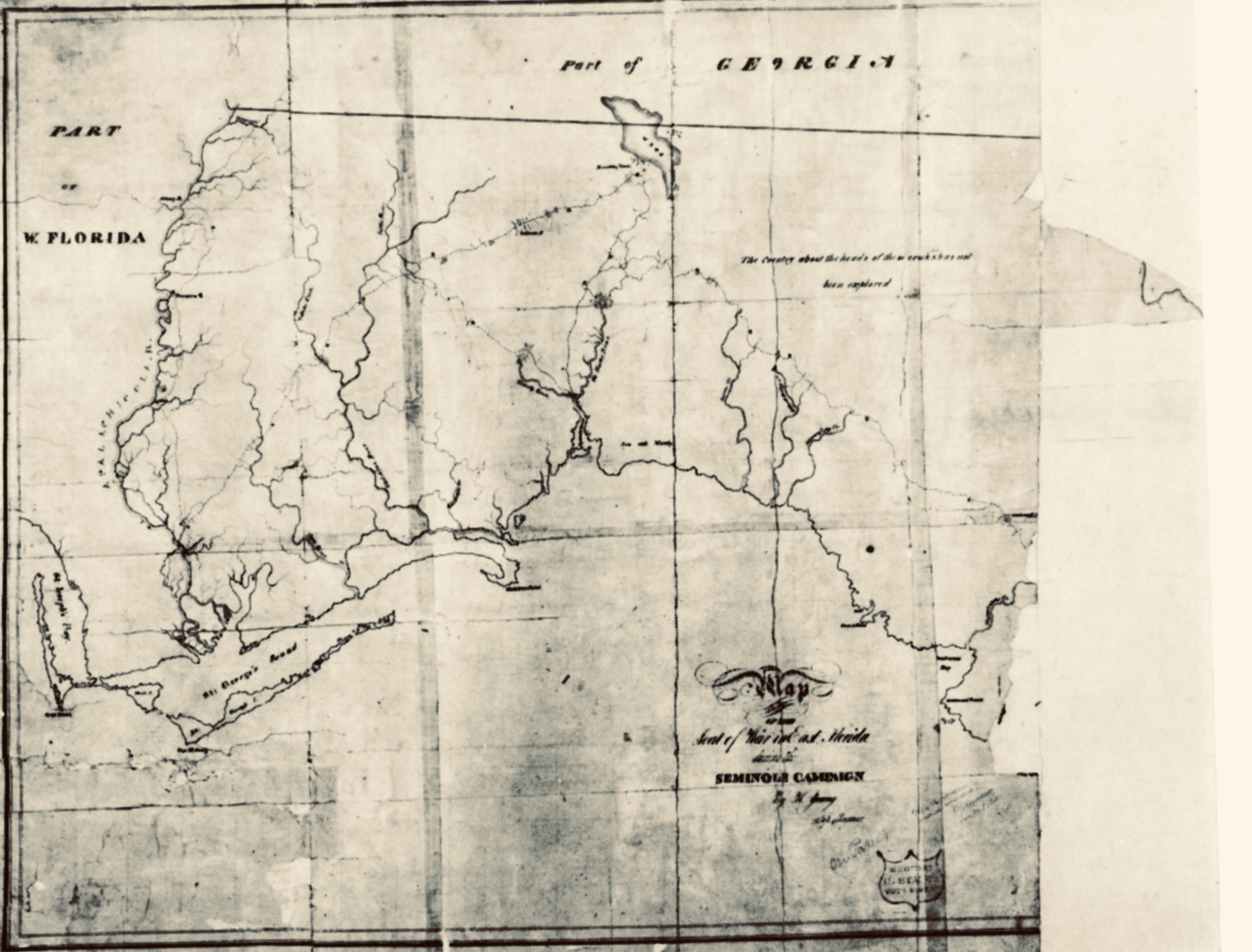
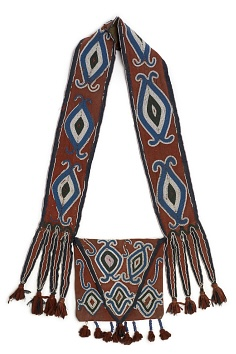
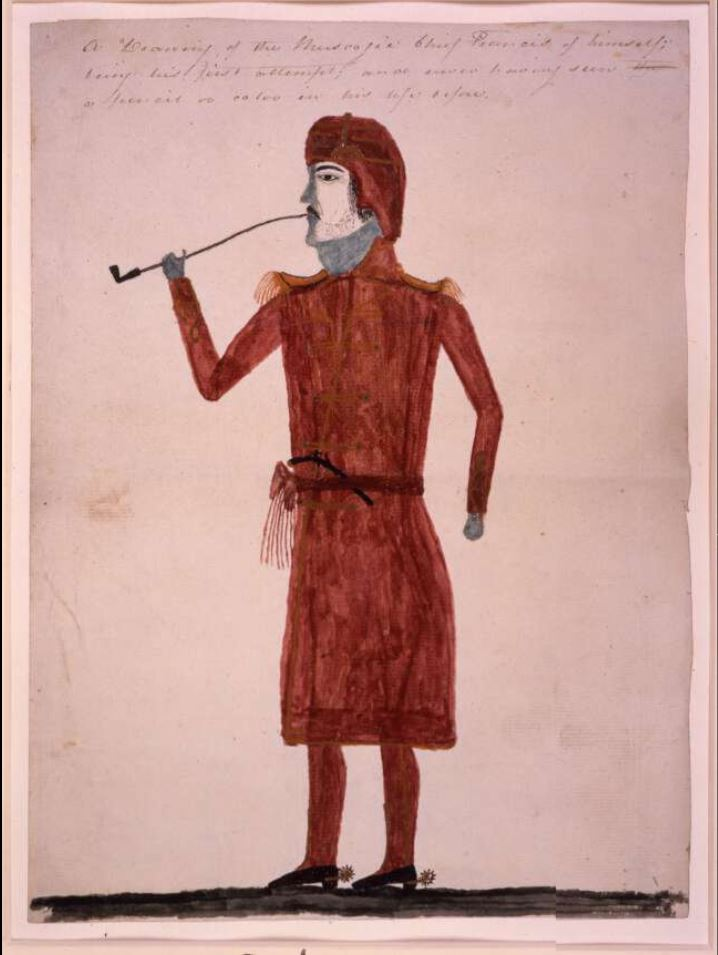
Conjectural illustration depicting the capture of Homathlemico and Francis the Prophet by Jackson's troops during the First Seminole War; Jackson painted by Rembrandt Peale during the Congressional investigation into his conduct; anti-Jackson literature criticizing the Florida invasion; map of Jackson's movements during the war; Seminole beadwork; self-portrait of Hillis Hadjo

The "Rhea letter" was an early 19th-century political controversy of the United States stemming from the First Seminole War and the contingent annexation of what is now the U.S. state of Florida. The controversy involves four (or rather three) key documents:

- the "Jackson January letter" sent by U.S. Army general Andrew Jackson to President James Monroe on January 6, 1818, with its later annotation that the "Rhea letter" had been burned;
- the presumably fictitious "Rhea letter" purportedly sent to Andrew Jackson by Tennessee congressman John Rhea at the behest of James Monroe in February 1818;
- the vaguely threatening letter sent to former U.S. president James Monroe on his deathbed in June 1831 by John Rhea at the behest of Andrew Jackson;
- the "Denunciation of the Insinuations of John Rhea" written by James Monroe as the last document he ever signed.

This chain of evidence relates to Andrew Jackson's after-the-fact rationalization and defense of his unauthorized invasion of Florida in 1818, a campaign that now goes by the name First Seminole War. This conspiracy and the extended controversy over Jackson's 1818 Florida campaign played out against the background of the dispossession and expulsion of Indigenous people from their lands in what is now the southeastern United States, the politics of the 1824, 1828, and 1832 U.S. presidential campaigns, and the Jackson–William H. Crawford–John C. Calhoun hate triangle that emerged after the last Founding Father president left office. The controversy surrounding the 1818 invasion, and the Monroe administration's response, resurfaced a dozen years later and played a central role in the Jackson administration backbiting in 1831 that led to Calhoun's departure from the vice presidency in 1832.

Since the late 19th century historians have broadly agreed that Andrew Jackson lied that he had been secretly granted secret special permission by James Monroe to invade Florida, when in fact he had been only copied on orders granting permission to pacify Seminoles, but specifically prohibiting engagement with the Spanish forts in Florida, and that he then conspired to create false evidence that such an order had been given. Jackson wanted Florida, so he took Florida, and both the Monroe administration and the 15th Congress ultimately shrugged at the illegality of the popular 60-day war, but there was, however, just enough heat to the charges that Jackson scrambled to excuse himself through a combination of obfuscation and outright falsehood. Both John Quincy Adams and historian Richard Stenberg described Jackson's "Rhea letter" scheme as "depraved". The notion of the first "Rhea letter" can fairly be put in scare quotes, as historians have variously described it as a hoax, a total fabrication, and a brazen lie, or in the best possible reading, cover for a shambolic imperial blitzkrieg "steeped in an air of guilty complicity". The current editor of The Papers of Andrew Jackson stated in 2010 that "the judgment of most historians" on the "Rhea letter" question is that "not only did [it] not exist, but could not have existed." From Jackson's "self-righteously justified in a rhetorically rigid but flexibly pragmatic" perspective, honesty and honor were foolish notions and quite beside the point. In the words of United States Military Academy history professor Stephen J. Watson, "Old Hickory [that is, Andrew Jackson] was determined to secure the southern borderlands for American landholders, of whom he was characteristic, by whatever means he considered necessary, and his iron will drove this bellicose approach to defense and the aggrandizement of American interests from the War of 1812 until his death."

== First Seminole War ==
Andrew Jackson had signaled his interest in annexing Florida for many years. In October and November 1814, during the Creek War, Jackson repeatedly angled for permission from President James Monroe to capture Pensacola from the Spanish; Monroe responded too late to forestall Jackson's request, writing with a hard no on October 21, when Jackson was already on the road, arriving at the gates of Fort Barrancas on November 7; "given the Virginian's record of support for Mathews, Gutiérrez, and the West Florida rebels, and his later convenient lapses of attention as president and commander in chief during Jackson's second invasion of Florida in 1818, one has to be suspicious." (Shorter: Jackson took Pensacola in 1814, but they made him give it back, but there were no consequences for his actions, so he was only minimally discouraged.) Two years later, in 1816, Monroe "reassured Jackson...that the transfer of Florida from Spain to the United States was inevitable," in the course of time, with diplomatic talks ongoing. Simultaneously, the empires based across the Atlantic signaled their "acquiescence, however reluctant" to American adventurism; Spain's long-term strategy was to reallocate forces to secure "the northern boundary of Mexico, hoping for some restraint on American recognition of Latin rebels in return for ceding Florida to the United States."

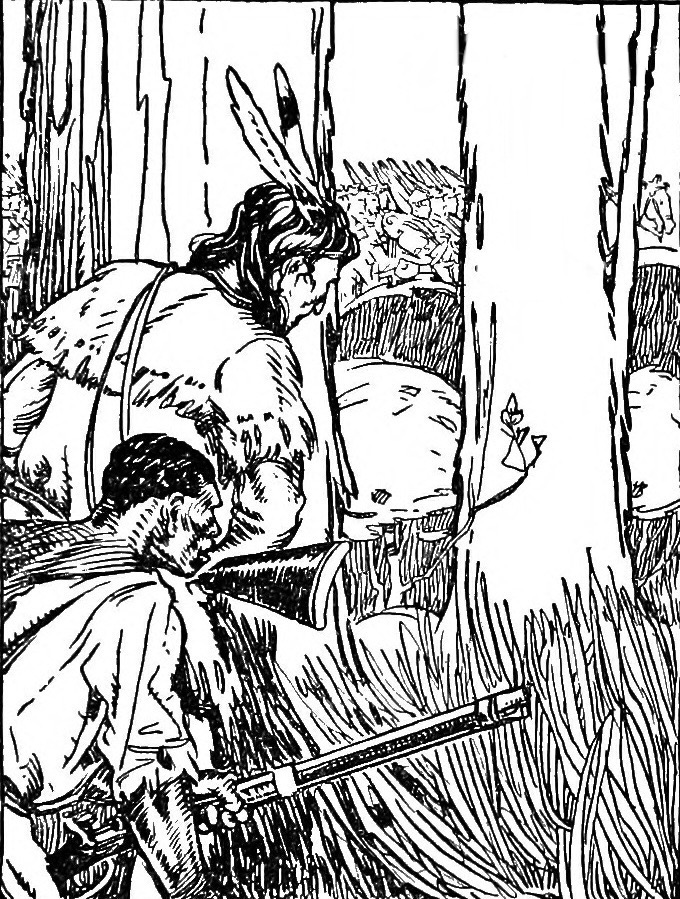
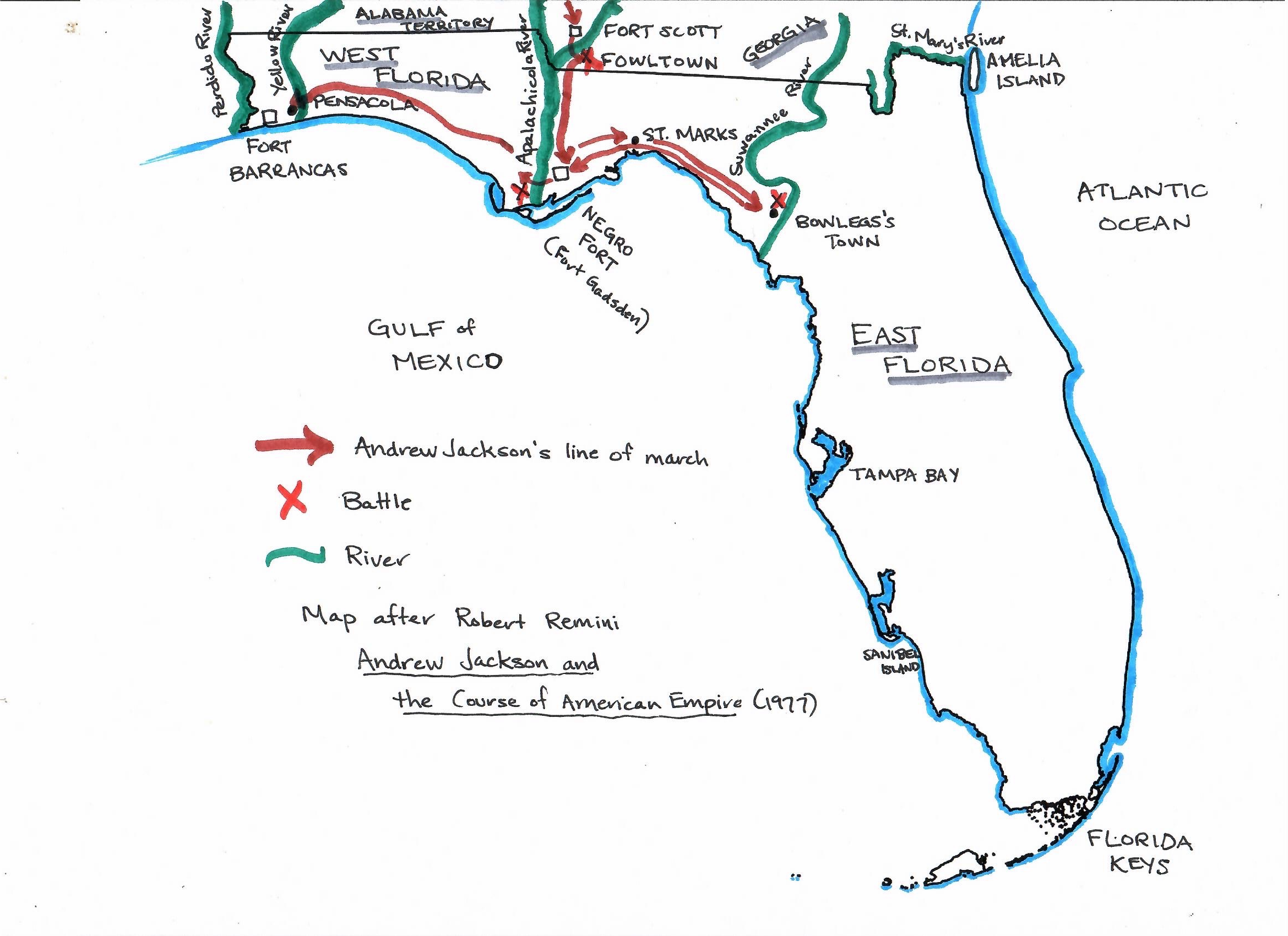
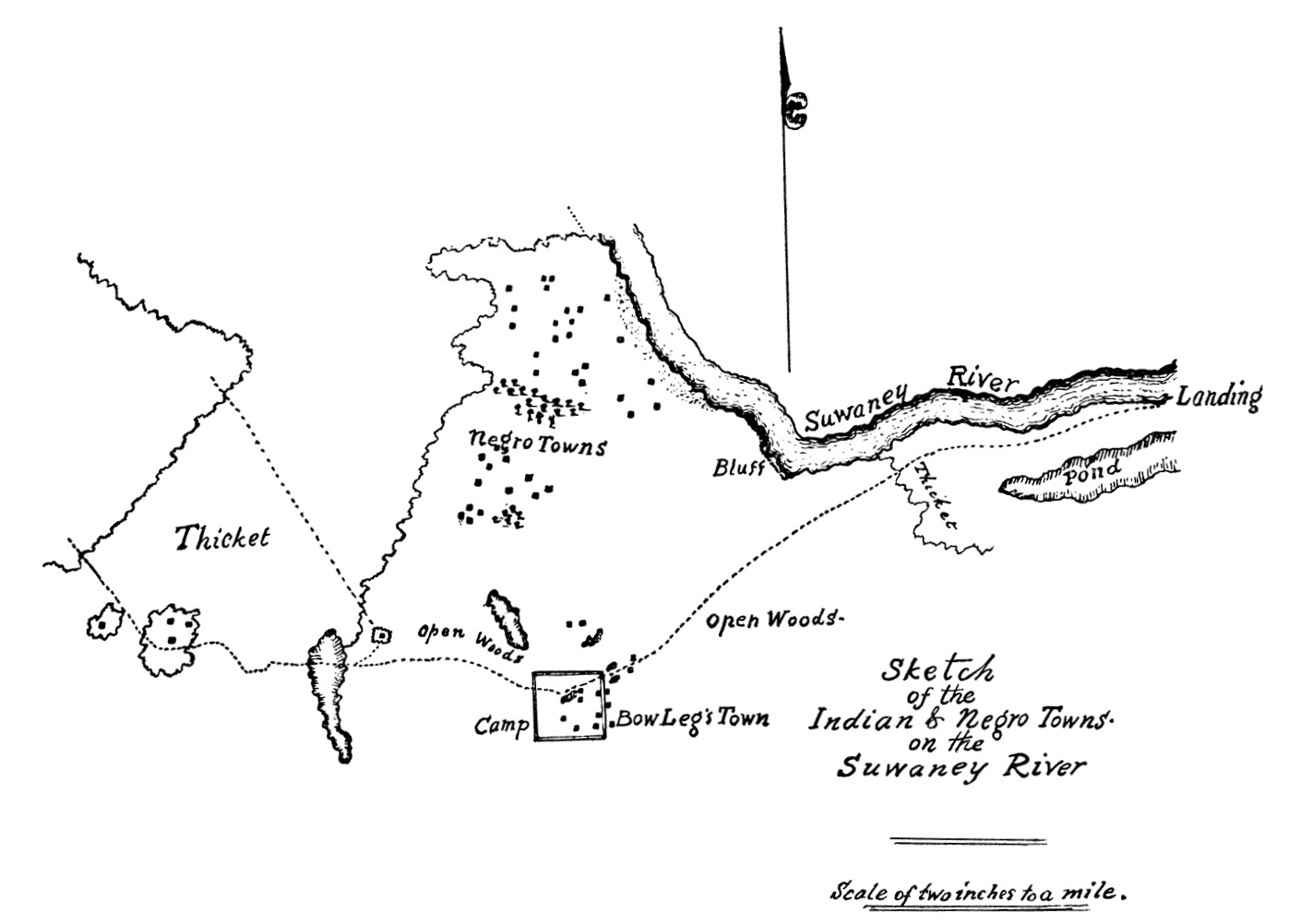
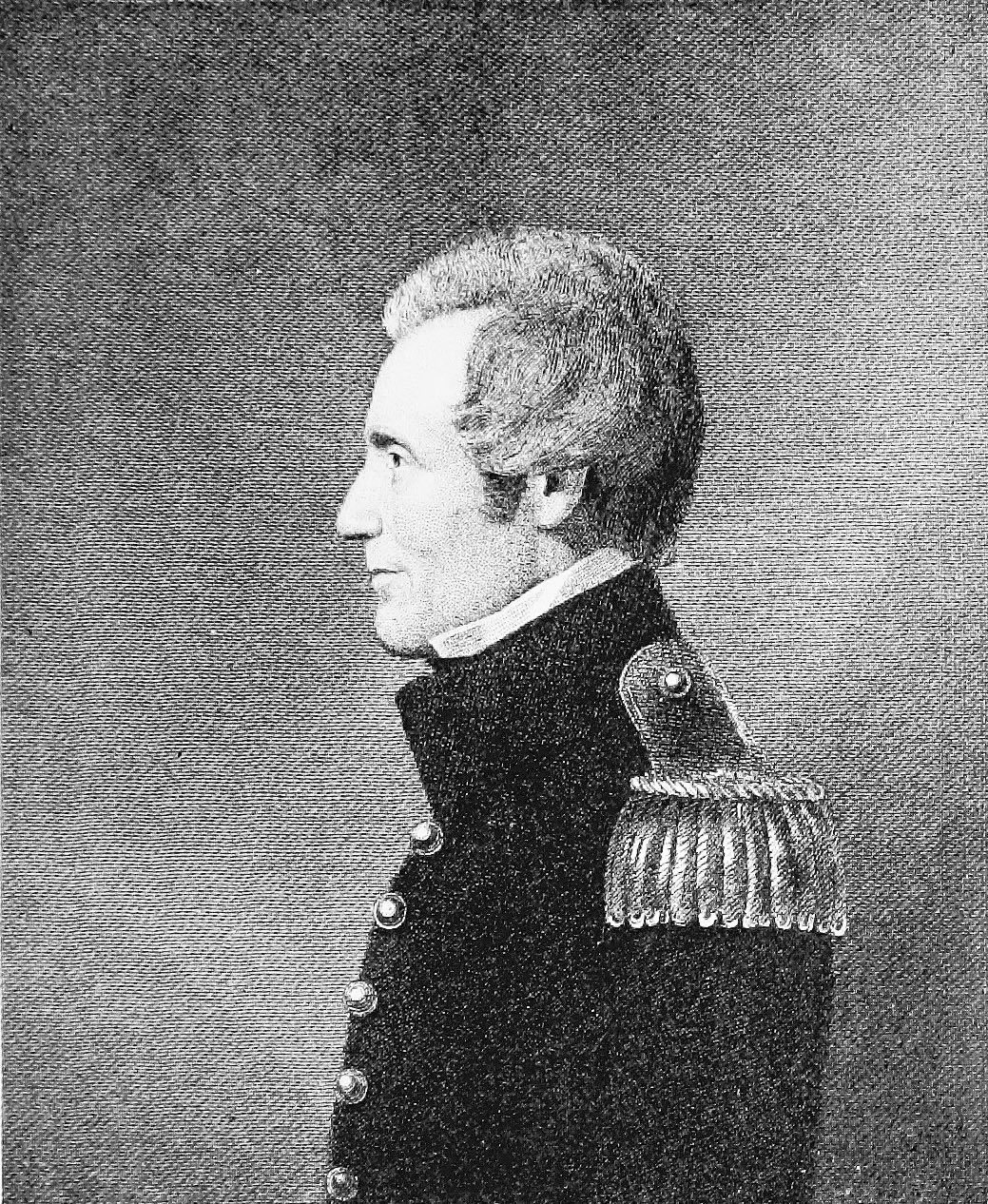
Illustration of "The Florida Exiles; — A History Story seldom Told — Seminoles and Maroons" from a 1906 history of the growth of the U.S. South; map of route taken by Jackson's raiders; map of settlements near the Suwanee River; commander Edmund P. Gaines

West and East Florida were backwater provinces of the Spanish Empire, populated by Indigenous natives and refugees from displaced tribes, fugitive slaves (some of whom had escaped there as early as the American Revolutionary War; the most Florida-naturalized early arrivals were sometimes termed maroons or Exiles), mixed-race people, and a few thousand settlers in the capitals of Pensacola and St. Augustine. Part of Jackson's motive for conquest was that he had unfinished business with Red Stick survivors of the Creek War of 1813–1814. Many Red Stick warriors and their families had been killed in the battles at Tallusahatchee and Tohopeka, but a number of Red Stick refugees settled just beyond the southern border of Alabama in the Florida lands. Eventually the increasing population of white settlers in the area and the combined population of Creek refugees, fugitive slaves, and a developing community known to history as the Seminoles were tangling with each other across the border, raiding cattle and horses, and retaliating in turn. The immediately precipitating incident of Jackson's blitzkrieg action through Florida in the spring of 1818 was the Scott massacre, the slaughter of U.S. soldiers and their families on the Apalachicola River. The actual commander of U.S. troops in the south at the time was Edmund P. Gaines, but he had been ordered to Amelia Island in the Atlantic Ocean on the far side of Florida near the Georgia border, so Jackson took the initiative to invade without clearing it with any superior officer or the federal government. On January 8, 1818, he wrote James Monroe stating his goal of seizing East Florida and asking that the government give its approval with a wink and a nod in the form of a letter from John Rhea.

The Executive Government have ordered (and, as I conceive, very properly) Amelia Island to be taken possession of; this order ought to be carried into execution at all hazards, and, simultaneously, the whole of East Florida seized...this can be done without implicating the Government; let it be signifyed to me through any channel, (say Mr. J. Rhea) that the possession of the Floridas would be desirable to the United States, & in sixty days it will be accomplished.

— Andrew Jackson, January 6, 1818

Jackson's actions, while ultimately defended by the executive branch, including President Monroe and Secretary of State John Quincy Adams, were clearly both illegal and insubordinate. Among many other "irregularities," Jackson's orders were to "call on the governors of Georgia and Alabama for militia," but he ultimately assembled a force composed largely of Tennessee volunteers who were veterans of his Creek War campaign. With these loyal followers at his back, he wrote John Coffee, he had a hedge against a possible Georgian "mutiny" against his command, which he could then "put down, & drive into the Gulf all the Indians and adherents be them who they may." (By adherents Jackson meant Blacks, Brits, and Spaniards.)

Jackson's circle was already congratulating itself in July 1818 when Robert Butler, Jackson's ward, and aide, and soon to be the acting American governor of East Florida, toasted at a dinner to "The Floridas—Ours, without 16 years negotiation."

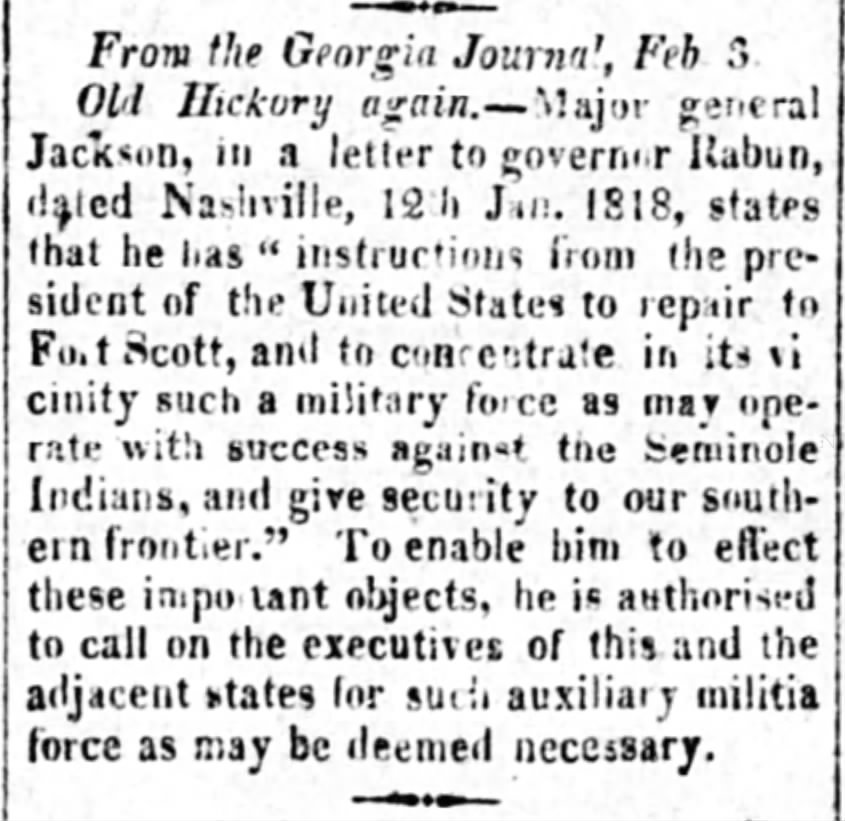
Report about Jackson's orders from Monroe, originally published in the Georgia Journal of Milledgeville on February 3, reprinted Alexandria Gazette, February 18, 1818

In the words of historians Jeanne T. and David S. Heidler, Jackson's capture of Pensacola and Spanish forts were "not only beyond the scope of Jackson's orders but explicitly prohibited by them. Quite obviously Jackson had made war on a foreign power without congressional approval." During the course of the raid, troops led by Jackson sacked and burned at least 300 houses of Seminole and Black families along Lake Miccosukee, and on the right bank of the Apalachicola. They also demolished the black refugee settlements near the Suwannee River (estimated population 400), "indiscriminately" killing, detaining, and generally terrorizing blacks, Seminoles, and Creek people along the way.

Jackson's first-phase defense of the invasion was "ambiguity." Stenberg concludes that Jackson's invasion of Florida was not just self-authorized and premeditated but that he intended to force the annexation of Florida on the Monroe administration. Per Stenberg, Jackson says as much in letters of June 1818 to James Monroe and August 1818 to Secretary of State John C. Calhoun. Jackson's awareness of the existence of laws of war and the need for both justification and jurisdiction is found in his message to Washington that his capture of the Spanish fort at St. Mark's was warranted because "hostile Indians threatened the garrison, the Spaniards were too weak to defend it, and the Americans needed it as a supply depot during the war."

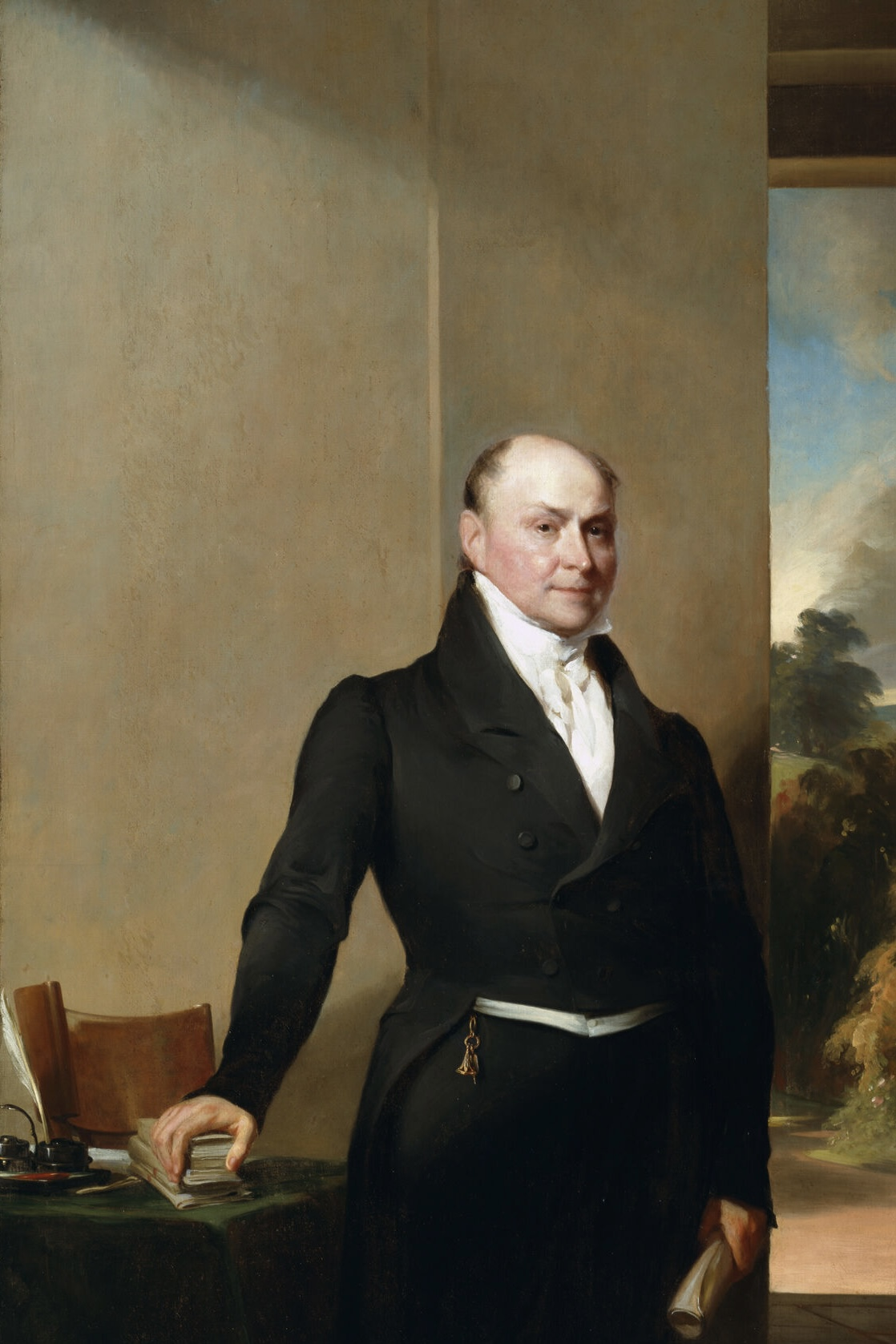
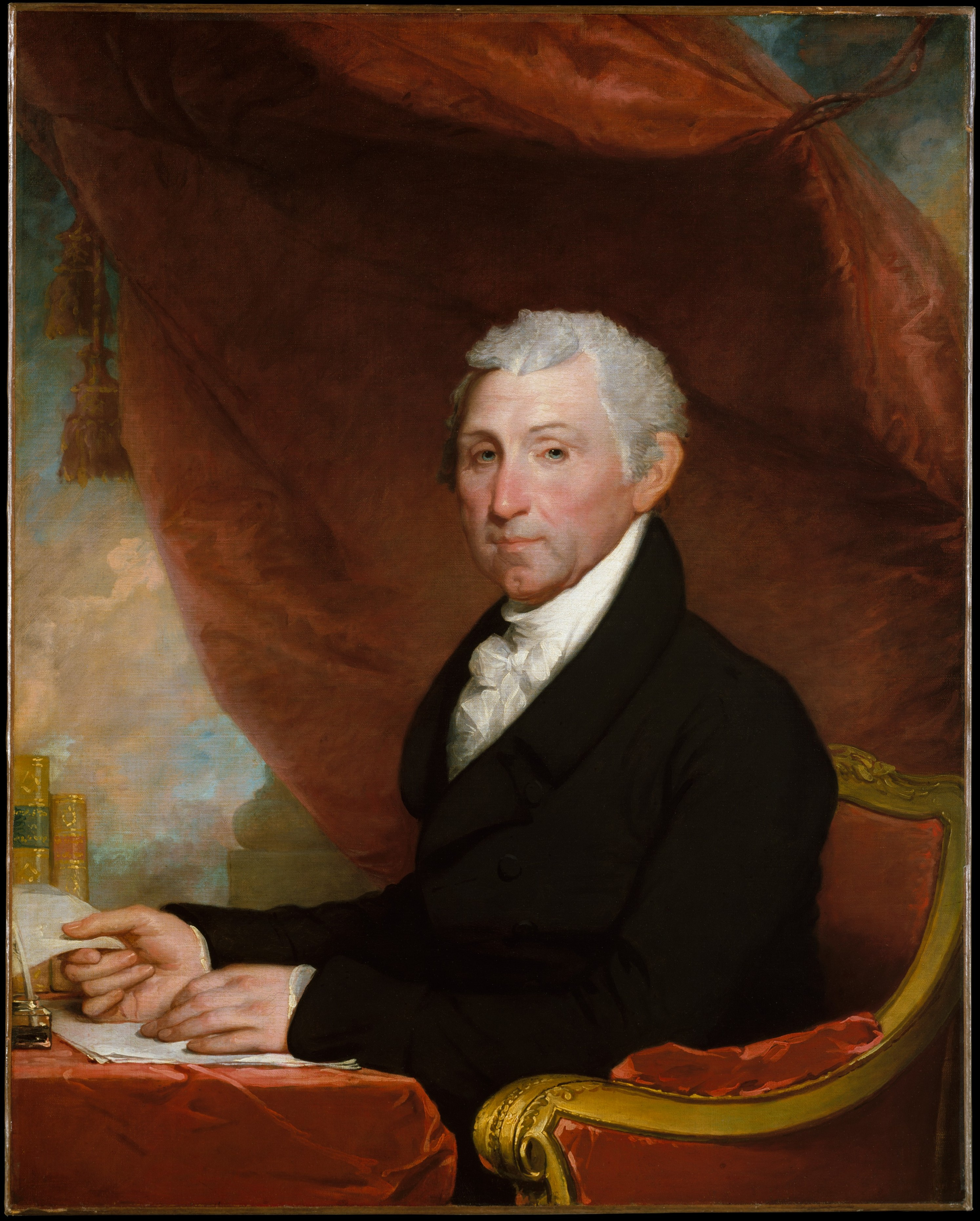
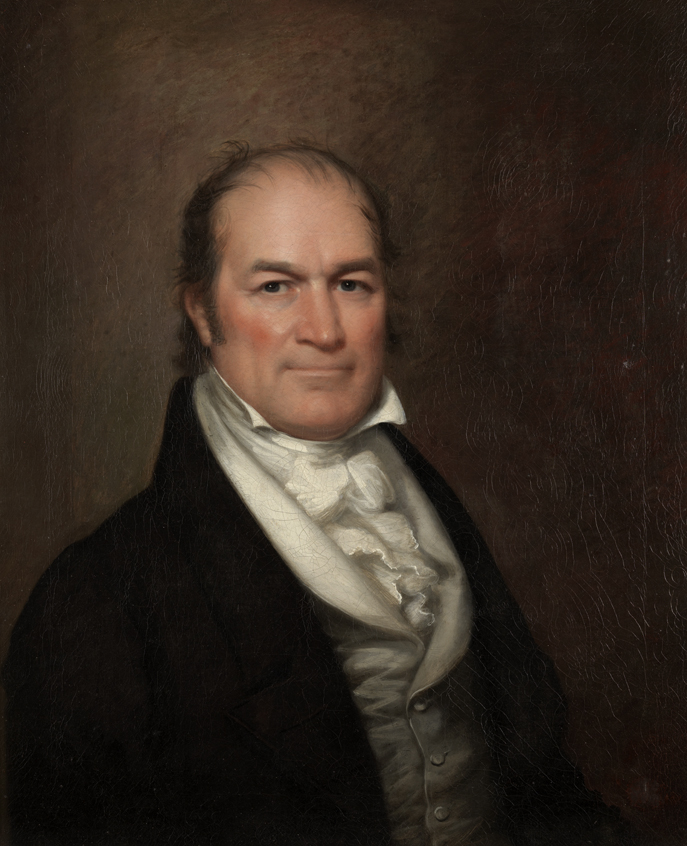
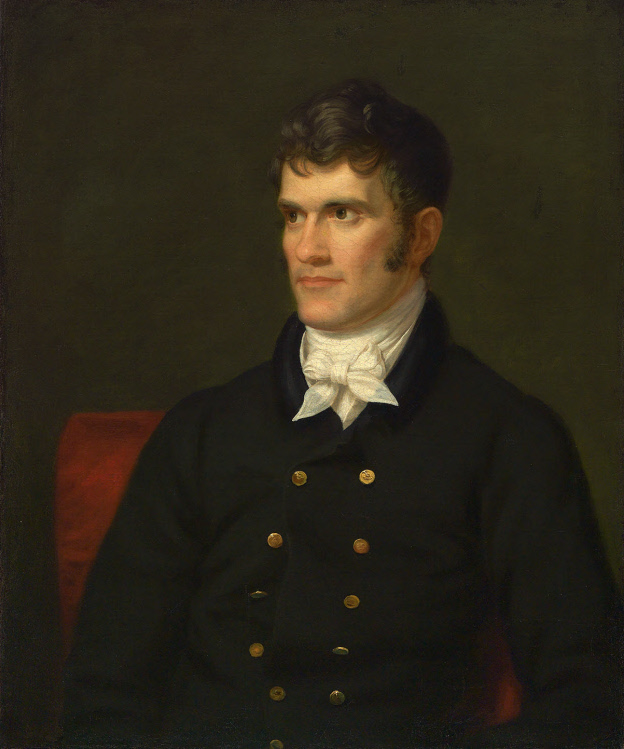
Clockwise from top left: Secretary of State John Quincy Adams, President James Monroe, Secretary of War John C. Calhoun, Secretary of the Treasury William H. Crawford

Immediately before departing for the invasion, Jackson had written to Monroe saying that if he wanted to approve the capture of Florida to please send a letter through John Rhea, who had served in Congress as a Representative from 1803 until 1815, and again 1817 to 1823; but "neither the evidence nor anyone's behavior in the months that followed indicates that Jackson ever received a direct answer from Monroe or an indirect response from Monroe through John Rhea that would have altered the instructions in the December 16 orders." As historian James Schouler told it in 1896, "Jackson's January letter, it is perceived, indicates on the general's part a personal wish to carry the war into Spain precisely as he afterwards did. Heedless, perhaps, of the duplicity, of the lawlessness to which such a course must have committed the responsible Executive of the United States, Jackson urged Monroe to drop only a sly hint, and in sixty days the Floridas would be ours. The secret channel indicated was through John Rhea, better known to statesmen of the day as 'Johnny Rhea,' — a member of Congress for many years from Tennessee, a native of Ireland, a man never of much reputation, who is remembered in history only as one of Jackson's constant parasites." However, "Monroe never read nor reflected upon Jackson's January letter at all until after Pensacola had fallen." Letters written by Monroe in both 1818 (to Jackson) and 1827 (to Calhoun) both state this, and Monroe's claim is validated by J. Q. Adams' contemporaneous journal entries. The journal of Secretary of State John Quincy Adams shows "the capture of Pensacola was an entire surprise to the Cabinet, Calhoun included, and to the President, who had summoned them for counsel."

Beginning in December 1818, Jackson's communications team began suggesting that perhaps it was "Monroe's failure to answer his January letter" that was at fault, and from "the General may have inferred sanction of his proposal," but historian Richard Sternberg deems this argument "as unsound as it was improper." That the feeble excuse of "misunderstanding" was untenable was also the holding of the Monroe administration, which "parsed the orders to show that his reading of them made no sense. How could Jackson argue, Monroe asked Calhoun in exasperation, that Gaines's orders did not apply to him? If that had been so, Jackson had not possessed authority even to invade Florida. Calhoun's December 26 orders had only told Jackson to repair to the border and, if necessary, request militia reinforcement." Meanwhile, as Monroe and the cabinet met daily to manage the crisis, "Calhoun remained intractable about the event itself, especially its author. He argued that Jackson had set a dangerous precedent by disobeying orders, particularly by making war on his own authority, and he must be publicly reprimanded." Calhoun was consistent in this, and others may have agreed with him, but publicly holding Jackson to account and charging him with making war illegally and on his own authority diminished both the authority of Monroe's government and eroded the advantage he had won for American negotiators in the ongoing talks for what became the Adams–Onís Treaty.

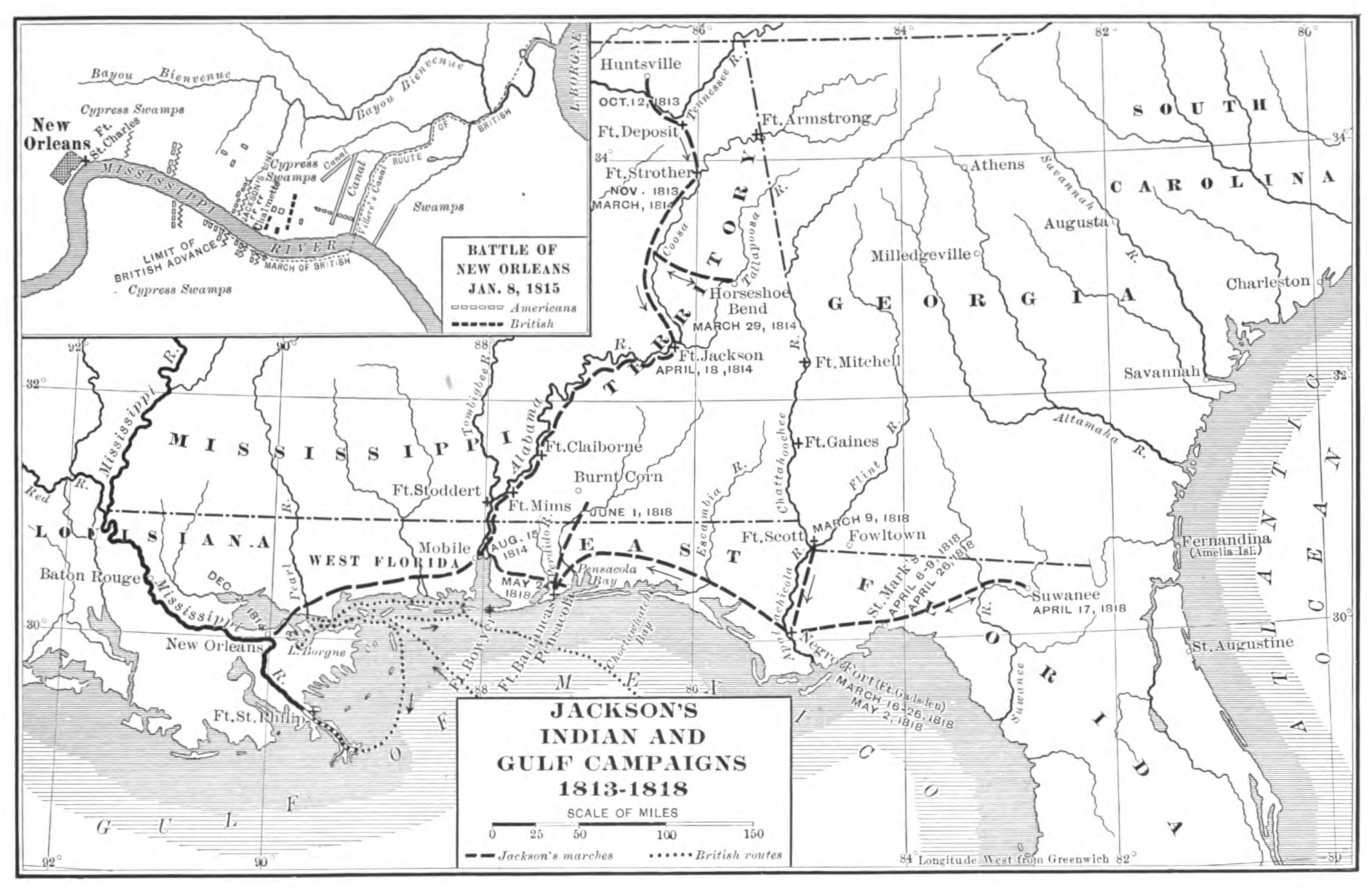
Andrew Jackson's Indian and Gulf campaigns, 1813–1818 (The American Nation, 1907)

In 2008, a letter from Andrew Jackson to Rachel Jackson, written just south of Hartford, Georgia, on February 19, 1818, was sold at auction. The letter concluded, "P.S. Preserve with care the letter of Mr. John Rhea which I enclose. A.J." This led historian Daniel Feller to conclude that "there really was a letter—some letter—from Johnny Rhea." However, this "absolutely crucial letter—one that sanctioned a campaign of conquest—[was] unremembered by the man who sent it (until he was heavily prompted), denied on his deathbed by the man who purportedly authorized it, mysteriously burnt by the man who received it, and unmentioned by anyone for a dozen years after the fact, years during which the entire history of Jackson's Florida campaign was replayed in the Cabinet, in Congress, and in the press, over and over and over again." The predominant theory on this is that "Rhea wrote Jackson a string of surviving letters from Washington around this time, all offering assurances of Monroe's entire confidence and friendship in the wake of a recent dispute between Jackson and the War Department over protocol and the chain of command. The purport of such soothing words could be easily misunderstood. Probably Rhea said something vague in this letter that Jackson interpreted, or misinterpreted, or chose to interpret, as a license from Monroe to do as he pleased in Florida. That would also explain why Jackson later destroyed the letter. Jackson's campaign was ferociously controversial almost from the start, and it is hardly conceivable that he would, at any time, no matter who asked him, destroy the one piece of evidence that incontrovertibly vindicated him. Unless, of course, as he later realized when re-reading it, it didn't." As for Monroe's conduct, Feller holds deems him culpable: "Monroe did not give the tipoff, but neither did he rebuke Jackson or relieve him on the spot. Instead he (either foolishly or cleverly) misplaced [Jackson's January 18] letter."

== 1819 investigation ==
In the wake of Jackson's First Seminole War, the legislative branch of the national government, the U.S. Congress, opened an investigation, one of the first such Congressional investigations ever conducted. There were two notable speeches made in the Congress about the situation. One was made by Henry Clay, later to be an opponent of Andrew Jackson in the 1832 presidential election and a target of Jackson's lifelong animus toward anyone who thwarted his will. Clay urged censure and argued that enabling Jackson was tantamount to enabling the destruction of the American Republic as Caesar's victories in Gaul had been the death knell of the Roman Republic:

Remember, that Greece had her Alexander, Rome had her Caesar, England her Cromwell, France her Bonaparte, and, that, if we would escape the rock on which they split, we must avoid their errors. In the provinces, were laid the abuses and the seeds of the ambitious projects which overturned the liberties of Rome.

The other historically significant speech came from William Lowndes of South Carolina, a widely respected member of the House, who argued that the power to declare war was reserved to the Congress under the United States Constitution. Further, if Monroe had the power to order action against the people called Seminoles, which was the legal basis for Jackson's attack, then so did Monroe have the power to forbid engagement with the Spanish. This restriction had been stated in newly installed Secretary of War Calhoun's orders to his officers (Gaines and Jackson) in late 1817. Moreover, Lowndes argued, Monroe's role as civilian commander-in-chief had been reiterated when Monroe ordered the return of the forts to the Spanish after the fact. Moreover, Lowndes reminded his fellow Representatives that the year before Jackson launched his attack, the Congress assembled had collectively defeated a motion by John Forsyth urging the seizure of Florida. Thus, the position of both the executive and the legislature had been clear and explicit that U.S. forces were prohibited from engaging with Spanish forces or harassing Spanish installations, both of which Jackson had done on his "Florida adventure," along with summary executions of two Creek leaders, Hillis Hadjo and Homathlemico, whom he had lured ashore with a British flag, and two British allies of the Florida Seminole, Ambrister and Arbuthnot. Jackson's actions were an expression of the expansionist American position that war against Spain was warranted because colonial officers were "neglecting the obligations of neutrality by allowing British agents to act freely in Spanish territory, permitting fugitive slaves to take refuge in Florida, and aiding and abetting Indians who were hostile to the United States." Spain's foreign minister Luis Onís had denied and provided documentary rebuttals to all such arguments.

In the end, the U.S. House of Representatives bowed to Jackson's popularity and the geopolitical advantage of having bullied Spain out of Florida. The report created by the investigating committee was "highly critical of Jackson," but the whole House "defeated the censorious majority report," voting down all proposed resolutions criticizing Jackson or the war. The U.S. Senate never even held a vote on what to do with the report of the Select Committee.

Jackson's summary seizure of the Spanish posts was a popular act, and such he had meant it to be. Our people, and those especially of the Western States, had long borne with impatience the delays of a fruitless diplomacy, confident all the while that in order to obtain a full settlement of spoliation claims, old and new, and gain title to a territory once paid for, as to West Florida at least, when Louisiana was purchased, nothing could be easier than to march a resolute body of troops into Florida, dislodge the Spanish garrisons, and take possession in the name of the United States. This Jackson did on his own responsibility; and already the most conspicuous man of the age among our military generals, he leaped at once into prominence as a candidate for the next presidency.

— James Schouler (1896)

== 1827–1832 political warfare ==
The circumstances of exactly how and why Jackson launched the first Seminole War were turned into campaign issue during the 1824 United States presidential election by Jesse Benton Jr. The brothers Benton, Jesse and his brother Thomas Hart Benton (later a Jacksonian Democratic U.S. Senator from Missouri), had a long and storied relationship with Andrew Jackson dating back almost to the turn of the century. One incident of note was that Jesse Benton shot Jackson in an 1813 Nashville bar brawl. Jesse Benton's claim in 1824, made in a statement addressed "To All Candid and Reflecting Men," was that:

"Previous to the Seminole campaign, and previous to the General's leaving Nashville, a friend of his, Capt. John Gordon, and a nephew of Mrs. Jackson's, Capt. John Donelson, were dispatched to Pensacola, where they bought 220 lots in town, and 1300 acres of land one mile from it. Gordon told me, that they drew on Orleans for the money, and were authorized to draw for a very large amount more than they laid out. He refused to tell me who the purchases were made for. He further stated, that he went directly from that place, and joined the General, who had by this time gone on. He stated that he had left Jackson in the Seminole country, but that he would return directly home, and send General Gaines to occupy Pensacola. It turned out that Jackson had to come by himself and seize the place. John H. Eaton, James Jackson, and others of the General's friends, are known to be concerned in this speculation."

Historians believe Gordon may have been an employee or business partner of Jackson's before the War of 1812, and he has been described as Jackson's "personal spymaster" during the campaigns against the Creek and the British. (Note: Jesse Benton's brother, at least, had ties to Gordon and Jackson going back to 1804, as on February 14, 1804, Jackson, U.S. District Court Judge John McNairy, surveyor William T. Lewis, and Tennessee pioneer James Robertson were "subscribers" to a contract between Gordon and William Colbert, one of the mixed-raced Colbert brothers of the Chickasaw Nation, agreeing to establish and jointly operate a stand and ferry across the Duck River along the Natchez Trace. Young Thomas Benton worked as a clerk or "factor" at Gordon's Ferry on the Duck River.) One of the U.S. Senators from Tennessee, John Williams, had made similar claims as early as 1819, and as such, was one of only four Senators who voted against the ratification of the Adams–Onís treaty. Come 1824 Williams wrote to Martin Van Buren of candidate Jackson, "He is with all his fury decidedly the most cunning man I have ever encountered. I speak from experience as you all will before the contest is over."

"MAP TO ILLUSTRATE THE ACQUISITION OF WEST FLORIDA" from Isaac Joslin Cox's The West Florida Controversy, 1798–1813: a Study In American Diplomacy (1918) I. Territory added to the original jurisdiction of West Florida by Great Britain in 1767; in dispute between Spain and the United States, 1783–1795; relinquished by Spain in the Treaty of 1795 and definitely occupied by the United States in 1798. II. Territory claimed by the United States, 1803–18I0, as part of the Louisiana Purchase; proclaimed independent by its inhabitants, September, 1810, and occupied by the United States in the following December; incorporated with the State of Louisiana in 1812. III. Claimed by the United States as above; brought under its military and civil jurisdiction in 1811; incorporated with Mississippi Territory in 1812. IV. Claimed by the United States as above; American jurisdiction proclaimed there by Orleans Territory Governor William C. C. Claiborne (1811) and by Governor of Mississippi Territory David L. Holmes (1812), except in the town of Mobile; occupied by the military forces of the United States, April, 1813, and the civil jurisdiction of Mississippi established there; later part of Alabama. V. Invaded by Andrew Jackson, in 1814 and 1818; ceded by Spain to the United States in the Treaty of 1819; part of Florida.

In any case, somewhere along the way between 1818 and his 1828 presidential run, Andrew Jackson "...convinced at least himself that he in fact had entered Florida with positive instructions from Monroe to seize the Spanish posts." It was in approximately 1827, the year before his second of three presidential campaigns that "Jackson and his operatives here for the first time flirted with the lie they would brazenly tell four years later in the midst of another feud. They were in the process of inventing the myth that Monroe had authorized Jackson through John Rhea to seize Florida." He then proceeded to manufacture a vendetta against Calhoun and lay a trap for him, as he had done already done once with Monroe in 1818 and would clumsily do again in 1831.

It may here be relevant to note that Jackson's government was never a team of rivals nor a brain trust but a cabal dominated by his Tennessee cronies, including John H. Eaton, and William B. Lewis, with the latter-day inclusion of New Yorker Martin Van Buren, who eventually became Jackson's chosen successor. Immediately after the expedition to Pensacola, Jackson had claimed he was simply acting on his own best judgment as an American war leader in the absence of timely direct orders from the distant federal government. A dozen years later, now President, he changed his defense to "President Monroe had explicitly authorized him" to attack. According to the Heidlers, "The prism of his egocentrism was again bending the truth to shape it as he saw it, recasting a series of events that unfolded in the Florida wilderness as he had made war on Spaniards, Seminoles, and Creek refugees." John C. Calhoun, who had ended up as Jackson's vice president and who had been Secretary of War under Monroe was suddenly cornered by the ambitious Van Buren, who accused of him of having wrongly claimed during Cabinet discussions of Jackson's surprise actions that the raid was treasonous and wrongful; "John C. Calhoun was not a man who generally invites sympathy, but in this case one almost has to feel sorry for him. He was being set up and he knew it." Jackson had been in the wrong, Calhoun had been defending basic U.S. constitutional principles of civilian oversight and military chain-of-command. Jackson made himself the victim and together with Van Buren eventually drove Calhoun out of the vice presidency. The cabal, including Van Buren (who "glides along as smoothly as oil and as silently as a cat") and "kitchen Machiavelli" Lewis, "used a variety of personal incidents, particularly the Eaton Affair, to poison the President's mind against the proud Carolinian....The nation, however, knew nothing of this...until the summer of 1830, when the President used a letter from William H. Crawford, asserting that it was Calhoun who had advocated his court-martial in Monroe's cabinet, because of his violation of orders in the Seminole War of 1818, [which served] as a convenient pretext for a formal break with his lieutenant."

The elaborate lie concocted beginning in 1827 and told by Jackson in 1831 was that Representative Rhea had in fact "written him a letter conveying Monroe's authorization to seize Florida" in response to the January 1818 letter by Jackson; Jackson supposedly received the "Rhea letter" authorization in mid-February 1818, on his march towards Fort Scott in Florida. And then, in Jackson's telling, on April 12, 1819—during the Congressional investigation—Jackson allegedly burned said "Rhea letter," the letter in which Monroe supposedly issued orders approving the invasion; and someone left a note in Jackson's letterbook copy of the January 1818 letter that the reply had been burned, but "the notation on the copy is not in Jackson's hand." To top all that off, "so far from knowing of any authorization for Jackson's seizure of Florida, Rhea had written Jackson on December 18, 1818, after reading such documents on the Seminole War as were published: 'I will for one support your conduct, believing as far as I have read that you have acted for [the] public good.'"

Historians examining Jackson's preserved correspondence found that the Johnny Rhea letter addressed to James Monroe during the Cabinet crisis of 1830–31 was written at the behest of Jackson with specific instructions about what to say, and with Rhea seemingly happily volunteering to lie ("As you are on the defensive I will help you all I can") and asking "Jackson to send him the necessary documents so that he could 'refresh' his mind and give Jackson a helpful 'recollection.'" Rhea, for whatever reason—the motive and true nature of their relationship are seemingly lost to history—was willing to do his part to endorse Jackson's lies. Per historian Richard R. Stenberg, Jackson further "openly confessed" his imperial intent, enacted on his own whim, in his "Exposition against Calhoun" statement of 1831. Stenberg argued that Jackson's 1831 narrative was "so completely at variance with the facts, and so circumstantially narrated" that intentional misrepresentation and falsehood—"pure, deliberate fiction"—is the only reasonable explanation. (Note: Stenberg is remembered for consistently attacking what was then consensus view of history—represented in his time by figures including John S. Bassett and Eugene Barker—and he "particularly assaulted the reputations of Andrew Jackson, James K. Polk and Sam Houston." As part of Stenberg's "debunking" set-the-record-straight style, he was in the habit of "ignoring any other possible interpretation of his evidence, unless he use[d] it to show how wrong it was.") Having been outmaneuvered by Jackson's courtiers and fallen into permanent disfavor with the president, John C. Calhoun resigned the vice presidency on December 27, 1832. The office of the vice president remained unfilled until the March 4, 1833 inauguration of Martin Van Buren as veep.

== Second Rhea letter, and "Denunciation of the Insinuations of John Rhea" ==
Thus it came to be that, in the middle of the anti-Calhoun intrigues of Jackson's courtiers in 1831 and Calhoun's ultimately fruitless attempts to defend himself, former Congressman John Rhea wrote to former President Monroe at the behest of Jackson. Schouler, writing in 1884, described this letter as conveying violence in its very appearance: "Even to this day, that letter, deliberately composed and appearing to have been carefully copied out, bristles with hate and defiance, every line resembling a row of rattlesnakes." This letter demanded that Monroe admit to having written Jackson with permission to invade by using Rhea as his amanuensis. Schouler, channeling Jackson biographer James Parton, commented, "Is it not singular that, while we are told that Rhea's letter to Jackson was burnt, neither Rhea nor Jackson has pretended to state what was its substance, what the dates of Rhea's interview with Monroe, what the terms of the supposed authority, or any other details?" The editors of The Papers of Andrew Jackson comment, "The case for the existence of a Rhea document relies ultimately on Jackson's credibility. The corroborating testimony he obtained from John Overton, and from a nearly senile, and obviously eager-to-please, Rhea, was weak, and he apparently did not seek or obtain support from former military associates who might have seen Rhea's letter."

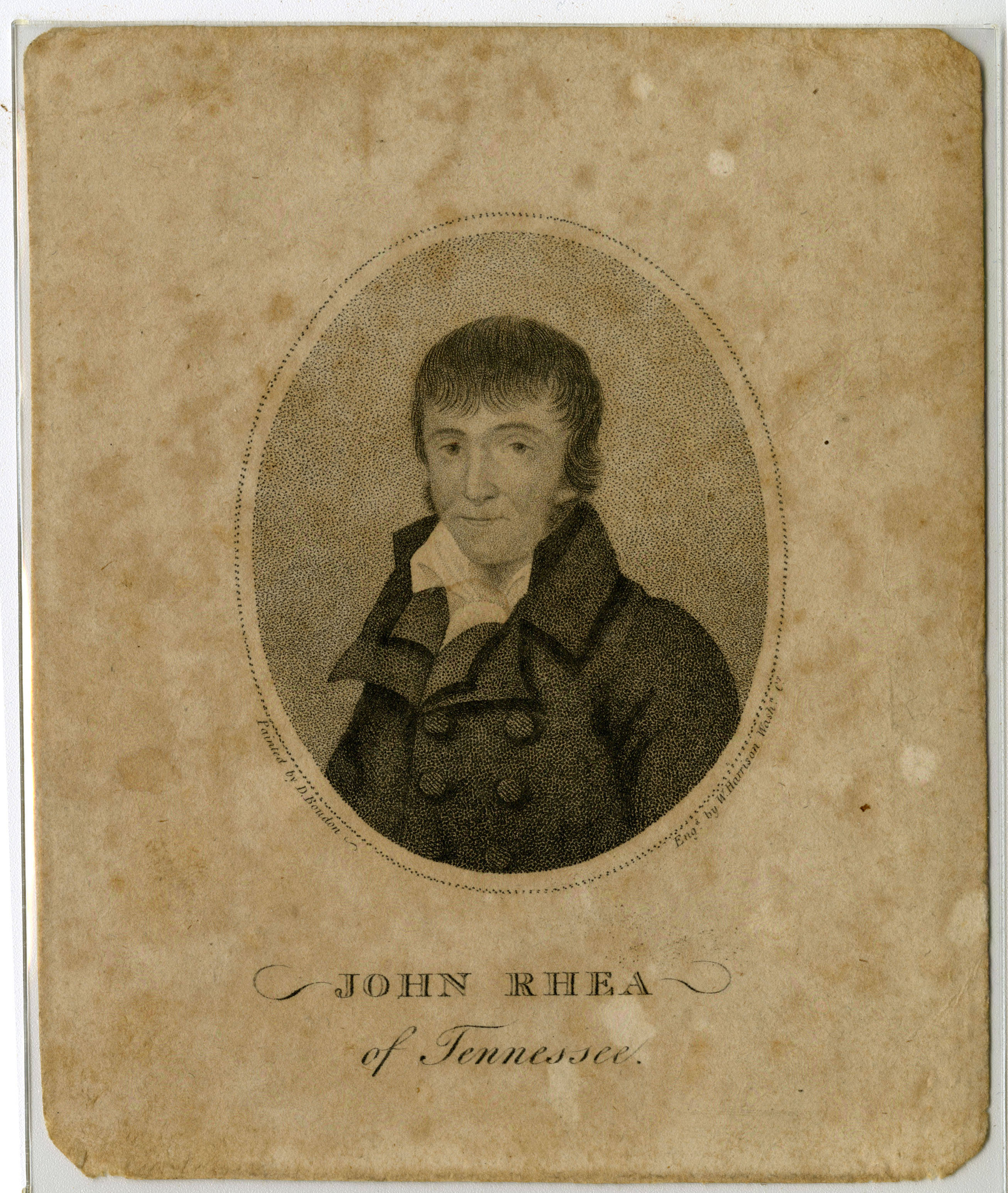
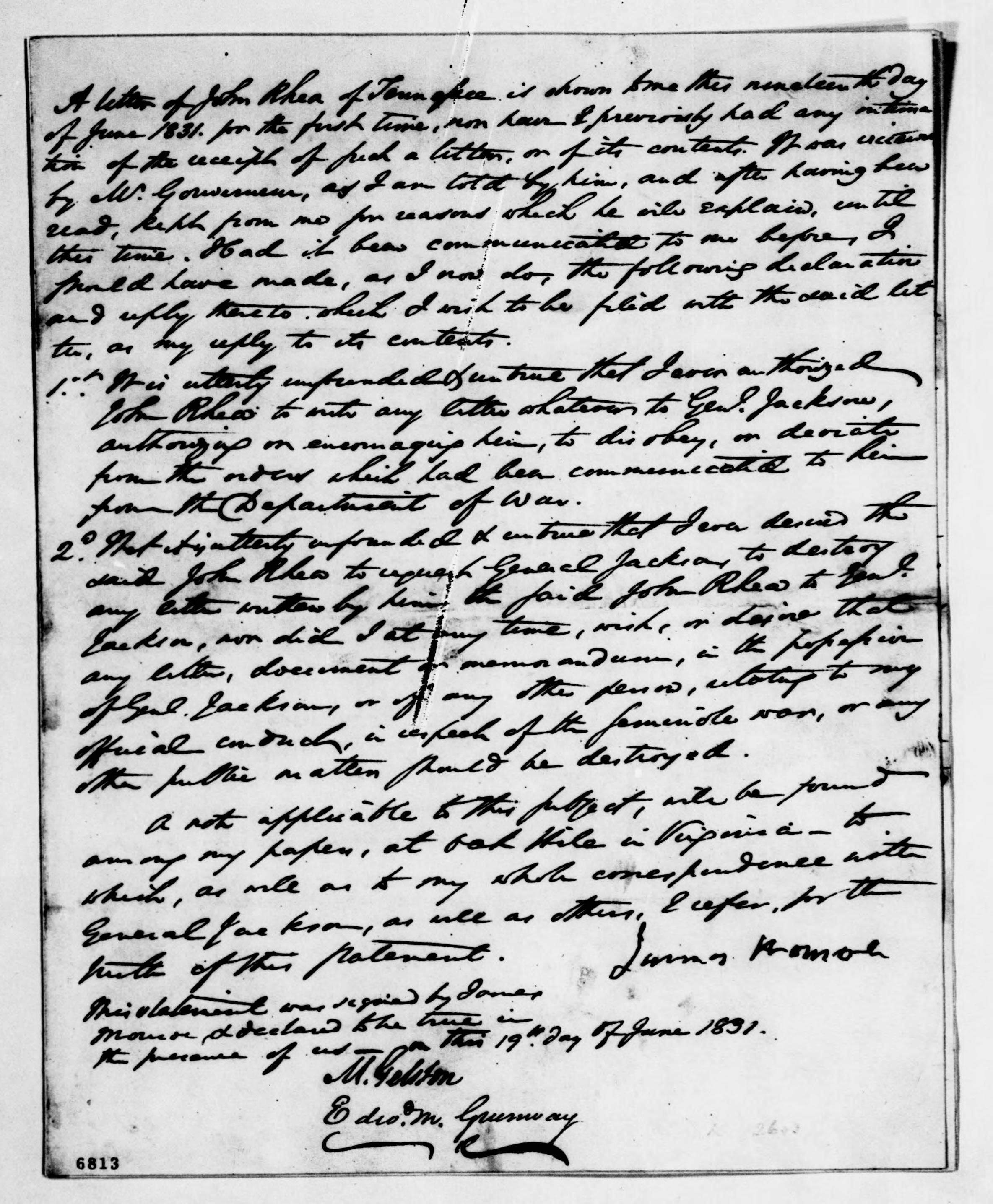
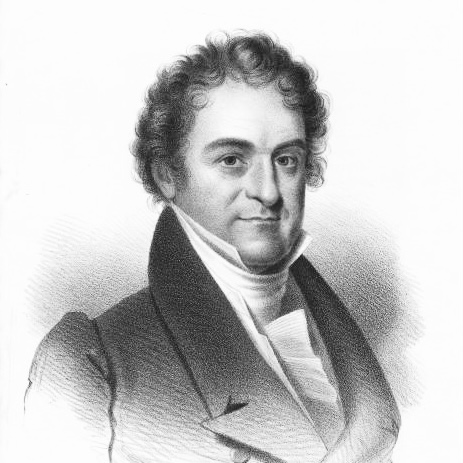
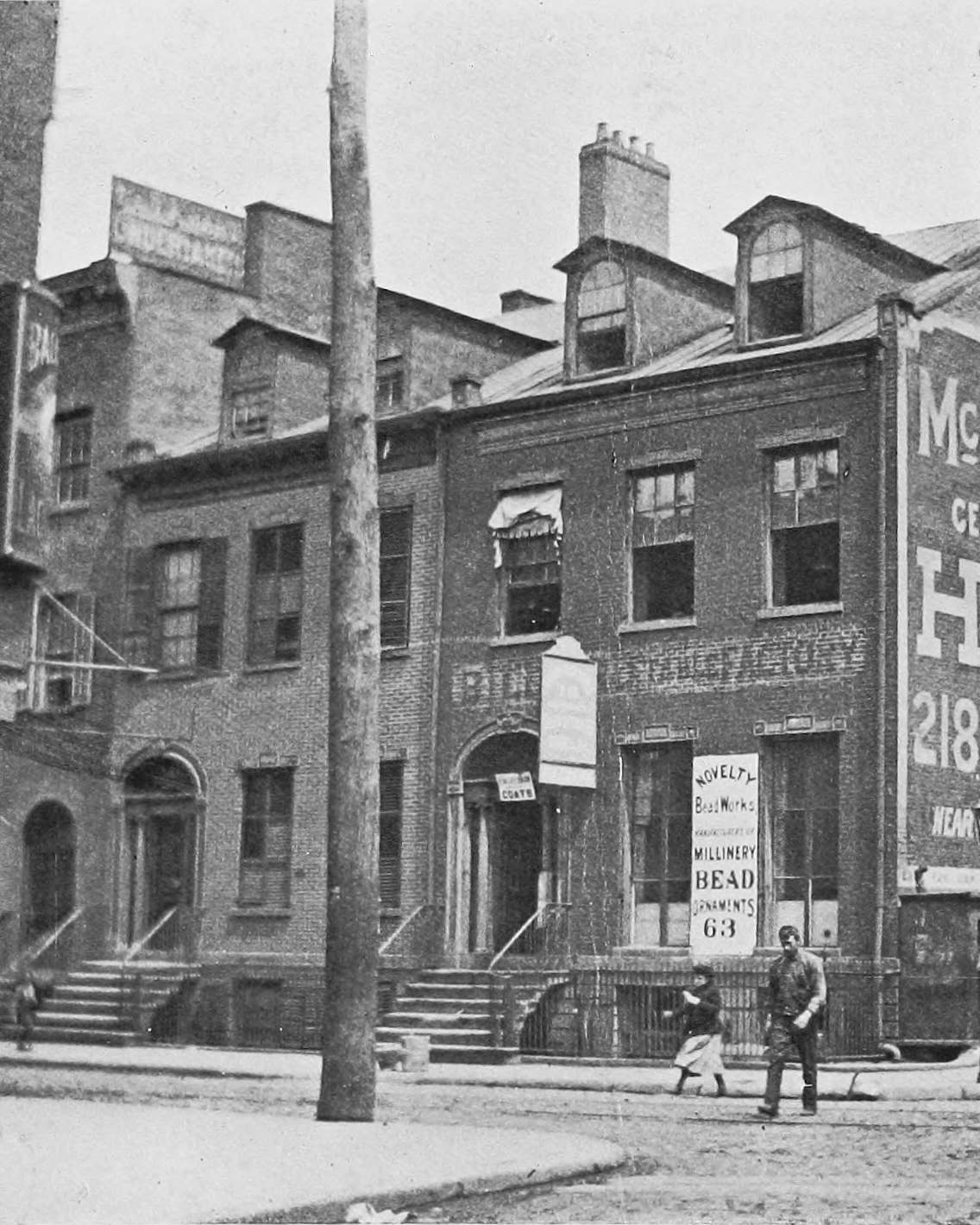
He was called "John Rhea of Tennessee" to distinguish him from "John Rea of Pennsylvania," who served in many of the same Congresses; "Denunciation of the Insinuations of John Rhea" was the last document Monroe ever signed, on June 19, 1831; William Wirt served as Attorney General of the United States for 12 years; Monroe died on July 4, 1831, at the New York City home of his daughter Maria and her husband Samuel L. Gouverneur (building photographed in 1891)

James Monroe was in his final illness when he received the letter from John Rhea, and thus one of the final acts of his life was dictating, and having witnessed and notarized, a statement denying all of Rhea's claims, which were in fact Jackson's claims. Monroe's son-in-law Samuel L. Gouverneur and William Wirt, U.S. Attorney General from 1817 to 1829, made it known that this document existed and they preserved it carefully, just in case Jackson should ever attempt to lay the blame at Monroe's feet. Monroe had previously been publicly supportive while privately firm but gentle with Jackson, and he was said to have been shocked and distressed at Rhea's falsehoods; the document he dictated and signed in response is known as "Denunciation of the Insinuations of John Rhea."

The only possible defense for the legality and legitimacy of Jackson's invasion comes from his claim that Monroe issued a secret order to him (through Rhea). Jackson scaffolded a second set of lies on top of this first falsehood: because of the secrecy of the secret order, all evidence was supposed to be obscured and destroyed and hidden from everyone in government and the military except for Jackson and Monroe. The editors of The Papers therefore state that the "existence or non-existence of Rhea's letter can probably never be established with certainty." American historian Daniel Walker Howe has compared the behavior pattern in the construction of the "Rhea letter" fiction to the elaborate construction in 1828 of a false timeline (along with the recruitment of cronies to swear to Jackson's version) that plausibly excused his legally adulterous/bigamous marriage situation of 1789 to 1793. In both cases, lawyer Jackson knew enough about the requirements for proving a case that he benefited from the evidence of absence problem, or rather the impossibility of proving the negative ("the secret letter definitely did not exist," "the Natchez marriage definitely did not happen"), or as historian Feller put it, the whole trap was laid from the beginning with "no paper trail, no smoking gun."

== Influence ==
Virtually everyone in American government wanted Florida, and "in a way the mystery over whether Monroe did or did not unleash Jackson through John Rhea misses the real issue. The real issue is that Jackson thought he could, and that Monroe did not correct him." Congressional legislators also declined to penalize Jackson for his actions. Jackson's will to power and his "argument," through force of arms, that it was impossible for European powers to retain control of North American provinces was debated throughout 1818 and 1819 but the discussion, argues historian Deborah A. Rosen, "would conclude with a resounding victory for the slate of ideas that justified the Florida expeditions. The consequences for 19th-century American history were enormous." In addition to its impact on the practice of American imperialism, the long tail of Jackson's Seminole War scheme and the legacy of the non-existent "Rhea letter" set the stage for the anti-Calhoun putsch that pushed him out of the Jackson administration, and Calhoun's exile was the precipitating event that led him to create and publicize his states' rights and nullification political theory urtext, which was in turn a major first domino in a domino-run chain of events that led to disunion in 1860–61.

In his journal entries of 1831, John Quincy Adams characterized Jackson's construction of the Rhea letter fraud and his derivative attacks on the reputations of Calhoun and Monroe as evidence of the depths of Jackson's depravity.

"Representing the interests of the plantation south and the southern and western frontier more than those of the United States as a whole, Jackson and many of his officers (regardless of their place of birth) were fundamentally sectional agents rather than truly national ones: national security meant southern security, first and foremost."

— Samuel J. Watson, Jackson's Sword (2012)

== See also ==
- Natchez Expedition (1813)
- Battle of Pensacola (1814)
- James Wilkinson § War of 1812 and capture of Fort Charlotte, Mobile
- Salt Lick Reservation controversy
- Bibliography of Andrew Jackson
- Presidency of James Monroe § Foreign affairs
- Andrew Jackson and the slave trade
- Andrew Jackson and land speculation
- 15th United States Congress
- 16th United States Congress

== Sources ==
- Anderson, Nicholas D. (2025). "Inadvertent Expansion in the American South: The United States". Inadvertent Expansion: How Peripheral Agents Shape World Politics. Ithaca: Cornell University Press. pp. 47–69. doi:10.1353/book.126582. ISBN 9781501779480. OCLC 1446551436.
- Capers, Gerald M. (February 1948). "A Reconsideration of John C. Calhoun's Transition from Nationalism to Nullification". The Journal of Southern History. 14 (1): 34–48. doi:10.2307/2197709. ISSN 0022-4642. JSTOR 2197709.
- Feller, Daniel (Winter 2010). "The Seminole Controversy Revisited: A New Look at Andrew Jackson's 1818 Florida Campaign". The Florida Historical Quarterly (2009 Catherine Prescott Lecture). 88 (3): 309–325. ISSN 0015-4113. JSTOR 20700296.
- Heidler, Jeanne T.; Heidler, David S. (2010). "Mr. Rhea's Missing Letter and the First Seminole War". In Belko, William S. (ed.). America's Hundred Years' War: U.S. Expansion to the Gulf Coast and the Fate of the Seminole, 1763–1858. Gainesville, Florida: University Press of Florida. pp. 103–124. doi:10.5744/florida/9780813035253.003.0005. ISBN 978-0-8130-4514-6. LCCN 2010024271. OCLC 801840927. Project MUSE book 19493.
- Howe, Daniel Walker (2007). What Hath God Wrought: The Transformation of America, 1815–1848. The Oxford History of the United States. New York City: Oxford University Press. ISBN 978-0-1950-7894-7. LCCN 2007012370. OCLC 122701433.
- Maiden, Leota Driver (1958). "Colonel John Williams". East Tennessee Historical Society's Publications. 30. Tennessee Historical Commission, University of Tennessee. Knoxville, Tennessee: East Tennessee Historical Society: 7–46. ISSN 0361-6193. OCLC 1137265. FHL 1345572.
- Miles, Edwin A. (1968). "The Whig Party and the Menace of Caesar". Tennessee Historical Quarterly. 27 (4): 361–379. ISSN 0040-3261.
- Morgan, George (1921). The Life of James Monroe. Boston: Small, Maynard and Company. pp. 442–452. ISBN 978-0-404-00594-8
- Mueller, Ken (2014). Senator Benton and the People: Master Race Democracy on the Early American Frontier. Early American Places. Ithaca, New York: Cornell University Press. ISBN 9781501757556. OCLC 1203952026. Project MUSE book 83601.
- Odom, E. Dale (1970). "A 1934 Attack on Mainstream History and the Establishment". Social Science Quarterly. 50 (4): 941–943. ISSN 0038-4941. JSTOR 42861283.
- Porter, Kenneth W. (1971). The Negro on the American Frontier. The American Negro, His History and Literature. New York: Arno Press. ISBN 978-0-405-01983-8. LCCN 77135872. OCLC 153515.
- Rosen, Deborah A. (2015). Border Law: The First Seminole War and American Nationhood. Harvard University Press. doi:10.4159/9780674425699. ISBN 978-0-674-42569-9. LCCN 2014030726. OCLC 906025995.
- Schouler, James (1896). "Monroe and the Rhea Letter". Historical Briefs. New York: Dodd, Mead, and Company. hdl:loc.gdc/scd0001.00114169651. LCCN 04016614. OCLC 1492064. OL 7033424M. (originally published as ——— (October 1884). "Monroe and the Rhea Letter". The Magazine of American History. Vol. XII, no. 4. New York: A. S. Barnes. pp. 308–322. ISSN 0361-6185. OCLC 1590082.)
- Stenberg, Richard R. (November 1936). "Jackson's "Rhea Letter" Hoax". The Journal of Southern History. 2 (4). Rice University. Southern Historical Association: 480–496. doi:10.2307/2192034. ISSN 0022-4642. JSTOR 2192034.
- Various; Jackson, Andrew (1927). Bassett, John Spencer (ed.). Correspondence of Andrew Jackson, Volume II, 1814–1819. Carnegie Papers No. 371, Vol. II – via HathiTrust.
- Various; Jackson, Andrew (1994). Moser, Harold D.; Hoth, David R.; Hoemann, George H. (eds.). The Papers of Andrew Jackson, Volume IV, 1816–1820. University of Tennessee Press. ISBN 978-0-8704-9219-8.
- Various; Monroe, James (1903). Hamilton, Stanislaus Murray (ed.). The Writings of James Monroe, Volume VII, 1824–1831. New York: G.P. Putnam's Sons. LCCN 2021771964. OCLC 435985988.
- Watson, Samuel J. (2012). Jackson's Sword: The Army Officer Corps on the American Frontier, 1810–1821. Modern War Studies. Lawrence: University Press of Kansas. ISBN 978-0-7006-1884-2. LCCN 2012027879. OCLC 788282695.
