= Eric Etheridge =

American journalist and photographer

- Education: Vanderbilt University
- Occupations: journalist, editor

Eric J. Etheridge is an American journalist and photographer who was the initial editor, in 1995, of George, the magazine co-founded by John F. Kennedy Jr.

== Life ==
Etheridge is a native of Mississippi. Etheridge is a 1979 graduate of Vanderbilt University. He documented victims of gun violence in the Bronx.

In July 2006, The New York Times Magazine published a selection of his then-and-now photos of individuals who had taken part in the Freedom Rides of 1961. Etheridge had found mug shots of the arrested Riders in the files of the Mississippi State Sovereignty Commission, and he photographed a number of the former Riders whom he was able to track down. In 2008, that material served as the basis for his book Breach of Peace: Portraits of the 1961 Mississippi Freedom Riders. His portrait of Freedom Rider Charles Sellers accompanied the latter's New York Times obituary.

== Works ==
- Breach of Peace: Portraits of the 1961 Mississippi Freedom Riders, Vanderbilt University Press, 2018. ISBN 9780826521903
