= Rheatown, Tennessee =

Unincorporated community in Tennessee, US

Coordinates: 36.231°N 82.695°W

Rheatown is an unincorporated community in eastern Greene County, Tennessee just north of Chuckey.

== History ==
Rheatown was said to be one the oldest communities in Greene County, its first settlers having arrived in the early 1780s. It was located along the old stage road between Jonesborough and Greeneville (one of the main roads passing through the community today still bears the name "Old Stage Road"). By the 1820s, it had a post office and several businesses, and had been named in honor of Congressman John Rhea. It was incorporated as a town in 1856, however it is now unincorporated.

== Postal service ==
Rheatown had a post office from 1823 until an unknown time. However it does not currently have its own post office or zip code. Chuckey's zip code (37641) and post office serves Rheatown.
