= Richard R. Stenberg =

American historian (b. 1910)

Richard R. Stenberg (b. c. 1910) was an American historian. During the 1930s and early 1940s he wrote several influential papers on the U.S. politics and events of the second quarter of the 19th century, sometimes known as the Jacksonian era. He also worked as regional administrator of Federal One's Historical Records Survey. He then largely disappeared from the public record himself, apparently having been confined to a hospital in Washington, D.C.

== Life and work ==
Stenberg was born around 1910 in Nebraska. He graduated Phi Beta Kappa from the University of Texas with a major in history and a minor in government. He did his master's degree and his doctorate at the University of Texas. In 1934 he was hired to teach European history at the University of Arkansas. He was a regional director, based in San Antonio, of the New Deal-era Historical Records Survey, serving from inception until August 1936. At the time of his son's birth in 1937, he reported to the registrar that he had worked as a teacher at the University of Texas for the past four years. In 1939 he was assistant editor of the HRS's Federal Archives Inventories.

Stenberg is remembered for consistently attacking what was then consensus view of history—represented in his time by figures including John S. Bassett and Eugene Barker—and he "particularly assaulted the reputations of Andrew Jackson, James K. Polk and Sam Houston." As part of Stenberg's "debunking" set-the-record-straight style, he was in the habit of "ignoring any other possible interpretation of his evidence, unless he use[d] it to show how wrong it was." In 1958, Charles G. Sellers described him "Jackson's most inveterate scholarly foe in the twentieth century." Stenberg intended to produce a book called The Insidious Andrew Jackson, which was never published, but nonetheless "Stenberg's point of view gained some currency through a series of articles." Jackson's research on the relationship between Sam Houston and Jackson and American expansionism into Texas was considered almost transgressive to some in the 1930s but by the 1970s the work was deemed "brilliant" and "endlessly cited." Edward Pessen both recommended Stenberg's Jackson-critical articles and called them "studies in vitriol." Donald Ratliffe wrote in his 2015 history of the 1824 U.S. presidential election that "One does not have to accept Richard R. Stenberg's character assassination of Jackson in his 'Jackson, Buchanan, and the Corrupt Bargain Calumny'...to appreciate his demonstration of the thinness of the evidence for the 'bargain and corruption' charge."

== Personal life ==
His father taught at Culver Academy in Indiana in 1910. His wife seems to have filed for divorce in San Antonio in 1938. Stenberg, his wife, and their two year old son were resident in Washington, D.C. in 1940, with Stenberg employed as a teacher college. Stenberg was an inmate of St. Elizabeth's Asylum in Washington, D.C. at the time of the 1950 U.S. census.

== Selected publications ==
- Stenberg, Richard R. (1932). "The Motivation of the Wilmot Proviso". The Mississippi Valley Historical Review. 18 (4): 535–548. doi:10.2307/1898562. ISSN 0161-391X. JSTOR 1898562.
- Stenberg, Richard R. (1932). "Jackson, Anthony Butler, and Texas". The Southwestern Social Science Quarterly. 13 (3): 264–286. ISSN 0276-1742. JSTOR 42864814.
- Stenberg, Richard R. (1933). "An Unnoted Factor in the Buchanan–Douglas Feud". Journal of the Illinois State Historical Society. 25 (4): 271–284. ISSN 0019-2287. JSTOR 40188819.
- Stenberg, Richard R. (March 1933). "Some Political Aspects of the Dred Scott Case". The Mississippi Valley Historical Review. 19 (4): 571–577. doi:10.2307/1897809. JSTOR 1897809.
- Stenberg, Richard R. (1934). "Jackson, Buchanan, and the "Corrupt Bargain" Calumny". The Pennsylvania Magazine of History and Biography. 58 (1): 61–85. ISSN 0031-4587. JSTOR 20086857.
- Stenberg, Richard R. (1934). "The Texas Schemes of Jackson and Houston, 1829–1836". The Southwestern Social Science Quarterly. 15 (3): 229–250. ISSN 0276-1742. JSTOR 42879202.
- Stenberg, Richard R. (February 1934). "The Boundaries of the Louisiana Purchase". The Hispanic American Historical Review. 14 (1): 32–64. doi:10.2307/2506137. JSTOR 2506137.
- Stenberg, Richard R. (1934). "President Polk and the Annexation of Texas". The Southwestern Social Science Quarterly. 14 (4): 333–356. ISSN 0276-1742. JSTOR 42864918.
- Stenberg, Richard R. (1935). "The Failure of Polk's Mexican War Intrigue of 1845". Pacific Historical Review. 4 (1): 39–68. doi:10.2307/3633243. ISSN 0030-8684. JSTOR 3633243.
- Stenberg, R. R. (1936). "J. Q. Adams: Imperialist and Apostate". The Southwestern Social Science Quarterly. 16 (4): 37–49. ISSN 0276-1742. JSTOR 42879288.
- Stenberg, Richard R. (April 1936). "Jackson's Neches Claim, 1829–1836". The Southwestern Historical Quarterly. 39 (4): 255–274. ISSN 0038-478X. JSTOR 30235583.
- Stenberg, Richard R. (November 1936). "Jackson's "Rhea Letter" Hoax". The Journal of Southern History. 2 (4): 480–496. doi:10.2307/2192034. ISSN 0022-4642. JSTOR 2192034.
- Stenberg, Richard R. (1937). "President Jackson and Anthony Butler". Southwest Review. 22 (4): 391–404. ISSN 0038-4712. JSTOR 43466385.
- Stenberg, R. R. (1937). "Andrew Jackson and the Erving Affidavit". The Southwestern Historical Quarterly. 41 (2): 142–153. ISSN 0038-478X. JSTOR 30235759.
- Stenberg, Richard R. (1938). "Polk and Frémont, 1845–1846". Pacific Historical Review. 7 (3): 211–227. doi:10.2307/3634003. ISSN 0030-8684. JSTOR 3634003.
- Stenberg, Richard R. (August 1938). "The Jefferson Birthday Dinner, 1830". The Journal of Southern History. 4 (3): 334–345. doi:10.2307/2191293. JSTOR 2191293.
- Stenberg, Richard R.; Stockton, R. F. (1939). "Intrigue for Annexation". Southwest Review. 25 (1): 58–69. ISSN 0038-4712. JSTOR 43466507.
- Stenberg, Richard R. (October 1939). "A Note on the Jackson-Calhoun Breach of 1830–31". Tyler's Quarterly Historical and Genealogical Magazine. XXI (65). Holderoft, Va.: 6–9.
- Stenberg, Richard R. (March 1941). "Some Letters of the Texas Revolution". The Southwestern Social Science Quarterly. 21 (4): 302–311. ISSN 0276-1742. JSTOR 42865009.

== See also ==
- James Parton
- Arthur M. Schlesinger Jr.
- Robert V. Remini § Andrew Jackson
