= Market Revolution =

19th-century economic revolution in the United States

The Market Revolution in the 19th century United States is a historical model that describes how the United States became a modern market-based economy. During the mid-19th century, technological innovation allowed for increased output, demographic expansion and access to global factor markets for labor, goods and capital.

The term was widely popularized by Charles Grier Sellers (1923–2021), a leading historian of the Jacksonian period. His book, The Market Revolution: Jacksonian America, 1815-1846 portrayed it as a highly negative development that marked the triumph of capitalism over democracy. He argued that this was one of the most significant transformations of America within the first half of the nineteenth century—indeed, the defining event of world history—the evolution from an agrarian to a capitalist society. Sellers observed:

While dissolving deeply rooted patterns of behavior and belief for competitive effort, it mobilized collective resources through government to fuel growth in countless ways, not least by providing the essential legal, financial, and transport infrastructures. Establishing capitalist hegemony over economy, politics, and culture, the market revolution created ourselves and most of the world we know.

== Process ==
According to Sellers, traditional commerce was made obsolete by improvements in transportation and communication. This change prompted the reinstatement of the mercantilist ideas that were thought to have died out. Increased industrialization was a major component of the Market Revolution as a result of the Industrial Revolution. Northern cities started to have a more powerful economy, while most southern cities (with the marked exception of free labor metropolises like St. Louis, Baltimore, and New Orleans) resisted the influence of market forces in favor of the region's slave system. It also was in part influenced by the need for national mobility, shown to be a problem during the War of 1812, after which the government increased production of early roads, extensive canals along navigable waterways, and later elaborate railroad networks.

Following the War of 1812, argues Sellers, the American economy was altered from an economy dependent on imports from Europe to one that evolved greater internal production and commerce. In 1817 James Monroe replaced James Madison as president of the U.S. The Democratic-Republicans continued policies begun in Hamiltons's administration. With a new generation of leaders, the Democratic-Republican Party came to embrace the principles of government activism and the development of large-scale domestic manufacturing. Despite all of the promises that characterized the United States, discrepancies loomed: the survival of slavery, treatment of the Native Americans, the deterioration of some urban areas, and a mania for speculation. The nation was not just growing through the addition of land, but population shifts brought about new states to the Union and when Missouri petitioned for statehood in 1819, the issue of slavery was thrust on the national agenda. Thomas Jefferson wrote that the issue awakened him "like a fire bell in the night." That the Missouri question coincided with the nation's worst financial crisis awakened anxieties in many Americans. By the 1820s Americans recognized a rough regional specialization: plantation-style export agriculture in the south, a north built on business and trade, and a frontier west. The regions were interdependent but in time their differences would become more obvious, more important, and increasingly more incompatible.

The market revolution, according to Sellers, also brought about a change in industry and agriculture. Eli Whitney perfected a system of producing muskets with interchangeable parts. Prior to Whitney's invention, most muskets—and all other goods—had been handmade with parts specially designed for each particular musket. The trigger of one musket, for example, could not be used to replace a broken trigger on another musket. With interchangeable parts, however, all triggers fit the same model of the musket, as did all ramrods, all flash pans, all hammers, and all bullets. Manufacturers in many different industries soon took advantage of Whitney's invention to make a variety of goods with interchangeable parts.

Many new products revolutionized agriculture in the West. John Deere, for example, invented the horse-pulled steel plow to replace the difficult oxen-driven wooden plows that farmers had used for centuries. The steel plow allowed farmers to till soil faster and more cheaply without having to make repairs as often.

In the 1830s, Cyrus McCormick invented a mechanical mower-reaper that quintupled the efficiency of wheat farming. Prior to the mower-reaper, wheat farming had been too difficult, so farmers had instead produced corn, which was less profitable. As in the South after the cotton gin, farmers in the West raked in huge profits as they acquired more lands to plant more and more wheat. More important, farmers for the first time began producing more wheat than the West could consume. Rather than let it go to waste, they began to transport crop surpluses to sell in the manufacturing Northeast.

The market revolution further exacerbated sectional tensions in the United States. As King Cotton became the primary crop in the South, the need for increase in labor arose; thus, the South increased its use of slaves in producing crops. The American North and Western European countries banned slavery in their countries/regions, and attempted to push the South to abolish slavery as well. The slave trade ended, but slavery did not end. As the textile industry in the North drastically increased, changing women and children's roles and further revolutionizing family structure, the demand for raw products such as cotton increased, meaning an increase in the South's demand for more labor. Ironically, this Northern demand for more cotton for the textile industry increased the Southern demand for slavery, making it harder for the North to end slavery in the South. This increase of labor and industry brought the United States into the world picture for economy and commerce, planting the seed for the United States to increase in wealth and power majority of the time.

== Historiography ==
Sellers argued:

By the 1830s and 1840s, trade and specialization among the four port/hinterland regions were creating an integrated sectional market embracing the northeast as a whole. Meanwhile, commercial agriculture spread over the west and the south; and during the second half of the nineteenth century, the northeast market reached out to incorporate these sections into an integrated national market. By midcentury, capital and technology were converting enough central workshops into mechanized factories to convert the market revolution into a staggeringly productive industrial revolution.

Sellers has explained his motivation for this interpretation:

As both citizen and historian, I took alarm when consensus historians armed the United States for Cold War by purging class from consciousness. Muffling exploitative capital in appealing democratic garb, their mythology of consensual democratic capitalism purged egalitarian meaning from democracy. I winced when Ronald Reagan evoked "democracy" against the Evil Empire though clearly meaning capitalism. I grieved when public discourse translated democracy into "freedom" ("liberty" in the academic mode)—typically meaning freedom to aggrandize yourself without any concern for people who lack the gumption, social advantages, or luck to do the same.

Professor John Lauritz Larson has considered these transformations in his book, The Market Revolution in America: Liberty, Ambition, and the Eclipse of the Common Good.

At the end of its war for independence, the United States comprised thirteen separate provinces on the coast of North America. Nearly all of 3.9 million people made their living through agriculture while a small merchant class traded tobacco, timber, and foodstuffs for tropical goods, useful manufactures, and luxuries in the Atlantic community. By the time of the civil war, eight decades later, the United States sprawled across the North American continent. Nearly 32 million people labored not just on farms, but in shops and factories making iron and steel products, boots and shoes, textiles, paper, packaged foodstuffs, firearms, farm machinery, furniture, tools, and all sorts of housewares. Civil War-era Americans borrowed money from banks; bought insurance against fire, theft, shipwreck, commercial losses, and even premature death; traveled on steamboats and in railway carriages; and produced 2 to 3 billion of goods and services, including exports of 400 million. this dramatic transformation is what some historians of the U.S. call the market revolution.

Historian Daniel Walker Howe challenges the Sellers' interpretation. First, Howe points out that the market revolution happened much earlier, in the eighteenth century. Second, Howe thinks Sellers errs in emphasis arguing that because "most American family farmers welcomed the chance to buy and sell in larger markets", no one was mourning the end of traditionalism and regretting the rise of modernity. The market revolution improved standards of living for most American farmers. For example, a mattress that cost fifty dollars in 1815 (which meant that almost no one owned one) cost five in 1848 (and everyone slept better). Finally, retorts Howe, the revolution that really mattered was the "communications revolution": the invention of the telegraph, the expansion of the postal system, improvements in printing technology, and the growth of the newspaper, magazine, and book-publishing industries, and the improvements in higher-speed transportation.

In his debate with Sellers, Howe asks, "What if people really were benefiting in certain ways from the expansion of the market and its culture? What if they espoused middle-class tastes or evangelical religion or (even) Whig politics for rational and defensible reasons? What if the market was not an actor (as Sellers makes it) but a resource, an instrumentality, something created by human beings as a means to their ends?" However, Sellers sums up the differences between his and Howe's arguments this way. Howe was proposing that the "Market delivers eager self-improvers from stifling Jacksonian barbarism" whereas he saw that a "Go-getter minority compels everybody else to play its competitive game of speedup and stretch-out or be run over."

Howe has praised Larson's approach for rejecting Sellers' "villain":

Larson here redeems the term "market revolution" from the treatment accorded it by Charles Sellers ... Sellers reified the market revolution, making it an actor in his story—indeed, its villain. Sellers's wicked "Market" ruined the lives of happy subsistence farmers, forcing their sons and daughters to become a proletariat in the service of a repressive bourgeoisie. By contrast, Larson shows how the market revolution was made by the people themselves, bit by unwitting bit. His own stance toward this process is richly ironic and nuanced; he never fails to point out ambiguities and paradoxes.
