= Breach of Peace (book) =

Book by Eric Etheridge

Breach of Peace: Portraits of the 1961 Mississippi Freedom Riders
- Book cover
- Author: Eric Etheridge
- Publisher: Atlas & Co.
- Publication date: 2008
- ISBN: 9780977743391
- OCLC: 191245899

Breach of Peace: Portraits of the 1961 Mississippi Freedom Riders is a 2008 book by Eric Etheridge. The book features the life stories of over 80 of the Freedom Riders who fought to desegregate interstate bus transportation in the Deep South, and includes both their original mug shots and contemporary photographic portraits taken 45 or more years later by Etheridge. The mug shots had been stored for decades by the Mississippi State Sovereignty Commission, a state "government agency formed in 1956 to oppose the Civil Rights Movement and the federal government". The preface was written by Roger Wilkins and the foreword by Diane McWhorter.

== Subjects ==
Notable Freedom Riders among the over 80 profiled in the book include James Bevel, C.T. Vivian, John Lewis, Carol Ruth Silver, Michael Audain, Bob Filner, Wyatt Tee Walker, Charles Grier Sellers, Byron Baer, Bernard Lafayette, Helen Singleton, and John Gager.

== Critical reception ==
Reviewing for The New Yorker, Hendrik Hertzberg called it a "marvelous, moving book". Hertzberg described the mug shots as "a remarkable exercise in folk portraiture" and called Etheridge's follow-up portraits "terrific". A reviewer in the Los Angeles Times wrote that the emotions and values of the Freedom Riders are reflected in the mug shots: "Vividly rendered on those young faces -- excited, angry, naive, fearful, idealistic". The Smithsonian Magazine's reviewer called the book a "visceral tribute to those road warriors". A reviewer for The New York Times called the portrayal of individual activists "mesmerizing time capsules". A reviewer for The New York Observer said that the book serves as "something of a closing meditation on the five decades of stirring progress" that led to the 2008 presidential candidacies of Barack Obama and Hillary Clinton.
