= The Magazine of American History =

American magazine

- Frequency: Monthly
- First issue: January 1877
- Final issue: 1917
- Company: A. S. Barnes Company
- Country: United States
- ISSN: 0361-6185

The Magazine of American History was established in January 1877 by Martha Joanna Lamb, Nathan Gillett Pond and John Austin Stevens with the long title The Magazine of American History with Notes and Queries. It was issued monthly. The first seven volumes were published by the A. S. Barnes Company of New York and Chicago, volumes 8 through 28 by the Historical Publication Co., and, after Mrs. Lamb's death, the final two volumes of the initial series by the Magazine of American History Company. It lasted into its 30th volume; the last of the three numbers in that volume was issued in September 1893. In addition to scholarly articles, and answers to readers' queries it also included original documents such as the letters of George Washington, and diary extracts from various Revolutionary War figures.

In 1901 a continuation using the shorter title was begun in Mount Vernon, NY with the middle of the 30th volume. It lasted through the 46th volume in 1917.

== Listing ==
- Magazine of American History. N.Y. etc., 1877-93. Revived, Mt. Vernon, N.Y., 1901-17.
  - General index through 1893.
- Magazine of History. N.Y. etc., 1905-22. "Extra Numbers,” 1908-35.
  - General indexes to Magazine, 1912, 1919;
  - to "Extra Numbers,” 1919, 1924, 1928.

== Notes ==
- various issues of the magazine itself
- Union List of Serials, 3rd edition, 1965, vol. 3
