= James Schouler =

American lawyer and historian (1839–1920)

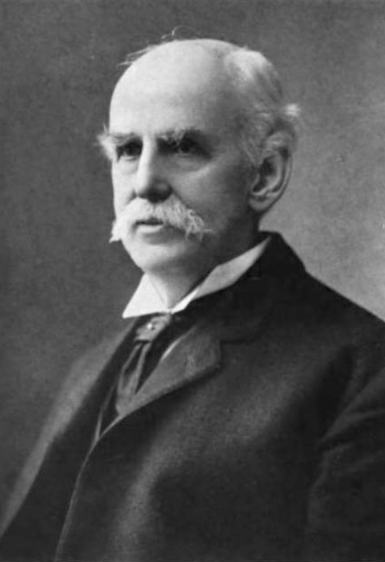
- Born: March 20, 1839; West Cambridge, Massachusetts
- Died: April 16, 1920 (aged 81); Intervale, New Hampshire
- Education: Harvard University
- Occupations: Lawyer, historian
- Notable work: History of the United States under the Constitution, 1789–1865
- Father: William Schouler

James Schouler (March 20, 1839 – April 16, 1920) was an American lawyer and historian best known for his historical work History of the United States under the Constitution, 1789–1865.

== Biography ==
Schouler was born in West Cambridge (now Arlington), Massachusetts. He was the son of William Schouler, who from 1847 to 1853 edited the Boston Atlas, one of the leading Whig journals of New England. He graduated at Harvard in 1859, after which he taught for a year at St. Paul's School. He studied law in Boston and was admitted to the bar there in 1862. In 1869 he removed to Washington, where for three years he published the United States Jurist.

After his return to Boston in 1874, he devoted himself to office practice and to literary pursuits. He was a lecturer at Boston University School of Law between 1885 and 1903, a non-resident professor and lecturer in the National University Law School, Washington, DC, in 1887–1909, and a lecturer on American history and constitutional law at Johns Hopkins University in 1908.

Schouler is best known, however, as an historian. In 1896–1897 he was president of the American Historical Association. He was elected a member of the American Antiquarian Society in 1907.

He died in Intervale, New Hampshire on April 16, 1920.

== Works ==
His most important work is History of the United States under the Constitution, 1789–1865 (7 vols, 1880–1917) whose components include:

- v. 1. 1783–1801. Rule of Federalism.
- v. 2. 1801–1817. Jefferson Republicans.
- v. 3. 1817–1831. Era of good feeling.
- v. 4. 1831–1847. Democrats and Whigs.
- v. 5. 1847–1861. Free soil controversy.
- v. 6. 1861–1865. The civil war.
- v. 7. 1865–1877. History of the Reconstruction Period.

Among his other publications are:

- A Life of Thomas Jefferson (1893)
- Historical Briefs (1896)
- Constitutional Studies, State and Federal (1897)
- Life of Alexander Hamilton (1901)
- Americans of 1776 (1906)
- Ideals of the Republic (1908)

His legal treatises are:

- The Law of Domestic Relations (1870)
- The Law of Personal Property (1872–1876; new ed., 1907)
- The Law of Bailments (1880)
- The Law of Executors and Administrators (1883)
- The Law of Husband and Wife (1882)
- The Law of Wills (1910)
