= Charles Grier Sellers =

American historian (1923–2021)

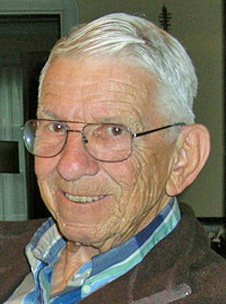
- Sellers in 2008
- Born: September 9, 1923; Charlotte, North Carolina, U.S.
- Died: September 23, 2021 (aged 98); Berkeley, California, U.S.
- Children: 3

Academic background
- Education: Harvard University (AB); University of North Carolina at Chapel Hill (DPhil)

Charles Grier Sellers Jr. (September 9, 1923 – September 23, 2021) was an American historian. Sellers was best known for his book The Market Revolution: Jacksonian America, 1815–1846, which offered a new interpretation of the economic, social, and political events taking place during the United States' Market Revolution.

== Early life and education ==
Sellers was born in Charlotte, North Carolina, on September 9, 1923. His mother, Cora Irene (Templeton), worked for a church society; his father, Charles Grier Sellers, was an executive at Standard Oil and was descended from a family of "two-mule farmers". Sellers was an avid birder; in 1937, at age 14 he co-founded the Mecklenburg Audubon Club with Elizabeth Clarkson and Beatrice Potter, which later became the Mecklenburg Audubon Society. He earned a Bachelor of Arts from Harvard College in History and Literature in 1947 (Class of 1945), graduating Magna Cum Laude. He lived in Grays Hall during his freshman year. His graduation was delayed until 1947 by service in the 85th Infantry Regiment of the 10th Mountain Division (the ski troops) of the United States Army. He served in the army from 1943 to 1945 and achieved the rank of staff sergeant. He was awarded his Doctor of Philosophy from the University of North Carolina at Chapel Hill in 1950.

== Career ==
Sellers first worked as assistant professor in the history department of the University of Maryland from 1950 to 1951. He then taught at Princeton University for eight years. In 1958, he moved to the University of California, Berkeley, where he was promoted to associate and then full professor. He taught there from 1958 to 1990. He was honored as a fellow by the Center for Advanced Study in the Behavioral Sciences at Stanford University in 1960 and 1961. He won a Guggenheim Fellowship in 1963. One year later, he was a visiting professor at El Colegio de Mexico. In 1967 he won the Bancroft Prize in American History for Volume II of his biography of President James K. Polk, titled James K. Polk: Continentalist, 1843–1846. He later served as the Harold Vyvyan Harmsworth Professor of American History at Oxford University during the 1970–71 academic year.

Sellers was a member of the Southern Historical Association, the Organization of American Historians (OAH), and the American Historical Association (AHA).

Sellers was arrested in the Jackson, Mississippi airport on July 21, 1961, as a part of the Freedom Rides. He was later profiled in the nonfiction book Breach of Peace for his role in the event.

=== The Market Revolution: Jacksonian America, 1815–1846 ===
When it was first published in 1991, Charles Sellers’ book The Market Revolution: Jacksonian America, 1815–1846 represented a major scholarly challenge to what had been, until then, one of the central tenets of U.S. history: that of democracy and capitalism marching together, in lockstep. The book was originally commissioned to be part of the Oxford History of the United States series, but its criticism of the historiographical ideal of consensual, democratic capitalism in the U.S. led Oxford University Press to publish it outside the series. One of the book's central arguments is that historians have largely ignored "the stressed and resistant Jacksonian majority", choosing instead to sing the praises of capitalism and ignore the evidence that democracy in the U.S. rose largely in resistance to capitalism, rather than in accord with it. Sellers' book – which synthesized a wealth of extremely diverse sources to make its case – has profoundly impacted all subsequent debates surrounding the Market Revolution in the United States.

== Personal life ==
Sellers was married three times. His first two marriages ended in divorce. He was married to Carolyn Merchant until his death. He had three children.

Sellers died on September 23, 2021, in Berkeley, California, aged 98.

== Awards ==
- 1960–1961. Fellow, Center for Advanced Study in the Behavioral Sciences, Stanford University.
- 1963 Guggenheim Fellowship
- 1967 Bancroft Prize in American History for James K. Polk: Continentalist, 1843–1846.

== Works ==
=== Books ===
- James K. Polk, Jacksonian, 1795–1843. Princeton University Press. 1957.
- Charles Grier Sellers, ed. (1960). "The Travail of Slavery". The Southerner as American. E. P. Dutton.
- Charles Grier Sellers, ed. (1961). Andrew Jackson, Nullification and the State-Rights Tradition. Chicago: Rand McNally.
- "The Market Versus the Agrarian Republic". A Synopsis of American History (1st ed.). Chicago: Rand McNally. 1963.
- James K. Polk: Continentalist, 1843–1846. Princeton University Press. 1966. (Bancroft Prize)
- Andrew Jackson: A Profile. Hill and Wang. 1971. ISBN 978-0-8090-6051-1.
- Charles G. Sellers, "Boom for President," in Charles Sellers, ed., Andrew Jackson: A Profile (New York: Hill and Wang, 1971), pages 57–80.
- Charles Grier Sellers; Henry Farnham May; Neil R. McMillen (1992) [1974]. A Synopsis of American History (7th ed.). Chicago: I. R. Dee. ISBN 978-0-929587-74-5.
- As It Happened: A History of the United States. New York: McGraw-Hill. 1975. ISBN 978-0-07-056179-3.
- The Market Revolution: Jacksonian America, 1815–1846. Oxford University Press. 1991. ISBN 978-0-19-503889-7.

=== Scholarly Articles ===
- "Private Profits and British Colonial Policy: The Speculations of Henry McCulloch," William and Mary Quarterly VIII, no. 4 (October, 1951), 535-551
- "Jim Polk Goes to Chapel Hill," North Carolina Historical Review, XXIX, no. 2 (April, 1952), 189-203
- "Walter Hines Page and the Spirit of the New South," North Carolina Historical Review, XXIX (January, 1953), no. 4, 481-99
- "Jacksonian Democracy," Richard W. Leopold and Arthur S. Link, eds., Problems in American Democracy (New York: Prentice-Hall, Inc., 1952)
- "Colonel Ezekiel Polk: Pioneer and Patriarch," William and Mary Quarterly, X, no. 1 (January, 1953), 80-98
- "James K. Polk's Political Apprenticeship," East Tennessee Historical Society, Publications, No. 25 (1953), 38-53
- "Banking and Politics in Jackson's Tennessee, 1817-1827," Mississippi Valley Historical Review, XLI, no. 1 (June, 1954), 61-84
- "Who Were the Southern Whigs?" American Historical Review, LIX (1954), 335-346
- "Jackson Men with Feet of Clay," American Historical Review, LXII, no. 1 (1958) 537-551
- "John Blair Smith," The Presbyterian Historical Society, XXXIV, no. 4 (Dec. 1956) 201-22
- "Andrew Jackson versus the Historians," Mississippi Valley Historical Review, I, no. 4 (Mar. 1958), 615-634
- "Jacksonian Democracy," Washington, D.C.: American Historical Association, Service Center for Teachers of History, 1958
- "The Travail of Slavery," Charles Sellers, ed., The Southerner as American (Chapel Hill: University of North Carolina Press, 1960), 40-78
- "The Fifty-Fifth Annual Meeting of the Mississippi Valley Historical Association," The Mississippi Valley Historical Review, XLIX, no. 2 (Sept. 1962), 291-312
- "Conservatism and Liberalism in American History," Southern California Social Science Review, I, no. 1 (June, 1962), 10, 19.
- "Trail Blazers of American History," Sacramento: California State Department of Education: The Negro in American History Textbooks: (June, 1964), 1-6
- "Why the Southern States Seceded," Comment, in George Harmon Knoles, ed., The Crisis of the Union, 1860-1861 (Baton Rouge: Louisiana State University Press, 1965), 80-89
- "The Equilibrium Cycle in Two-Party Politics," Public Opinion Quarterly, XXIX, no. 1 (Spring 1965), 17-58
- "The Role of the College Historian," Council for Basic Education: The Role of History in Today's Schools (October, 1966), 13-19
- "The American Revolution: Southern Founders of a National Tradition," Arthur S. Link and Rembert W. Patrick, eds, Writing Southern History: Essays in Historiography in Honor of Fletcher M. Green (Baton Rouge: Louisiana State University Press, 1967), 38-66
- "Old Mecklenburg and the Meaning of the American Experience," North Carolina Historical Review, XLVI, no. 2 (April, 1969), 142-156
- "Is History on the Way Out of the Schools and Do Historians Care?" Social Education: XXXIII, no. 5 (May, 1969), 509-17
- "Verschwindet Geschichte aus unseren Schulen und Kummern sich unsere Historiker darum? Darmstadt: Wissenschaftliche Buchgesellschaft, 1978, 51-69
- "Response," Journal of the Early Republic: A Symposium on Charles Sellers, The Market Revolution: Jacksonian America, 1815-1846, XII, no. 4 (Winter, 1992), 473-76
- "Capitalism and Democracy in American Historical Mythology," The Market Revolution in America, ed., Melvyn Stokes and Stephen Conway (Charlottesville: University Press of Virginia, 1996), Ch 12, 311-329
