= Andrew Jackson and cockfighting =

Business interest and hobby of 7th U.S. president

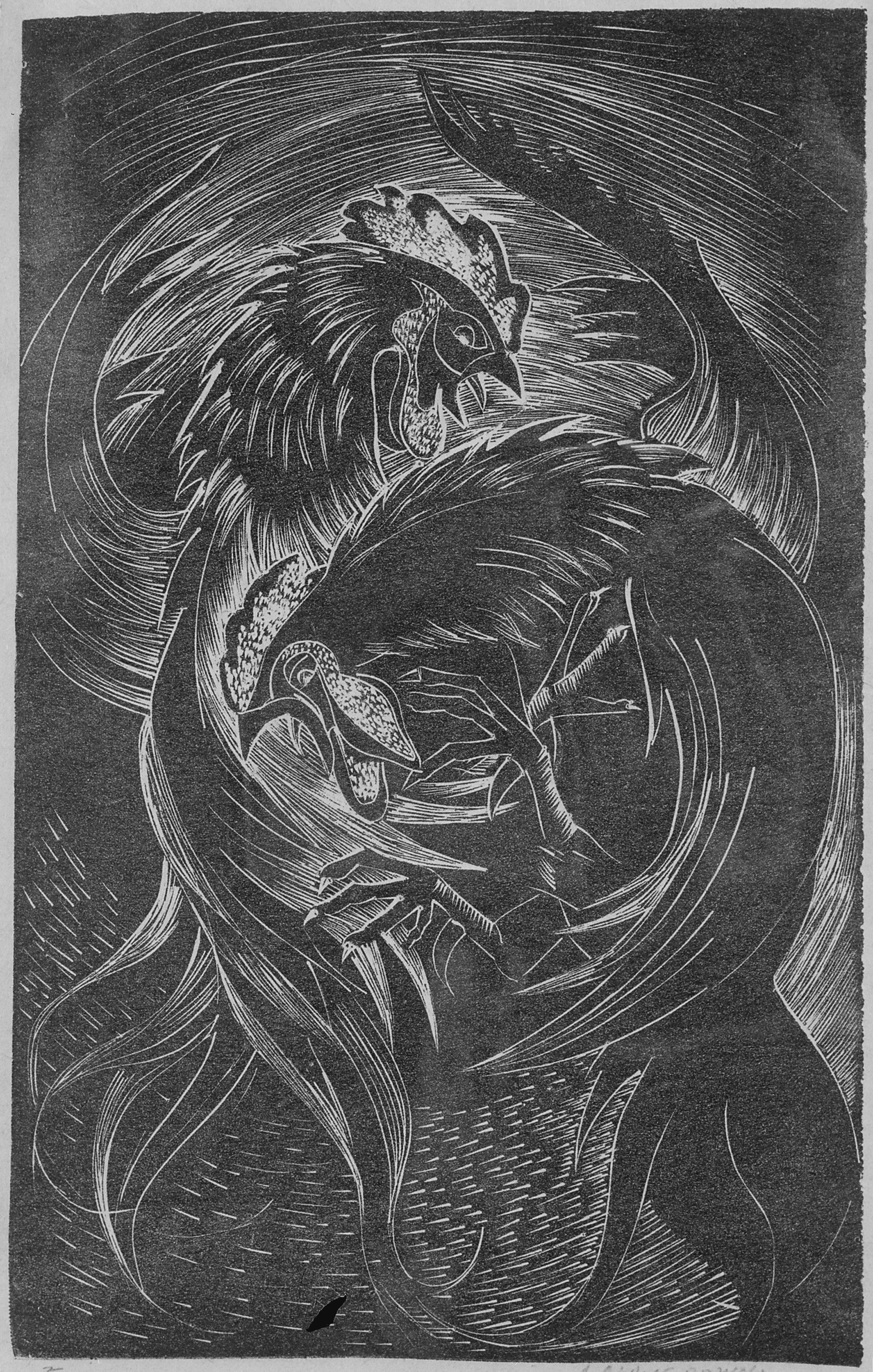
Fighting Cocks by unidentified artist (c. 1962)

U.S. President Andrew Jackson was considered a sportsman because of his lifelong interest in both horse racing and cockfighting. In Nashville, Tennessee, it was said of Jackson: "He had fine horses an he run 'em, he had fine cocks an he fit 'em." These activities were a hobby, a business interest, and socially significant, and they were enjoyed by many men of his era and station. According to one study of sports and sports betting in the early American republic, "Andrew Jackson had made friends through cockfighting and racing early in the nineteenth century, maintained an active racing stable through his presidency, and used his image as an active sportsman to appeal to voters." Betting on horses and cocks "helped build economic and political networks of men, both within and between" social and racial classes. These were considered masculine activities, and the "masculine status invested in gambling only grew between 1790 and 1850, as the new republic's rhetoric of economic opportunity rendered successful risk-taking a key trait of the idealized, upwardly mobile, American 'self-made man'."

== Background ==
Cocking was a typical competitive sport of pioneer settlers, along with fighting (generally), foot races, horse races, shooting, throwing things (tomahawks, hatchets, knives, long bullets), lifting things (shoulder stones), dogfighting, and ganderpulling. However, in the words of historian Thomas D. Clark, "the story of cockfighting on the frontier is not a written one," so there are comparatively few primary sources on 18th- and 19th-century American chicken fighting. Cockfighting had relatively low barriers to entry and was "practiced freely on the frontier," but as a blood sport that killed or maimed the bird contestants, alectoromachy "was never brought out into the open because of a fear of criticism." Caged chickens were transported by flatboat or packhorse, and brought out to fight "under blaze of torches" in a cockpit set up in some secluded spot. Cockfighting generally results in the death of the losing bird, but "is not as visibly gory as many suppose...The puncture wounds made by artificial spurs do not bleed much externally, and the cock's feathers tend to conceal bleeding." Gambling on the birds was expected. Cockfighting, and gambling generally, had wide appeal and social significance in the antebellum South. As articulated by historian Bertram Wyatt-Brown in 1982, "...the union of the individual with the instrument of his prowess—the horse, cocker, cards, marksman's gun, or dice—took on a sacred character."

== History ==
The earliest-dated document in the collected papers of Andrew Jackson (albeit not written in his handwriting) was created March 29, 1779, two weeks after Jackson's 12th birthday. It is a training diet for a fighting cock. The directions are to give the battle rooster smoke-dried Indian corn, finely chopped "Pickle Beaf" three times a day, "lighte wheat Bread Soked in sweet Milk", and "feed him as Much as he Can Eat for Eaight Days." One North Carolinian supposedly remembered 1780s Jackson as "the most roaring, rollicking, game cocking, cardplaying, mischievous fellow that ever lived in Salisbury." Attractions of Jackson's slave-trading stand on Bayou Pierre in what is now Claiborne County, Mississippi included a racetrack and cockfighting pit. William P. Anderson, United States attorney for Tennessee and adjutant of Tennessee militia, came to Jackson's attention as one who supplied "such goodies as game cocks from Virginia and hot tips on land investments." In June 1809, Andrew Jackson, William B. Vinson, Thomas Claiborne (either Thomas Claiborne or Thomas A. Claiborne), William P. Anderson, John Gray Blount (kin to William Blount and Willie Blount), William T. Lewis, and Samuel Hogg formally organized a "cocking ring" event to be held at McNairy's Spring. Anderson's brother Patton Anderson and Jackson apparently jointly organized a series of cockfights for Fourth of July week in 1809, which were heavily patronized and during which "large sums of money and several horses were exchanged."

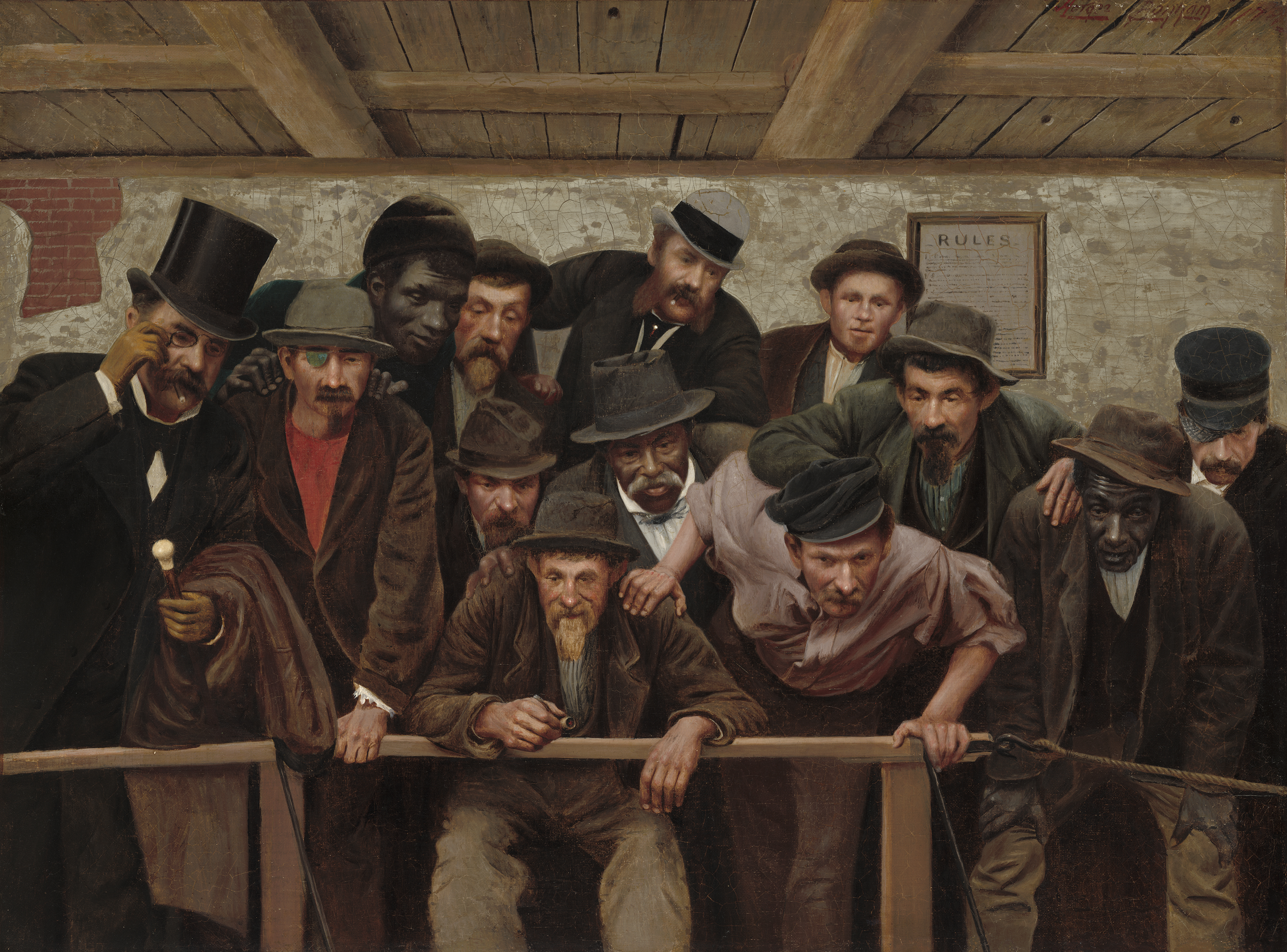
Nearing the Issue at the Cockpit by Horace Bonham (1879)

Cockfighting was one of the amusements at the Jackson-favored Major Lewis Tavern in Nashville. According to one local newspaper, "After his return from the battle of New Orleans,' says Col. A. W. Johnson, who was here at that period, 'Jackson frequently spent weeks at the Inn always surrounded by a coterie of his friends. It was nothing to see a crowd gather in the vacant lot and witness a cock fight, or even a set-to between some of the lookers-on.'" Jackson brought his "fighting cocks and horses" to John Connally's Green Bottom Inn at Huntsville, Alabama, for the fall 1819 sporting season. Jackson lost $500 in a brick-built Gallatin stable to Edward Ward, president of Nashville's Clover Bottom Jockey Club and 1821 candidate for governor, in a bet on a fight between gaffed cocks. The bet was for gold, and Jackson apparently tried to avoid the payout by working the refs. Jackson is said to have once bet a 640-acre property on the outcome of a cockfight, and won the bet. One account, recorded 1881 supposedly via "old Jerry, one of the General's colored attendants," had it that "He always held his own cocks," announcing "'Gentlemen, are you ready?' he would say to de men stanin' roun'. 'Yes,' they would say. 'Then drop your bird,' says de gennel, and de feller ahold de other bird would kinder quail and drop his chicken. Then Massa Jackson, he'd toss his bird in de air and it ud always get in de furs lick. Massa Jackson's bird could always be counted on to get in de furs lick.'"

John Spencer Bassett, a Jackson biographer and the first editor of Jackson's collected papers, asserted, "Cock-fighting was not esteemed so highly as racing, by the gentlemen of the day...It was common among the seacoast colonists of the middle class. In his early life, when he had not entirely cast off the habits of the back-country people, Jackson participated freely in this form of amusement. He even gave himself to it with fervor, as was his nature in all he did. But as his position became established as a member of the highest class he dropped cock-fighting." Bassett to the contrary, and paucity of written records notwithstanding, there are a number of secondhand accounts that suggest Jackson did not give up the game in maturity, but brought his game fowl to Washington with him during his presidency, and even hosted cockfights at the White House. One report says he kept his gamecocks in the White House stables; their feeder-trainer was one Jack Freer. According to a 1938 study of cockfighting in America, Jackson was a "peak of the American legalized gamecock, his administration having seen public pits flourishing in the District of Columbia as well as those famous fights in the committee rooms." Another account says there was a cockfighting pit in the basement of the U.S. Capitol. Frank G. Carpenter, writing in The New York World in 1890, claimed Jackson bet on "cocking mains, which used to be held, during his presidency, on the grounds about the spot where Justice Harlan now lives." In one case Jackson supposedly had his Tennessee gamecocks delivered by stagecoach for a cockfight in Bladensburg, Maryland, but the birds were much worse for wear after the long journey and did not fight. (Cockfighting was "strictly regulated" in the District, but Bladensburg was a separate jurisdiction.) Another story tells that Jackson's cocks fought several mains (a type of cockfighting tournament, compare cockfighting derby) "at the Holmead manor, against the Eslins, who were among the most celebrated breeders of game cocks in America." In an 1898 telling, Jackson ("who was much of a gambler") and his political nemesis Henry Clay apparently both "fought cocks outside of Washington."

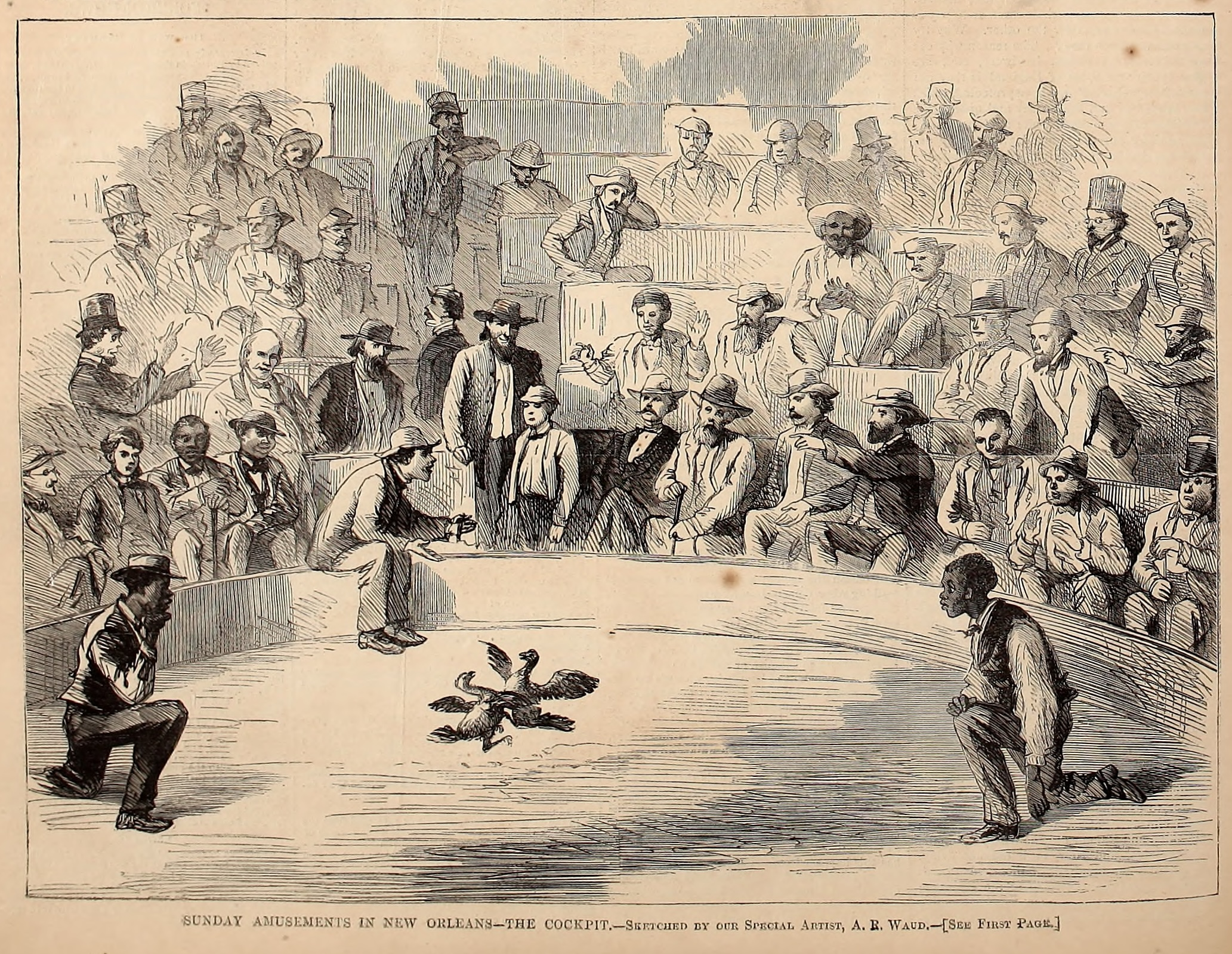
"Sunday Amusements in New Orleans – The Cockpit" by Alfred R. Waud (1866)

At least one New York editor criticized presidential candidate Jackson in 1828 for exploiting slave labor to benefit his "sporting" hobbies: "The whip of the overseer quickens the servile labor whereby he—one of those privileged beings, born to consume the fruits of the earth, is sustained—and men, immortal as himself, are daily 'driven a field', like oxen; and their strength taxed to the utter-most, perhaps, that he, their master, may add another race-horse to his stud, or stake an additional bet upon a favorite game cock."

Cockfighting was by no means solely a rich White sport. As told in an 1885 reminiscence about cockfighting in Nashville:

It was never so open as it was, and is yet, in New Orleans, but the betting and the sport were as heavy. Jordan McGowan, a negro musician and barber, raised many birds of note; also the well-remembered Frank Parish, the colored barber in the old Nashville Inn. A good bird would often last the entire season. Often enough he met his death in two minutes. There were fashionable strains of chickens with long pedigrees. The Claibornes, the Irish Grays, and the Riddlebergers were the most popular. Everybody went to the mains then. Every Saturday night the 'Hole' was open, while Billy Pybus kept open every night. Old Steve, Capt. Pilcher's 'nigger,' and Mark Young's 'niggers' were famous as breeders and keepers of good chickens. In fact the negroes were the authorities on game cocks, and they furnished most of the chickens.

— The Daily American, Nashville, 1885

Two of Jackson's memorable cocks reportedly had the romantic feminine names Bernadotte, and Dominique or Dominica. Jackson is said to have "bred and fought" a variety of black-feathered gamecocks called Tormentors. Another account has it that Jackson is "credited with having originated an excellent strain called the 'Jackson cocks'. They were said to be the best blind fighters on record, being, as some said, more dangerous without eyes than with them."

== See also ==
- Rattle and snap (game)
- Horses of Andrew Jackson
- Early career of Andrew Jackson
- Bibliography of Andrew Jackson
- United States presidential pets
- History of sports in the United States
- History of gambling in the United States

== Sources ==
- Clark, Thomas Dionysius (1939). The Rampaging Frontier: Manners and Humors of Pioneer Days in the South and the Middle West. Indianapolis & New York: The Bobbs-Merrill Company. LCCN 39010115. OCLC 2057074.
- Cohen, Kenneth (Winter 2011). "'The Entreaties and Perswasions of our Acquaintance' Gambling and Networks in Early America". Journal of the Early Republic. 31 (4): 599–638. doi:10.1353/jer.2011.0056. ISSN 0275-1275. JSTOR 41261653.
- Hall, Rita Hiltenbrand (2010). "Colonel Edward Ward: The Life and Death of a Tennessee Senator". West Tennessee Historical Society Papers. LXIV. Memphis, Tennessee: 45–89. ISSN 0361-6215. OCLC 1769643.
- Johnson, Patricia Givens (April 1973). "William P. Anderson and 'The May Letters'" (PDF). Filson Club History Quarterly. 47 (2). Louisville, Kentucky: 171–178. ISSN 0015-1874. OCLC 6674913.
- Pridgen, Tim (1938). Courage, the Story of Modern Cockfighting. Boston: Little, Brown. LCCN 38033201. OCLC 1542369.
- Roberts, B. W. C. (July 1965). "Cockfighting: An Early Entertainment in North Carolina". The North Carolina Historical Review. 42 (3): 306–314. ISSN 0029-2494. JSTOR 23517778.
- Remini, Robert V. (1977). Andrew Jackson and the Course of American Empire, 1767–1821. New York: Harper & Row. ISBN 978-0-8018-5912-0. LCCN 77003766. OCLC 1145801830.
- Rohr, Nancy (Winter–Spring 2010). "Off to the Races". Huntsville Historical Review. 35 (1) 1: 35–57. ISSN 1048-3152. OCLC 7993191 – via University of Alabama in Huntsville Digital Commons.
- Sparks, W. H. (1870). The Memories of Fifty Years: Containing Brief Biographical Notes of Distinguished Americans and Anecdotes of Remarkable Men. Philadelphia: Claxton, Remsen & Haffelfinger. hdl:loc.gdc/scd0001.00100906478. LCCN 06005624. OCLC 1048818176. OL 23365380M – via HathiTrust, copy digitized by Library of Congress.
- Various; Jackson, Andrew (1926). Bassett, John Spencer (ed.). Correspondence of Andrew Jackson, Volume I, to April 30, 1814. Carnegie Institution of Washington Papers of the Historical Research Department No. 371. Baltimore, Maryland: The Lord Baltimore Press. LCCN 26007292. OCLC 2533564 – via HathiTrust. This article incorporates text from this source, which is in the public domain.
- Walker, Anders (August 2024). "What Happened to Nancy Jackson? A Riddle of Race and Resistance on the Southern Frontier". Law and History Review. 42 (3): 521–537. doi:10.1017/S0738248024000294. ISSN 0738-2480.
- Wyatt-Brown, Bertram (2007) [1982]. "Personal Strategies and Community Life: Hospitality, Gambling, and Combat". Southern Honor: Ethics and Behavior in the Old South. New York: Oxford University Press. pp. 327–361. doi:10.1093/oso/9780195325164.003.0013. ISBN 978-0-19-532516-4.
