= Horses of Andrew Jackson =

Business interest and hobby of 7th U.S. president

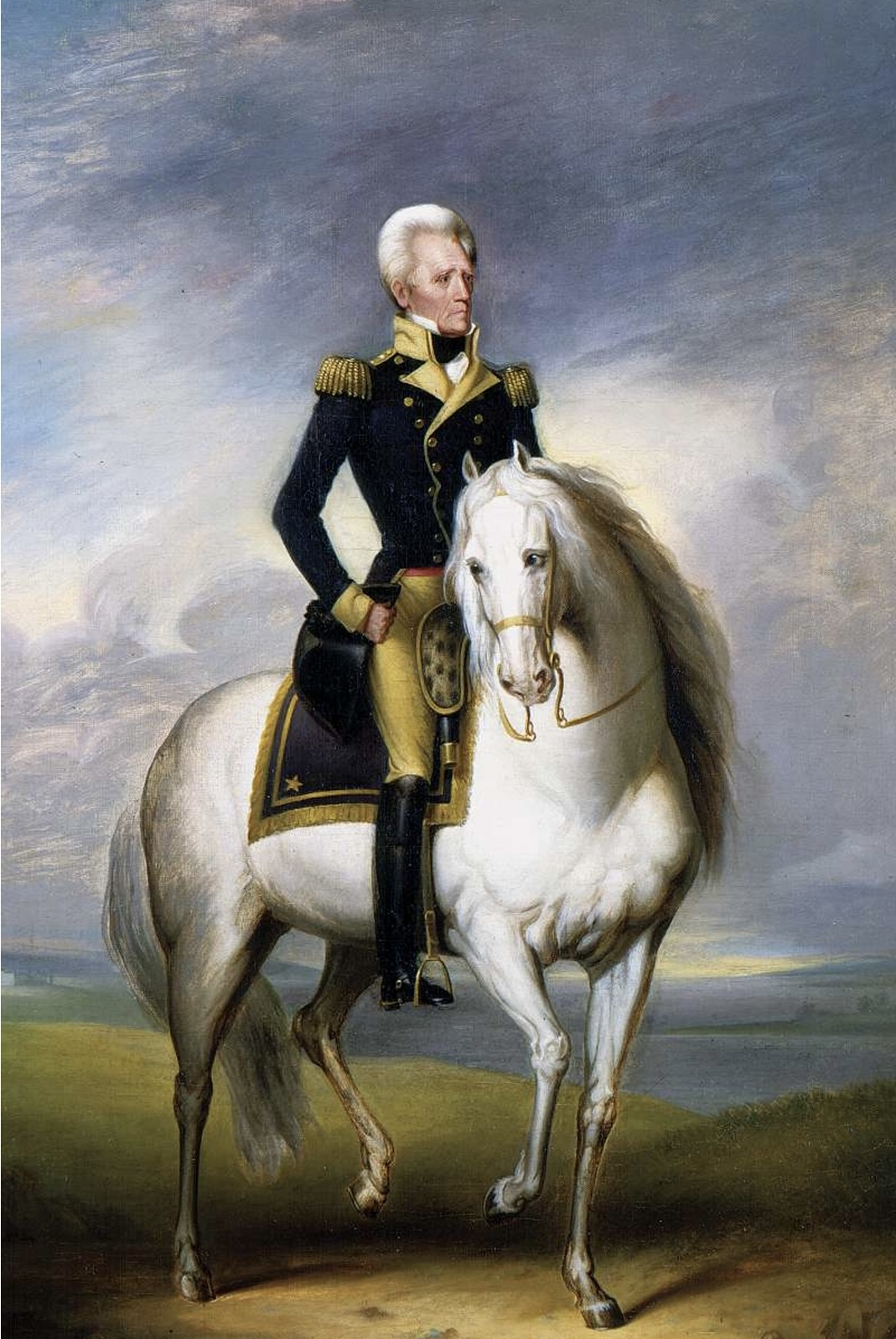
Andrew Jackson Astride Sam Patch by Ralph E. W. Earl (c. 1833)

Andrew Jackson, who served as the seventh U.S. president from 1829 to 1837, was involved with horse trading, and the racehorse business, for much of his life. Jackson-as-equestrian was central to his identity and remains a major part of his public image; historian Donald B. Cole wrote that Marquis James' two-volume biography of Jackson, though Pulitzer Prize-winning, failed to supersede earlier biographies written by James Parton and John Spencer Bassett because James was "content to portray Jackson as a man on horseback."

== Horse trading and horse racing ==
=== Carolinas and Tennessee ===
Jackson worked as a horse trader from a very early age, such that by age 15 in 1782 he was already considered "shrewd." He lived for "a few months" in 1782 with a relative, Joseph White, who worked as a saddler. In August 1787, Rowan County, North Carolina issued a warrant for his arrest subsequent to a lawsuit for £500 filed by a horse trader against Jackson and two friends on charges of trespass on the case (distinct from trespass to land). Jackson posted a recognizance bond, and "no further records exist, suggesting that the case was settled out of court or dismissed."

During his first months living in the Watauga District near the present-day border between North Carolina and Tennessee, in "summer or early fall 1788", Jackson organized and publicized a 0.5-mile (0.80 km) race at the semicircular Greasy Cove racetrack at what is now Erwin, Unicoi County, pitting his racehorse against one fielded by Robert Love, Jackson's acquaintance of four years past, and a veteran of battles with the British, Cherokee (ᏣᎳᎩ, Tsalagi), and Shawnee (Šaawanwaki). The planned matchup between the two horses triggered an absolute frenzy of wagering: "Guns, furs, iron, clothing, cattle, horses, negroes, crops, lands and all the money procurable were staked on the result." Jackson personally rode in the race, and reacted to his defeat with a "Vesuvius of rage", during which display "Jackson denounced the Loves as a 'band of land pirates,' because they held the ownership of nearly all the choice lands in that section." He had apparently ridden into town riding one horse, leading a second horse, "followed by a pack of fox hounds," which led historian Thomas P. Abernethy to conclude, "It was not customary for frontiersmen to fight duels or for newly licensed young lawyers without financial backing to own a race horse. His [Jackson] legal fees could hardly have supported his establishment and his pretensions. The only obvious conclusion is that he found racing profitable. And the gambling that goes with it." According to biographer Robert V. Remini, gambling kept Jackson from "going bankrupt" in early days, and according to historian Hendrik Booraem, Jackson probably played all fours and "'cheating was easy in all fours if one had some skill in handling cards,' which of course Jackson did."

The "first official horse race" in Tennessee was at Gallatin, where Jackson's Indian Queen raced (and lost) "against Dr. R. D. Barry's horse Polly Medley." Beginning in 1805, Jackson was part owner of Clover Bottom Racetrack, an important early racing venue in Davidson County, Tennessee. Clover Bottom was being developed as a plantation when "men from nearby places, Jackson included, formed a jockey club...and laid out a racecourse here." Jackson oversaw construction at Clover Bottom of a racetrack and horse stables, viewing stands, "a tavern or lodging facility", a store, and "booths for hucksters." Sometime between 1805 and 1810, Josephus H. Conn, a Nashville merchant, brought a young boy to Clover Bottom on the occasion of a planned race between Jackson's horse Doublehead and Lazarus Cotton's horse Greyhound. Many decades later, when the boy was Nashville judge and local historian Old Jo Guild of Rose Mont, he estimated that 20,000 people had been present, and he recalled that "a large pound was filled with horses and Negroes bet on the result of the race." Shortly before the planned start, Jackson arrived to claim that Greyhound should be disqualified. He was "riding slowly on a gray horse, with long pistols held in each hand. I think they were as long as my arm and had a mouth that a ground squirrel could enter. In his wake followed my uncle Conn, Stokely Donelson, Patton Anderson, and several others as fierce as bulldogs."

Jackson reportedly patronized Major Bradley's racetrack on the Lascassas Pike 2.5 mi (4.0 km) northeast of Murfreesboro, adjacent to "the old Indian dance ground," in what is now Rutherford County, Tennessee. According to one history, this track was at a plantation called Hurricane Hill, and "It has been said that during the time that Murfreesboro served as the capital of the state of Tennessee [1818–1826], Andrew Jackson won and lost small fortunes at this track. It has been rumored that the enmity that existed between Jackson and Newton Cannon grew out of a wager which resulted in Cannon losing all of his slaves." This track was on the property of John Bradley, who was one of John Coffee's officers during the Creek War, promoted from captain to major after being injured at the Battle of Tallusahatchee.

=== Mississippi Territory including Alabama ===
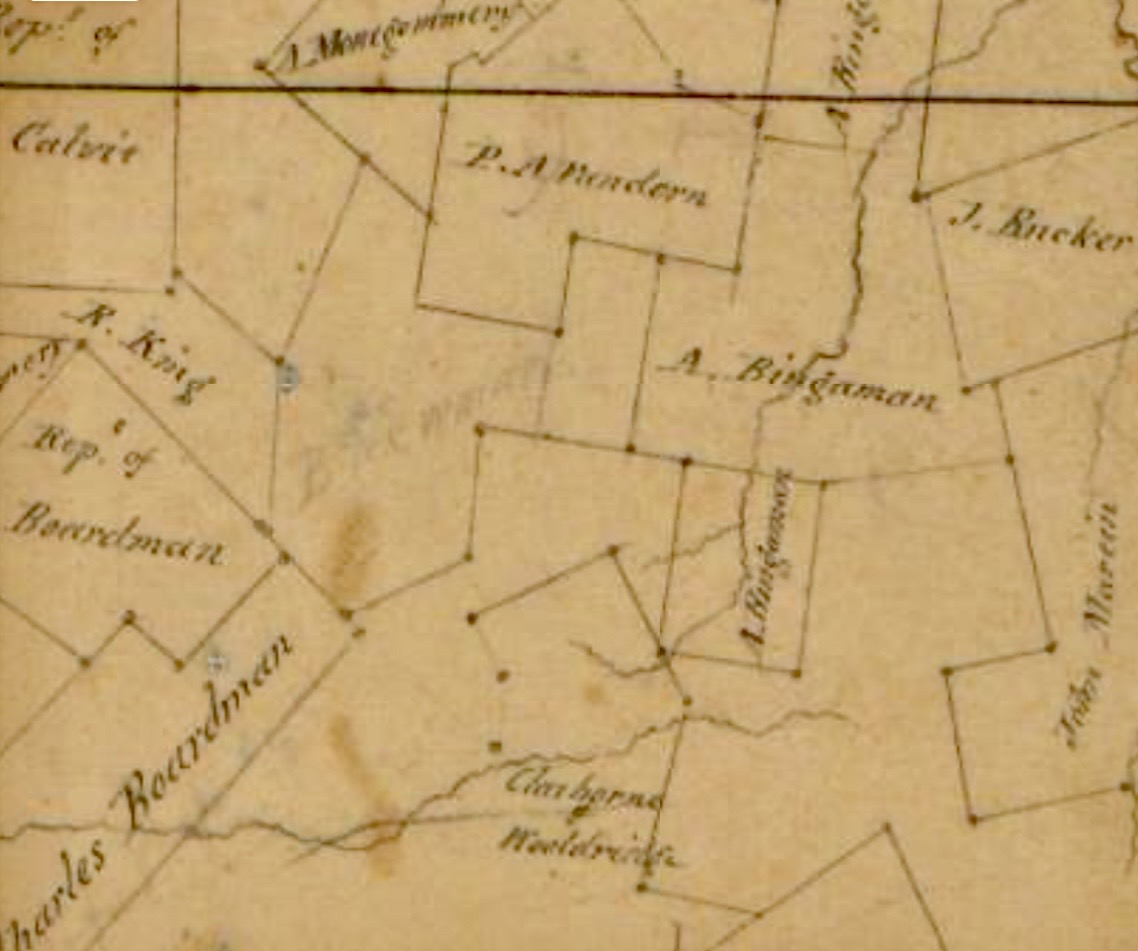
Store of Claiborne & Wooldridge near plantations of P. A. Van Dorn and Joseph Calvit in Claiborne County, Mississippi

When he worked as a merchant and slave trader in the 1790s and 1800s, he or his assistant John Hutchings often shipped both horses and people to "the lower country" for resale. In the telling of W. H. Sparks, at Jackson's slave trading stand at Bruinsburg in Claiborne County "which stood immediately upon the bank of the Mississippi, there was a race-track, for quarter-races, (a sport Jackson was then very fond of,) and many an anecdote was rife, forty years ago, in the neighborhood, of the skill of the old hero in pitting a cock or turning a quarter-horse." He also reportedly bet on races near the store of Mrs. Wooldridge at Rocky Springs, Mississippi. In the words of historian Daniel Walker Howe in What Hath God Wrought: The Transformation of America, 1815–1848, "Slaves Jackson bought and sold in substantial numbers...Jackson is said to have wagered his slaves on horse races. However, he indignantly denied ever having been a professional slave trader."

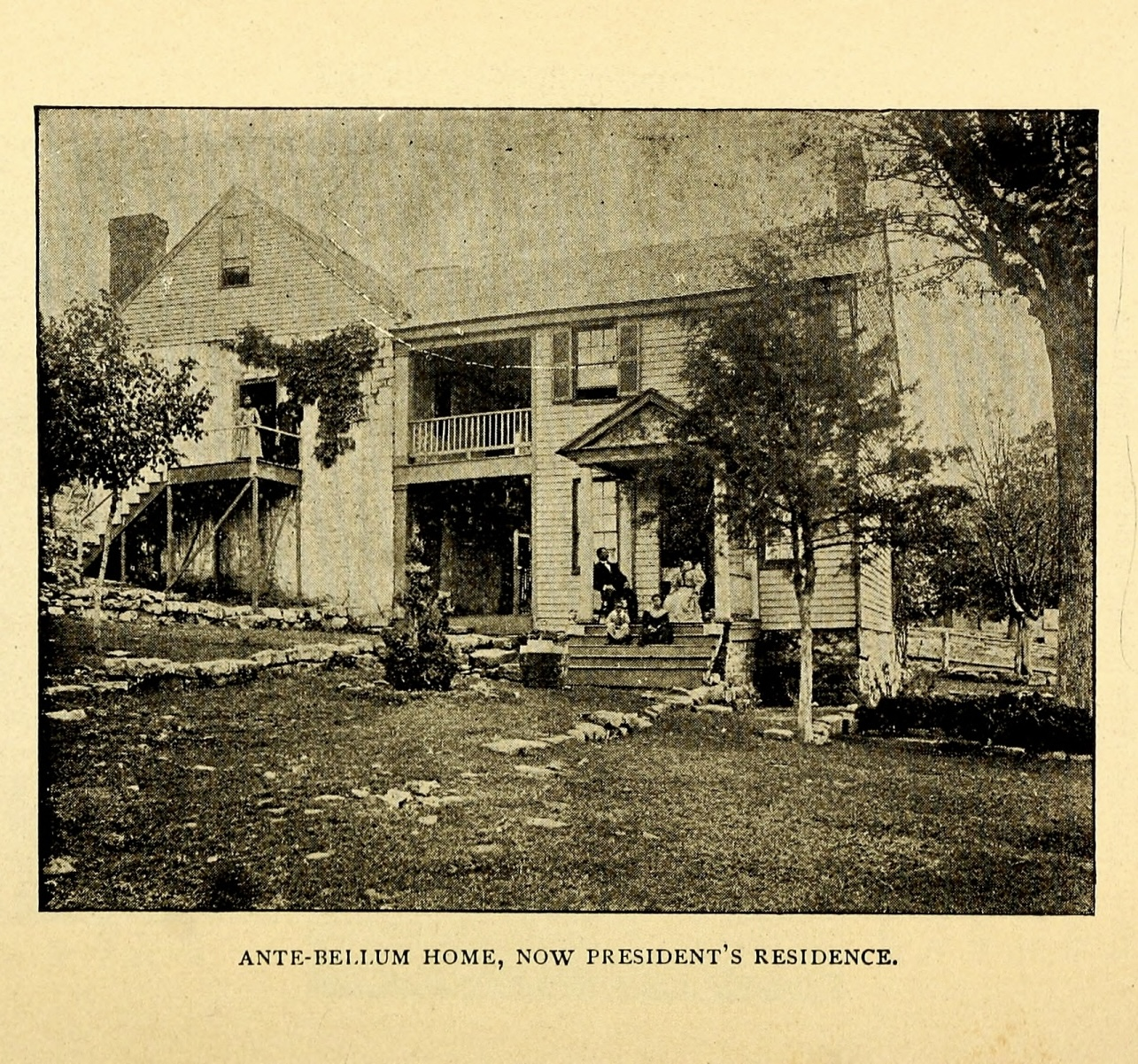
Green Bottom Inn and outbuildings later became part of Alabama A&M University, a Black land-grant university

During the period when what is now Huntsville, Alabama, was part of Mississippi Territory, "Horse racing was a favorite sport; Andrew Jackson raced his thoroughbreds at the tracks at Buckhorn, Green Bottom Inn, and other spots, and it is said, fought his cocks as well." Buckhorn Tavern, located at what is now the intersection of Winchester Road and Maysville Road at New Market, Alabama, was an "early wayside stop for pioneer settlers as they traveled the road from Winchester, Tennessee, into Madison County. The tavern pre-dates the creation of the county, Dec. 13, 1808." According to a local historian writing in 1957, "Here (I was told by a very old man) [that Andrew Jackson] fought his cocks, and raced his horses on the track which circled the rise in what is now Edmund Payne's field; in that man's youth, the track could still be traced."

Green Bottom Inn was established in 1815 in Mississippi Territory along the Meridianville Pike, a road leading toward Huntsville. Horses that raced there included Grey Gander, Molly Long Legs, Bill Austin, Lady Huntsville, Lady Nashville, and Bolivia. Jackson's horse(s) always lost at Green Bottom to Grey Gander, the prize horse of John Connally, whose stables were run and the horses managed by an enslaved Black man named James Conley. The Green Bottom Inn was also the site of an antebellum horse and slave market.

Another important racetrack in colonial Alabama was John Crowell's racetrack at Coweta town, which was patronized by planters including Jackson's longtime friend and personal banker James Jackson.

== Race fixing? ==
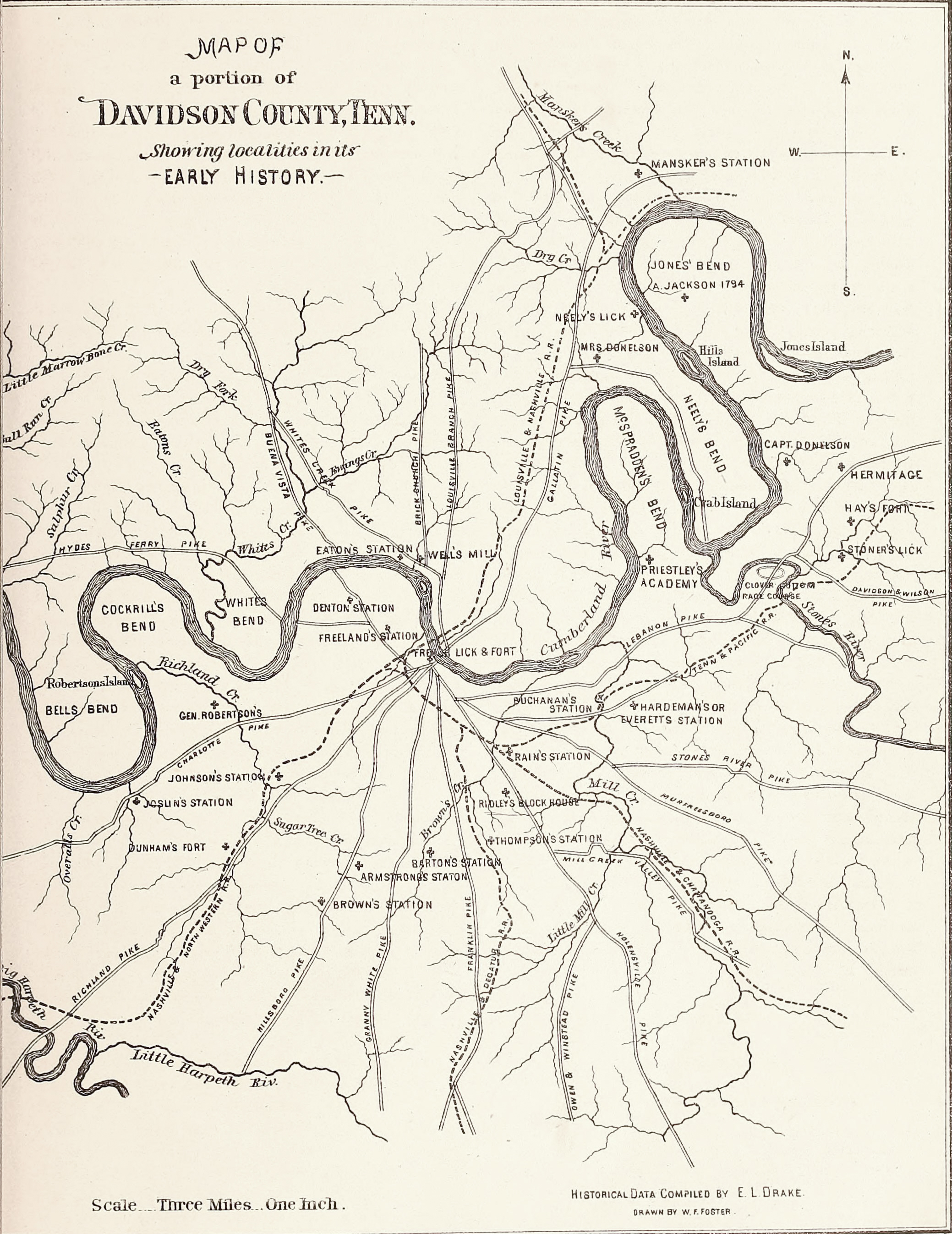
Landmarks of Davidson County, Tennessee in the 1790s and early 1800s including Clover Bottom (1880)

During the 1828 presidential election one anonymized newspaper columnist, "Philo-Tennessean," accused Jackson of having fixed races in his horseman heyday. Philo-Tennessean also asked, "Did you not always carry about with you, to horse-races, cock-fights, &c. a set of bullies, who were ready to fight for you on the slightest occasion? and did they not, on some occasions, when there was a dispute, take the 'stakes' by force?" Perhaps related, Jackson's business partner Patton Anderson "was suspected of fixing the horse races...and on at least two occasions the losers were so enraged they attempted to lynch Anderson. Both times Anderson's life was saved by Andrew Jackson. On one occasion Jackson was able to stall the crowd, giving Anderson time to escape, by clicking a snuff box behind his back to simulate the sound of cocked pistols. On the other occasion, Jackson held drawn pistols on the crowd, allowing Anderson time to escape."

Horseracing historian James Douglas Anderson commented in 1916 that "in his racing contests Jackson seems to have been more successful in defeating his enemies than his friends." A history by John Allison hinted at "indiscretions" and allowed that there were perhaps a "few spots on the otherwise white flower of a blameless life" when it came to Jackson's career in "sport."

== Individual horses ==
The most historically significant horse in his stable was Truxton, simply because the planned race against Joseph Erwin's Ploughboy led to the fatal duel with Erwin's son-in-law Charles Dickinson, which was later made an issue in the 1828 U.S. presidential election. Truxton was the offspring of Diomed and Nancy Coleman. Other important racehorses owned by Jackson included Doublehead, Opossum Filly, and Pacolet. He also owned Bolivia, Busiris, Emilie, Indian Queen, and Lady Nashville, to name a few. One source claims he had horses named President and Vice President. There is an 1836 Edward Troye oil painting of Bolivia in the collection of the Sterling and Francine Clark Art Institute, in Williamstown, Massachusetts.

== Dunwoody ==
Dunwoody
- A black man working with horses, pictured in an early etching of the Hermitage; possibly Dunwoody, possibly Charles, possibly "slave" in the generic
- Born: 1770s? Virginia?
- Died: c. 1845; Tennessee?

Dunwoody was the enslaved horse man who trained Andrew Jackson's racehorses and managed his stable at the Hermitage. When Jackson bought him from John Verrell of Virginia in 1805, Dunwoody was about 30 years old. The name listed on the bill of sale was Dinwiddie, for Dinwiddie County, Virginia, where his previous owners lived, but he was always known as Dunwoody to the Jackson household and business associates. Jackson offered Dunwoody's services to other planters but "constantly demoted and repromoted Dunwoody" for 30 years, "based on his horses' success or failure. The slave was a skilled trainer 'of account' one year, then put under white men after his 'neglect destroyed' or 'ruined' horses the very next season." The editors of The Papers of Andrew Jackson surmised in 2002 that Dunwoody died around 1845. Charles was the carriage driver for the family who "helped Dunwoody train the thoroughbreds."

== White House stable ==
Jackson sold off a number of his horses in 1816. That said, Jackson was the first president to keep his own stable at the White House. The racehorses he had while President were nominally owned by his son, Andrew Jackson Jr. According to biographer Stanley Horn, "...it is plain to see that Jackson had a very exalted idea of the position he held and a keen understanding of the desirability of keeping the occupant of the President's chair entirely disassociated with the sordid business of horse racing." Jackson's White House horses "so overflowed the Monroe stable that wooden shanties had to be built for further housing along the west fence of the grounds," and Jackson later convinced Congress to fund the construction of a larger brick-built stable, which stood from 1834 to 1857. When Junior got into financial trouble during and after his presidency, Jackson sold off his stable of thoroughbreds to help raise funds for debt service.

== Opponents ==
In old age, Jackson told an interviewer that his one abiding regret in life was that none of his horses had ever been able to beat Jesse Haynie's Maria in a race. There were nine separate times when Maria raced horses owned by Andrew Jackson, including races against Decatur, a son of Truxton. As one example of Jackson's grandiosity in gambling, it is told that in 1815 a large friend saw fit to physically pick up Jackson and carry him away in order to prevent him from betting $10,000 (equivalent to $175,909 in 2025) that his horse Yellow Queen would win her race against Jesse Haynie's Maria. Yellow Queen lost, Maria won.

Hanie's Maria, purchased in 1809 for $100 as a one-year-old, was trained by one Green Berry Williams beginning in 1811, and "in her first three seasons she easily won every contest and roused Gen. Jackson's ire, which was also easily done. Jackson canvassed Virginia for a horse to beat Maria and paid a fabulous price to Wm. R. Johnson for Pacolet only to have her beaten by Maria under the saddle of 'Monkey Simon', a dissipated and impudent African hunchback, then noted for his performances as were Barnes and Tod Sloan a few years ago. A little later, at Clover Bottom, Maria and 'Monkey Simon' took all the purses that were up. She beat everything sent here to run against her and then she went to Kentucky and conquered the hitherto-unbeaten Robin Grey, the great grandsire of Lexington, 'the racer without a peer, the sire without a rival.'" Her jockey was an enslaved man named Simon, also known as Prince and Monkey Simon. According to one account, "Before one contest, Jackson approached the rider and said, 'Now Simon, when my horse and rider come to pass you, don't spit your tobacco juice in their eyes.' 'Why General,' the Prince replied, 'I rode a great deal against your horses, but none of them ever got close enough to catch my spit.'"

Another case of Andrew Jackson demonstrating interest in an enslaved horseman comes from a report that he once offered to buy Abdul Rahman Ibrahima Sori from Thomas Foster of Natchez. Ibrahima was an enslaved Prince of Fula who "in spite of his language deficit and the fact that he never made a good farmer...earned his keep as herder and an excellent handler of horses."

The symbol of the Democratic Party is a donkey in part because opponents of Andrew Jackson unironically called him a jackass during the 1828 U.S. presidential election, thus forging another enduring association between Jackson and animals of the genus Equus.

== See also ==
- Early career of Andrew Jackson
- Andrew Jackson and cockfighting
- Andrew Jackson and slavery
- List of violent incidents involving Andrew Jackson
- Bibliography of Andrew Jackson
- History of sports in the United States
- History of gambling in the United States
- Horse industry in Tennessee
- Rattle and snap (game)
- William Edward Butler
- Pharsalia Race Course
- Glencoe I
- Thomas Truxtun – United States Navy officer (1755–1822)
- Doublehead – Cherokee leader (1744–1807)
- Equestrian statue of Andrew Jackson (Washington, D.C.)
- Horsemanship of Ulysses S. Grant
- United States presidential pets

== Sources ==
- Abernethy, Thomas Perkins (1932). From frontier to plantation in Tennessee; a study in frontier democracy. Chapel Hill: University of North Carolina Press. LCCN 32012393. OCLC 1279340.
- Allison, John (1897). Dropped Stitches in Tennessee History. Nashville: Marshall & Bruce Co. hdl:loc.gdc/scd0001.00146459547. LCCN rc01001272. OCLC 60722027. OL 17359025W. – Also digitized by Project Gutenberg This article incorporates text from this source, which is in the public domain.
- Anderson, James Douglas; Peyton, Balie (1916). Making the American Thoroughbred: Especially in Tennessee, 1800–1845, Including Reminiscences of the Turf. Norwood, Massachusetts: The Plimpton Press. hdl:1017/d/print/1316111. LCCN 16016543. OCLC 4974195. OL 7741515W. – Also digitized by UPenn Libraries This article incorporates text from this source, which is in the public domain.
- Arthur, John Preston (1914). Western North Carolina: A History (from 1730 to 1913). Raleigh, North Carolina: Edwards & Broughton Printing Co. LCCN 14019632. OCLC 2937706. OL 5080480W.
- Bancroft, Frederic (2023) [1931, 1996]. Slave Trading in the Old South (Original publisher: J. H. Fürst Co., Baltimore). Southern Classics Series. Introduction by Michael Tadman (Reprint ed.). Columbia, South Carolina: University of South Carolina Press. ISBN 978-1-6433-6427-8. LCCN 95020493. OCLC 1153619151.
- Booraem, Hendrik (2001). Young Hickory: the making of Andrew Jackson. Dallas, Texas: Taylor Trade Publishing. ISBN 978-0-87833-263-2. LCCN 00048820.
- Burstein, Andrew (2003). The Passions of Andrew Jackson. New York: Alfred A. Knopf. ISBN 978-0-3754-1428-2. LCCN 2002016258. OCLC 49385944.
- Cheathem, Mark R. (2014). Andrew Jackson, Southerner. Baton Rouge, Louisiana: Louisiana State University Press. ISBN 978-0-8071-5099-3. LCCN 2012049695. OCLC 858995561. Project MUSE book 26506.
- Cohen, Kenneth (2017). They Will Have Their Game: Sporting Culture and the Making of the Early American Republic. Cornell University Press. ISBN 9781501714214. Project MUSE book 56379.
- Cole, Donald B. (September 1985). "Honoring Andrew Jackson Before All Other Living Men". Reviews in American History. 13 (3). Baltimore, Maryland: The Johns Hopkins University Press: 359–366. doi:10.2307/2702090. ISSN 0048-7511. JSTOR 2702090.
- DesChamps, Margaret Burr (September 1947). "Early Days in the Cumberland Country". Tennessee Historical Quarterly. VI (3): 195–229. ISSN 0040-3261. JSTOR 42620950.
- Hall, Rita Hiltenbrand (2010). "Colonel Edward Ward: The Life and Death of a Tennessee Senator". West Tennessee Historical Society Papers. LXIV. Memphis, Tennessee: 45–89. ISSN 0361-6215. OCLC 1769643.
- Harrell, Laura D. S. (November 1966). "Jockey Clubs and Race Tracks in Antebellum Mississippi, 1795–1861". Journal of Mississippi History. XXVIII (4). Jackson, Mississippi: Mississippi Historical Society in cooperation with the Mississippi Department of Archives and History: 304–318. ISSN 0022-2771. OCLC 1782329.
- Hickey, Donald R. (Winter 1976). "Andrew Jackson and the Army Haircut: Individual Rights vs. Military Discipline". Tennessee Historical Quarterly. 35 (4): 365–375. ISSN 0040-3261. JSTOR 42623606.
- Howe, Daniel Walker (2007). What Hath God Wrought: The Transformation of America, 1815–1848. Oxford History of the United States. New York: Oxford University Press. ISBN 978-0-19-507894-7. LCCN 2007012370. OCLC 122701433.
- Jackson, Andrew (1980). Smith, Sam; Owsley, Harriet (eds.). The Papers of Andrew Jackson: Volume I, 1770–1803. University of Tennessee Press. doi:10.7290/utp7943. ISBN 978-0-87049-219-8.
- Jackson, Andrew (1984). Moser, Harold; Macpherson, Sharon (eds.). The Papers of Andrew Jackson, Volume II, 1804–1813. University of Tennessee Press. doi:10.7290/utp3038. ISBN 978-0-87049-441-3.
- Jackson, Andrew (2002). Moser, Harold; Clift, J. Clint; Wells, Wyatt (eds.). The Papers of Andrew Jackson, Volume VI, 1825–1828. University of Tennessee Press. doi:10.7290/utp7151. ISBN 978-1-57233-174-7.
- Johnson, Patricia Givens (April 1973). "William P. Anderson and 'The May Letters'" (PDF). Filson Club History Quarterly. 47 (2). Louisville, Kentucky: 171–178. ISSN 0015-1874. OCLC 6674913.
- Jones, Kathleen Paul (1971). "Madison County Mississippi Territorial Period, 1804–1817". Huntsville Historical Review. 1 (1) 5: 34–45 – via University of Alabama at Huntsville LOUIS Digital Commons.
- Kupfer, Barbara Stern (Fall 1970). "A Presidential Patron of the Sport of Kings: Andrew Jackson". Tennessee Historical Quarterly. 29 (3): 243–255. ISSN 0040-3261. JSTOR 42623730.
- Mitchell, Dennis J. (2014). A New History of Mississippi. Jackson: University Press of Mississippi. p. 44. ISBN 9781626740198. LCCN 2013044104. OCLC 863127649. Project MUSE book 33980.
- Roberts, B. W. C. (1965). "Cockfighting: An Early Entertainment in North Carolina". The North Carolina Historical Review. 42 (3): 306–314. ISSN 0029-2494. JSTOR 23517778.
- Ross, Harvey Lee (1899). The Early Pioneers and Pioneer Events of the State of Illinois Including Personal Recollections of the Writer of Abraham Lincoln, Andrew Jackson and Peter Cartwright, Together With a Brief Autobiography of the Writer. Chicago: Eastman Brothers. LCCN 09030102. OCLC 181327605. OL 7013514M – via HathiTrust.
- Thomas, Jane Henry (1897). Old Days in Nashville, Tennessee. Nashville, Tennessee: Publishing house Methodist Episcopal church, South, Barbee & Smith, agents. hdl:loc.gdc/scd0001.00146133502. LCCN 08018615. OCLC 4159540. OL 140000W.
- Sparks, W. H. (1870). The Memories of Fifty Years: Containing Brief Biographical Notes of Distinguished Americans and Anecdotes of Remarkable Men. Philadelphia: Claxton, Remsen & Haffelfinger. hdl:loc.gdc/scd0001.00100906478. LCCN 06005624. OCLC 1048818176. OL 23365380M – via HathiTrust, copy digitized by Library of Congress.
- WPA Federal Writers' Project (1939). Tennessee: A Guide to the Volunteer State. American Guide Series. Tennessee Department of Conservation, Division of Information. New York: The Viking Press. LCCN 49005822. OCLC 751379. OL 6046937M. This article incorporates text from this source, which is in the public domain.
- Various; Jackson, Andrew (1926). Bassett, John Spencer (ed.). Correspondence of Andrew Jackson, Volume I, to April 30, 1814. Carnegie Institution of Washington Papers of the Historical Research Department No. 371. Baltimore, Maryland: The Lord Baltimore Press. LCCN 26007292. OCLC 2533564 – via HathiTrust. This article incorporates text from this source, which is in the public domain.
- Walker, Anders (August 2024). "What Happened to Nancy Jackson? A Riddle of Race and Resistance on the Southern Frontier". Law and History Review. 42 (3): 521–537. doi:10.1017/S0738248024000294. ISSN 0738-2480.
- Wasson, Joberta (1984). "Huntsville's Old Hotels". The Historic Huntsville Quarterly. 10 (3): 24–41.
- Webb, Gary Alan (Spring 1984). "The Magness Trials" (PDF). Williamson County Historical Journal. 15. Franklin, Tennessee: 21–34. LCCN 86642787. OCLC 14186085.
