= Patton Anderson (speculator) =

Tennessee trader and murder victim (d. 1810)

Patton Anderson (d. October 24, 1810), name frequently misspelled Patten Anderson, was a trader of horses, slaves, and land warrants in early 19th-century Tennessee, United States. He also managed or invested in horse racetracks. His friendship with future U.S. president Andrew Jackson led to a role in the Burr conspiracy and involvement in the epistolary gangland feud that preceded the duel in which Jackson killed Charles Dickinson. Anderson was shot and killed by David Magness in the Shelbyville public square in 1810.

== Early career ==
Patton Anderson was from Virginia, probably born 1775 to 1780 (or thereabouts). His brother was William Preston Anderson, a speculator, a U.S. attorney for the federal judicial district of Tennessee, and an important aide-de-camp to Tennessee militia general Andrew Jackson. The parents of Wm. P. Anderson and Patton Anderson were likely Margaret Belle Patton and her second husband William Anderson.

It is unclear when Anderson relocated from Virginia to Tennessee, but it was sometime before 1804. He has been described as one of Andrew Jackson's "longtime business and sporting associates." Anderson datelined his letters "Bachelor's Hall," and in May 1804 Jackson seemingly prompted unmarried John Coffee to go visit his place. Patton Anderson apparently worked as a trader of land warrants, horses, and slaves. He, like his brother, was prominent in the community, a "large land owner and inspector general of the Tennessee Militia...Unfortunately, Major Anderson was also known to associate with the wrong sort of people, and at times he was overbearing and belligerent. Anderson was a heavy drinker and a mean drunk. His violent temper continuously involved him in numerous quarrels and fights." One memoir of early Nashville, published in 1897, tells that, "Where the Normal College grounds now are Pryor, Anderson & Rutherford had a racetrack. Old Mr. Rains had a farm just beyond this. He used to come to town, and sometimes stay very late at night. When he went home he had to pass the race-track, and he always said that he saw Dick Pryor, Patton Anderson, and the devil killing race-horses."

Patton was involved in running the racetrack at Clover Bottom that was co-owned by Andrew Jackson from about 1805. According to one telling, Anderson "was suspected of fixing the horse races...and on at least two occasions the losers were so enraged they attempted to lynch Anderson. Both times Anderson's life was saved by Andrew Jackson. On one occasion Jackson was able to stall the crowd, giving Anderson time to escape, by clicking a snuff box behind his back to simulate the sound of cocked pistols. On the other occasion, Jackson held drawn pistols on the crowd, allowing Anderson time to escape." Judge Jo. C. Guild of Rose Mont recalled an occasion of his childhood when "my uncle [Josephus] Conn, Stokely Donelson, Patton Anderson, and several others, as fierce as bull dogs" escorted Andrew Jackson into the Clover Bottom track, armed with pistols, to declare that Jackson's opponent's horse ought to be disqualified.

In late 1805, Anderson was involved in the business squabbles that devolved into the fatal Jackson–Dickinson duel. As summarized by the editors of The Papers of Andrew Jackson:

...rumors circulated that Jackson had claimed in public conversation that [Joseph] Erwin and [Charles] Dickinson had attempted to pay the forfeit [for a canceled horse race] in [promissory] notes different from those agreed upon. The story, allegedly first dispensed by Patton Anderson, brought into question the honor of all those involved in the dispute. Thomas Swann picked it up and checked with Jackson, who said, according to Swann, that Dickinson's notes were the same as those listed in the stake; Erwin's were different. Swann relayed the information to Erwin and Dickinson. They met with Jackson on December 28, and, Swann stated, at that time Jackson denied having made an accusation against Erwin and called the peddler of the tale a liar.

In 1808 a judgment was rendered against Anderson that forced the sale of 700 acres he owned on the "war trace fork of Duck River." Patton Anderson and Andrew Jackson apparently jointly organized a series of cockfights for Fourth of July week in 1809, which were heavily patronized and during which "large sums of money and several horses were exchanged."

== Burr conspiracy ==
In the telling of historian Thomas P. Abernethy, in October 1805, former U.S. Vice President Aaron Burr send $3,500 in "Kentucky bank notes" for five of the large boats that Jackson's company produced and sold in the Cumberland River valley, as well as "for the purchase of supplies." At the same time, Jackson's "friend, Patton Anderson, was appointed recruiting agent in Tennessee and he succeeded in enlisting 75 men, including Mrs. Jackson's nephew, Stockly Hays." By December 1805, "suspicions had been aroused" about the nature of Burr's expedition; 17-year-old Hays was sent along but "Anderson failed to show up with his 75 recruits, and only a small quantity of provisions had been collected." Burr took two of the five boats he commissioned from Jackson, and according to a statement of John Coffee "made in connection with Blennerhassett v. Burr, the remaining three boats were either delivered to Patton Anderson, who held a draft from Burr in his favor, or were sold and the proceeds given to Anderson."

A letter from Nathaniel W. Williams published in 1828 had it that Theodore Burton of McMinnville "a man of truth, and respectability, as I have heard here...was one of Burr's men, he was mustered into service at the Clover Bottom, with arms in his hands—that about seventy-five men signed the list of enrollment at the same time with himself—that at that time Gen. Jackson and Aaron Burr, were on the ground, and that Patten Anderson was his Captain. Burton says when the men under Anderson separated, it was under an agreement, as to the time when they were to march off with Burr, as his men—and that before that time came round, the matter bursted." Williams, a state court judge, elsewhere recounted, "Afterwards, during the setting of the County Court of Sumner, at a time when Patton Anderson told me that either Burr or Adair, or both of them, were at General Jackson's house. In a room of a tavern then kept by Edmond Crutcher, Gen. Jackson said to me—I think Judge Stuart was then in the room—'Take notice, gentlemen, you will find that a division of the United States has taken deep root; you will find that a number of the Senate, and a number of the members of the House of Representatives are deeply involved in the scheme.'"

In Virginia during the 1828 presidential campaign, a newspaper published a critical account of Jackson's conduct at the Burr trial in Richmond, concluding that Jackson departed shortly after James Wilkinson's testimony because "found the moral atmosphere of Richmond unlike that which he formerly breathed at Nashville—he found no congenial spirits there—no Patten Andersons—no bravos and bullies to back him, as in the case of the Bentons; spurned and neglected at Richmond, he slunk away unnoticed and forgotten, until circumstances called him as a militia General into the service, against the Indians, when fortune suddenly transformed him from a Rowdy at a cock-fight—a bully on a race-course—a duellist and a negro-trader, into a 'hero of two wars'."

== Murder ==
David Magness shot and killed Patton Anderson in broad daylight on October 24, 1810, in front of the Bedford County courthouse at Shelbyville, Tennessee. Knoxville editor George Wilson incorporated an obituary into his report of the murder:

Perhaps few men ever lived as publicly as Mr. Anderson, whose character is as difficult to sketch...he imbibed in early youth habits which in riper years he was the slave of. The worst of which were his uncontrollable passions, in the fury of which his native goodness of heart peeped out like the sun from behind a cloud and shed a lustre over his failings: but a continual round of sporting often laid him open to knaves, who profiting by the confidence placed in them, plundered him of his wealth, and added strength to his ungovernable passions. Aside from the influence of this bane, none had a kinder heart, a more benevolent disposition, or were more constant in their friendships, of which several instances could be mentioned much to the credit of the deceased. He had clear understanding and a correct judgment but he is gone in the prime of life, and his good and bad qualities lie buried in his grave.

Alfred Balch was the prosecutor on the case, and Felix Grundy and Jenkin Whiteside were the defense attorneys. During the first of three prosecutions of Magness and kinsmen Perry Green Magness and Jonathan Magness, Patton Anderson was characterized as an unruly drunk and a violent character generally. The Magnesses also seemed to have unsavory reputations. Lawyers examining witnesses asked questions like "Did you ever bite off Dick Scruggs' nose?"

Character witnesses in Anderson's favor included Nashville mayor Joseph Coleman, and Andrew Jackson, who undermined the prosecution's case when he testified something to the effect of "Sir, my friend Patton Anderson was the natural enemy of villains and scoundrels!" None of the Magnesses were convicted of anything in the shooting death of Anderson, although by the time the cases were resolved two years later they had served considerable time in jail.

The Magnesses later relocated to Arkansas. Future Tennessee governor Newton Cannon was one of the jurors who voted to acquit; apparently because of this he "became the object of Jackson's displeasure...for some reason Cannon was marked by Jackson as the cause of the acquittal."

== See also ==
- List of violent incidents involving Andrew Jackson
- Early career of Andrew Jackson
- Horses of Andrew Jackson
- Bibliography of Andrew Jackson
- Bibliography of the Burr conspiracy

== Sources ==
- Abernethy, Thomas P. (1954). The Burr Conspiracy. New York: Oxford University Press. LCCN 54006907. OCLC 710644.
- Campbell, Jack MacGregor (2017). The Great Magness Trial: The Killing of Patton Anderson, The Trial of the Magness Family, & the Pursuit of Justice on the Tennessee Frontier. Dickson, Tennessee: Braybree Publishing. ISBN 978-1-940127-12-5. LCCN 2017278701. OCLC 1040034531.
- Guild, Josephus Conn (1878). Old times in Tennessee, with historical, personal, and political scraps and sketches. Nashville: Tavel, Eastman & Howell. LCCN 05033165. OCLC 4767011. OL 3148850W – via HathiTrust.
- Jackson, Andrew (1984). Moser, Harold; Macpherson, Sharon (eds.). The Papers of Andrew Jackson, Volume II, 1804–1813. University of Tennessee Press. doi:10.7290/utp3038. ISBN 978-0-87049-441-3.
- Thomas, Jane Henry (1897). Old Days in Nashville, Tennessee. Nashville, Tennessee: Publishing house Methodist Episcopal church, South, Barbee & Smith, agents. hdl:loc.gdc/scd0001.00146133502. LCCN 08018615. OCLC 4159540. OL 140000W.
- Vance, Mildred Ethel (1908). Tennessee Politics in the Jackson Era (M.A. thesis). University of Wisconsin. OCLC 608865724.
- Webb, Gary Alan (Spring 1984). "The Magness Trials" (PDF). Williamson County Historical Journal. 15. Franklin, Tennessee: 21–34. LCCN 86642787. OCLC 14186085.
