= Bibliography of Andrew Jackson =

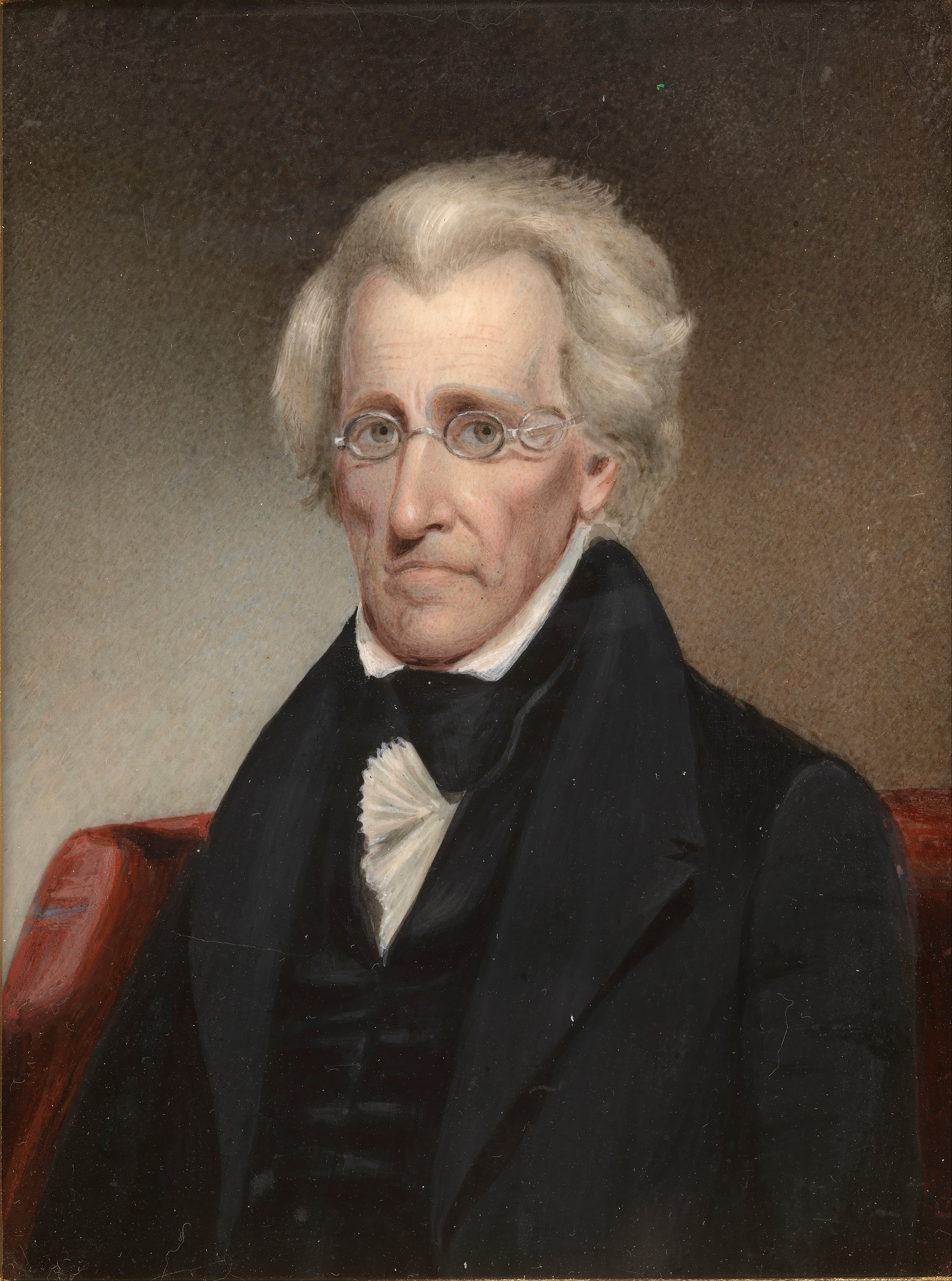
Andrew Jackson by James Tooley Jr. (1840)

The following is a list of important scholarly resources related to Andrew Jackson.

Andrew Jackson, I am given to understand, was a patriot and a traitor. He was one of the greatest of generals, and wholly ignorant of the art of war. A writer brilliant, elegant, eloquent, without being able to compose a correct sentence, or spell words of four syllables. The first of statesmen, he never devised, he never framed a measure. He was the most candid of men, and was capable of the profoundest dissimulation. A most law-defying, law-obeying citizen. A stickler for discipline, he never hesitated to disobey a superior. A democratic autocrat. An urbane savage. An atrocious saint.

— James Parton, Life of Andrew Jackson (1860)

== Key biographies ==
- Bassett, John Spencer (1911). The Life of Andrew Jackson. New York: Doubleday Page & Company. Vol. 1 & Vol. 2 – HathiTrust
- Cheathem, Mark R. (2013). Andrew Jackson, Southerner. Baton Rouge, LA: Louisiana State University Press. ISBN 978-0807-15098-6.
- Parton, James (1860a). Life of Andrew Jackson, Volume 1. New York: Mason Brothers. OCLC 3897681. (HathiTrust catalog)
- Parton, James (1860b). Life of Andrew Jackson, Volume 2. New York: Mason Brothers. OCLC 3897681.
- Parton, James (1860c). Life of Andrew Jackson, Volume 3. New York: Mason Brothers. OCLC 3897681.
- Remini, Robert V. (1977). Andrew Jackson and the Course of American Empire, 1767–1821. New York: Harper & Row Publishers, Inc. ISBN 0-8018-5912-3.
- Remini, Robert V. (1981). Andrew Jackson and the Course of American Freedom, 1822–1832. New York: Harper & Row Publishers, Inc. ISBN 978-0-8018-5913-7.
- Remini, Robert V. (1984). Andrew Jackson and the Course of American Democracy, 1833–1845. New York: Harper & Row Publishers, Inc. ISBN 0-8018-5913-1.

== Biographies, 20th and 21st centuries ==
- Booraem, Hendrik (2001). Young Hickory: The Making of Andrew Jackson. Lanham, MD: Taylor Trade Publishing. ISBN 0-8783-3263-4.; 344 pages; coverage to age 21
- Brands, H. W. (2005). Andrew Jackson: His Life and Times. New York: Knopf Doubleday Publishing Group. ISBN 1-4000-3072-2.
- Brown, David S. (2022). The First Populist: The Defiant Life of Andrew Jackson. New York: Charles Scribner's Sons. ISBN 978-1-9821-9109-2.
- Burstein, Andrew (2003). The Passions of Andrew Jackson. New York: Alfred A. Knopf. ISBN 978-0-3754-1428-2. LCCN 2002016258. OCLC 49385944.
- Curtis, James C. (1976). Andrew Jackson and the Search for Vindication. Boston: Little, Brown and Co. ISBN 978-0-673-39334-0.
- James, Marquis (1933). Andrew Jackson: The Border Captain. New York: Literary Guild.
- James, Marquis (1937). Andrew Jackson: Portrait of a President. New York: Grosset & Dunlap.
- Johnson, Gerald W. (1927). Andrew Jackson, an epic in homespun. New York: Minton, Balch & Company. LCCN 27021314.
- Latner, Richard B. (2002). "Andrew Jackson". In Graff, Henry (ed.). The Presidents: A Reference History (3 ed.). New York: Charles Scribner's Sons. ISBN 978-0-684-31226-2. OCLC 49029341.
- Meacham, Jon (2008). American Lion: Andrew Jackson in the White House. New York: Random House Publishing Group. ISBN 978-0-8129-7346-4.
- Ogg, Frederic Austin (1919). The Reign of Andrew Jackson: A Chronicle of the Frontier in Politics. New Haven: Yale University Press. LCCN 19012621. OCLC 1385488.
- Remini, Robert (1966). Andrew Jackson. New York: HarperCollins.
- Remini, Robert V. (1988). The Life of Andrew Jackson. New York: Harper & Row Publishers, Inc. ISBN 0-0618-0788-5. Abridgment of Remini's 3-volume biography.
- Remini, Robert V. "Andrew Jackson", American National Biography (2000).
- Wilentz, Sean (2005). Andrew Jackson. New York: Henry Holt and Company. ISBN 0-8050-6925-9.

== Biographies, 19th century ==
- Reid, John S.; Eaton, John Henry (1974) [1817]. Owsley, Frank L. Jr. (ed.). The Life of Andrew Jackson (Annotated ed.). Tuscaloosa: University of Alabama Press. ISBN 0-8173-5164-7.
  - Eaton, John H.; Reid, John (1824). The Life of Andrew Jackson, Major-General in the Service of the United States: Comprising a History of the War in the South, from the Commencement of the Creek campaign, to the Termination of the Hostilities before New Orleans. Philadelphia: Samuel F. Bradford.
  - Eaton, John H.; Reid, John; Smith, Jerome V. C. (1885). The Complete Memoirs of Andrew Jackson : Seventh President of the United States; Containing a Full Account of his Military Life and Achievements, with His Career as President. New York: Hurst & Co.
- Ireland, John Robert (1887). History of the Life, Times, and Administration of Andrew Jackson. The republic, or, A history of the United States of America in the administrations. Vol. VII.
- Kendall, Amos (1843). Life of Andrew Jackson: Private, Military, and Civil. New York: Harper & Brothers. ISBN 9780795023637. OCLC 6738380.
- Snelling, William Joseph (1831). A Brief and Impartial History of the Life and Actions of Andrew Jackson. Boston: Stimpson & Clapp. OCLC 6692507.
- Sumner, William Graham (1972) [1882]. American Statesman: Andrew Jackson. New York, NY: AMS Press Inc. ISBN 0-404-50867-7.

== Militia and military ==
Resources for Jackson and the Tennessee militia, U.S. Army, War of 1812, Creek Wars, Seminole Wars, Blackhawk War, etc.

- Blackmon, Richard D. (2014). The U.S. Army Campaigns of the War of 1812: The Creek War, 1813–1814. Washington, D.C.: United States Army Center of Military History. CMH Pub 74-4, GPO S/N: 008-029-00577-8.
- Greene, Jerome (2010). "The New Orleans Campaign of 1814–1815 and the Chalmette Battlefield". In Birkedal, Ted (ed.). Search for the Lost Riverfront: Historical and Archeological Investigations at the Chalmette Battlefield, Jean Lafitte National Historical Park and Preserve. U.S. National Park Service. LCCN 2010443479. OCLC 1014291708. This article incorporates text from this source, which is in the public domain.
- Goodpasture, Albert V. (1896). "Andrew Jackson, Tennessee and the Union". The American Historical Magazine. 1 (3): 209–223. ISSN 2333-8970. - future national politicians who served in Jackson's militia during 1812/Creek war
- Heidler, David Stephen; Heidler, Jeanne T. (2003). Old Hickory's war: Andrew Jackson and the quest for empire. Baton Rouge: Louisiana State University Press. ISBN 978-0-8071-2867-1.
- Kanon, Tom (2014). Tennesseans at War, 1812–1815: Andrew Jackson, the Creek War, and the Battle of New Orleans. University of Alabama Press. ISBN 9780817318291. LCCN 2013049815.
- McLemore, Laura Lyons, ed. (2016). The Battle of New Orleans in History and Memory. Baton Rouge, LA: LSU Press. ISBN 978-0807-16467-9.
- Owsley, Frank L. Jr. (2000) [1981]. Struggle for the Gulf Borderlands: the Creek War and the Battle of New Orleans, 1812–1815. Tuscaloosa: University of Alabama Press. ISBN 978-0-8173-1062-2.
- Ratner, Lorman A. Andrew Jackson and His Tennessee Lieutenants: A Study in Political Culture (1997).
- Remini, Robert V. (2001) [1999]. The Battle of New Orleans: Andrew Jackson and America's First Military Victory. London, UK: Penguin Books. ISBN 978-1101-19997-8.
- Rowland, Dunbar (1926). Andrew Jackson's Campaign against the British, or, the Mississippi Territory in the War of 1812, concerning the Military Operations of the Americans, Creek Indians, British, and Spanish, 1813–1815. New York: MacMillan Company.
- Sesquicentennial Celebration Commission (1966). Battle of New Orleans Sesquicentennial Celebration, 1815–1965: Final Report to the United States Congress. Washington, D.C.: U.S. G.P.O.
- Tregle, Joseph G. Jr. (Winter 1981). "Andrew Jackson and the Continuing Battle of New Orleans". Journal of the Early Republic. 1 (4): 373–393. doi:10.2307/3122827.
- Turnbow, Tony (2018). Hardened to Hickory: The Missing Chapter in Andrew Jackson's Life. n.pub. ISBN 978-0-692-08752-7. - Natchez Expedition
- Warshauer, Matthew (1998). "The Battle of New Orleans Reconsidered: Andrew Jackson and Martial Law". Louisiana History: The Journal of the Louisiana Historical Association. 39 (3): 261–291. ISSN 0024-6816.
- Watson, Samuel J. (2012). Jackson's sword: the Army officer corps on the American frontier, 1810–1821. Modern War Studies. Lawrence: University Press of Kansas. ISBN 978-0-7006-1884-2. LCCN 2012027879. OCLC 788282695.
- ——— (2013). Peacekeepers and conquerors: the Army Officer Corps on the American frontier, 1821–1846. Modern War Studies. Lawrence: University Press of Kansas. ISBN 978-0-7006-1915-3. LCCN 2012049027. OCLC 818143738.
- Williams, Samuel C. (January 1925). "A Forgotten Campaign". Tennessee Historical Magazine. VIII (4). Tennessee Historical Society: 266–276. ISSN 2333-9012. JSTOR 42637505. OCLC 2451052.

== Tribal treaties, Indian wars, Indigenous policy ==
- Akers, Donna (2004). Living in the Land of Death: the Choctaw Nation, 1830–1860. Native American Series. East Lansing: Michigan State University Press. ISBN 978-0-87013-684-9.
- Atkinson, James R. (2010). Splendid Land, Splendid People: The Chickasaw Indians to Removal. Tuscaloosa: University of Alabama Press. ISBN 978-0-8173-8337-4.
- Barnett, James F. (2012). "Chapter 6: 1801–1837, Treaties and Removal". Mississippi's American Indians. Heritage of Mississippi. University Press of Mississippi. doi:10.14325/mississippi/9781617032455.003.0007. ISBN 978-1-61703-245-5. JSTOR j.ctt24hws3. LCCN 2011041573. OCLC 785240442. Project MUSE book 86318.
- Belko, W. Stephen, ed. (2011). America's hundred years' war: U.S. expansion to the Gulf Coast and the fate of the Seminole, 1763–1858. Gainesville: University Press of Florida. ISBN 978-0-8130-3525-3. OCLC 567162410.
- Berutti, Ronald A. (1992). "The Cherokee Cases: The Fight to Save the Supreme Court and the Cherokee Indians". American Indian Law Review. 17 (1): 291–308. doi:10.2307/20068726.
- Braden, Guy B. (September 1958). "The Colberts and the Chickasaw Nation". Tennessee Historical Quarterly. 17 (3): 222–249. ISSN 0040-3261. JSTOR 42621386. & Braden, Guy B. (December 1958). "The Colberts and the Chickasaw Nation (Continued)". Tennessee Historical Quarterly. 17 (4): 318–335. JSTOR 42621397.
- Braund, Kathryn E. Holland, ed. (2012). Tohopeka: Rethinking the Creek War and the War of 1812. Tuscalosa, Alabama: University of Alabama Press. ISBN 978-0-8173-5711-5.
- Carson, James Taylor (2008). "'The Obituary of Nations': Ethnic Cleansing, Memory, and the Origins of the Old South". Southern Cultures. 14 (4): 6–31. ISSN 1068-8218. JSTOR 26391777.
- Cave, Alfred A. (2017). Sharp Knife: Andrew Jackson and the American Indians. Native America: yesterday and today. Santa Barbara, California: Praeger, an imprint of ABC-CLIO, LLC. ISBN 978-1-4408-6039-3.
- Cave, Alfred A. (2003). "Abuse of Power: Andrew Jackson and the Indian Removal Act of 1830". Historian. 65 (6): 1330–1353. doi:10.1111/j.0018-2370.2003.00055.x. S2CID 144157296.
- Cozzens, Peter (2023). A brutal reckoning: Andrew Jackson, the Creek Indians, and the epic war for the American South. New York: Alfred A. Knopf. ISBN 978-0-525-65945-7.
- Cumfer, Cynthia (2007). Separate peoples, one land: The minds of Cherokees, Blacks, and Whites on the Tennessee frontier. Chapel Hill, NC: University of North Carolina Press. ISBN 978-0-8078-3151-9.
- DeRosier, Arthur H. (May 1967). "Andrew Jackson and Negotiations for The Removal of the Choctaw Indians". The Historian. 29 (3): 343–362. ISSN 0018-2370.
- Dunbar-Ortiz, Roxanne (2014). "The Last of the Mohicans and Andrew Jackson's White Republic". An indigenous peoples' history of the United States. ReVisioning American history. Boston: Beacon Press. ISBN 978-0-8070-5783-4.
- Ellisor, John T. (2010). The Second Creek War: Interethnic Conflict and Collusion on a Collapsing Frontier. Indians of the Southeast. University of Nebraska Press. ISBN 978-0-8032-2548-0.
- Garrison, Tim Allen (2002). The Legal Ideology of Removal: The Southern Judiciary and the Sovereignty of Native American Nations. Athens, GA: University of Georgia Press. ISBN 0-8203-3417-0.
- Haveman, Christopher D. (2016). Rivers of Sand: Creek Indian Emigration, Relocation, and Ethnic Cleansing in the American South. Indians of the Southeast. Lincoln, Nebraska: University of Nebraska Press. ISBN 978-0-8032-7392-4. LCCN 2015008315.
- Hays, Joel Stanford (2013). "Twisting the Law: Legal Inconsistencies in Andrew Jackson's Treatment of Native-American Sovereignty and State Sovereignty". Journal of Southern Legal History. 21: 157.
- Henderson, T. R. (July 2014). "The Destruction of Littafuchee, and a Brief History of American Settlement". Alabama Review. 67 (3). Alabama Historical Association. University of Alabama Press: 233–253. doi:10.1353/ala.2014.0028. ISSN 2166-9961. OCLC 1007553588. Project MUSE 552367.
- Hoig, Stan (1999). The Cherokees and Their Chiefs: In the Wake of Empire. University of Arkansas Press. doi:10.1353/book.124501. ISBN 978-1-61075-096-7.
- Holland, James Wendell (1968). Andrew Jackson and the Creek War: Victory at the Horseshoe. University of Alabama Press. ISBN 0817351019.
- Inskeep, Steve (2015). Jacksonland: President Andrew Jackson, Cherokee Chief John Ross, and a Great American Land Grab. London, UK: Penguin Books. ISBN 978-1101-61777-9.
- Jahoda, Gloria (1975). The Trail of Tears: The Story of the American Indian Removals 1813–1855. New York: Holt, Rinehart and Winston. ISBN 0-03-014871-5.
- Mann, Barbara Alice (2009). The Tainted Gift: The Disease Method of Frontier Expansion. ABC-CLIO. p. 20. ISBN 9780313353383.
- Mann, Barbara Alice (2019). President by Massacre: Indian-Killing for Political Gain. ABC-CLIO.
- McLoughlin, William Gerald (1986). Cherokee Renascence in the New Republic (ebook ed.). Princeton, N.J.: Princeton University Press. ISBN 978-0-691-04741-6. JSTOR j.ctv39x611. LCCN 86042843. OCLC 13859438. OL 2129522W. Project MUSE book 61052.
- Nichols, David A. (2001). "Land, Republicanism, and Indians: Power and Policy in Early National Georgia, 1780–1825". The Georgia Historical Quarterly. 85 (2): 199–226. ISSN 0016-8297. JSTOR 40584408. - background of Cherokee removal
- Ostler, Jeffrey (2019). Surviving Genocide: Native Nations and the United States from the American Revolution to Bleeding Kansas. New Haven, Connecticut: Yale University Press. doi:10.12987/9780300245264. ISBN 978-0-300-24526-4.
- Prucha, Francis Paul (1969). "Andrew Jackson's Indian policy: a reassessment". Journal of American History. 56 (3): 527–539. doi:10.2307/1904204. JSTOR 1904204.
- Remini, Robert V. (2001). Andrew Jackson and His Indian Wars. London, UK: Penguin Books. ISBN 0-7861-8568-6.
- Rosen, Deborah A. (2015). Border Law: The First Seminole War and American Nationhood. Harvard University Press. doi:10.4159/9780674425699. ISBN 978-0-674-42569-9. LCCN 2014030726. OCLC 906025995.
- Satz, Ronald N. (1974). American Indian Policy in the Jacksonian Era. Lincoln: University of Nebraska Press. ISBN 978-0-8032-0823-0. LCCN 73094119. OCLC 922558. OL 6215460W.
- Saunt, Claudio (September 2019). "Financing Dispossession: Stocks, Bonds, and the Deportation of Native Peoples in the Antebellum United States". The Journal of American History. 106 (2): 315–337. doi:10.1093/jahist/jaz344. ISSN 0021-8723. JSTOR 48552369.
- Saunt, Claudio (2020). Unworthy Republic: The Dispossession of Native Americans and the Road to Indian Territory. New York: W. W. Norton & Company. ISBN 978-0-393-60984-4. LCCN 2019050502. OCLC 1102470806.
- Snyder, Christina (2017). "Andrew Jackson's Indian Son: Native Captives and American Empire". In Garrison, Tim Alan; O'Brien, Greg (eds.). The Native South: New Histories and Enduring Legacies. Lincoln, Nebraska: University of Nebraska Press. pp. 84–106. doi:10.2307/j.ctt1q1xq7h.9. ISBN 978-0-8032-9690-9. JSTOR j.ctt1q1xq7h.9.
- Waselkov, Gregory A. (2006). A Conquering Spirit: Fort Mims and the Redstick War of 1813–1814. Tuscaloosa: University of Alabama Press. ISBN 978-0-8173-1491-0.
- Washburn, Jeffrey D. (2020). Labor In The Field Is Much Changed: The Chickasaws and the Civilization Plan, 1790–1837 (Thesis). University of Mississippi.
- Wright, J. Leitch (1968). "A Note on the First Seminole War as Seen by the Indians, Negroes, and Their British Advisers". The Journal of Southern History. 34 (4): 565–575. doi:10.2307/2204387. ISSN 0022-4642. JSTOR 2204387.

== Bank War ==
- Bogart, Ernest Ludlow (1907). The Economic History of the United States. London, UK: Longmans, Green, and Company. p. 219.
- Campbell, Stephen W. (2019). The Bank War and the Partisan Press: Newspapers, Financial Institutions, and the Post Office in Jacksonian America. Lawrence, KS: University Press of Kansas. ISBN 9780700627448. OCLC 1066117752.
- Grynaviski, Jeffery D. (November 25, 2006), Rethinking Jackson's Bank War: Party Politics and American Monetary (PDF), University of Chicago
- Hammond, Bray (1947). "Jackson, Biddle, and the Bank of the United States". The Journal of Economic History. 7 (1): 1–23. ISSN 0022-0507.
- Hammond, Bray (1988) [1957]. Banks and Politics in America from the Revolution to the Civil War. Princeton, NJ: Princeton University Press. ISBN 0691005532. OCLC 890993.
- Kahan, Paul (2016). The Bank War: Andrew Jackson, Nicholas Biddle, and the Fight for American Finance. Yardley, PA: Westholme Publishing LLC. ISBN 978-1594-16234-3.
- McFaul, John M. (1972). The Politics of Jacksonian Finance. Ithaca, NY: Cornell University Press. ISBN 9780801407383. OCLC 409631.
- Remini, Robert V. (1967). Andrew Jackson and the Bank War: A Study in the Growth of Presidential Power. New York, NY: W. W. Norton & Company. ISBN 978-0393-09757-3.
- Rockoff, Hugh T. (1971). "33. Money, Prices and Banks in the Jacksonian Era". In Fogel, Robert William; Engerman, Stanley L. (eds.). The reinterpretation of American economic history. New York: Harper & Row. ISBN 978-0-06-042109-0.
- Scheiber, Harry N. (1963). "The Pet Banks in Jacksonian Politics and Finance, 1833–1841". The Journal of Economic History. 23 (2): 196–214. ISSN 0022-0507.
- Sellers, Charles (1991). The Market Revolution: Jacksonian America, 1815-1846. New York, NY: Oxford University Press. ISBN 978-0195-03889-7.
- Taylor, George Rogers, ed. (1949). Jackson versus Biddle: the struggle over the second Bank of the United States. Problems in American Civilization. Boston: Heath. LCCN 59042020. OCLC 279688. OL 4779215W. - excerpts from primary and secondary sources
- Temin, Peter (1969). The Jacksonian economy. A Norton essay in American history. New York: Norton. ISBN 978-0-393-09841-9.
- Walton, Gary M.; Rockoff, Hugh (2018). History of the American economy (13th ed.). Boston: Cengage Learning. ISBN 978-1-337-10460-9.

== Presidential cabinet ==
- Govan, Thomas P. (November 1939). "John M. Berrien and the Administration of Andrew Jackson". The Journal of Southern History. 5 (4): 447. doi:10.2307/2191827.
- Kennedy, Kathleen; Ullman, Sharon Rena (2003). Sexual Borderlands: Constructing an American Sexual Past. Columbus, OH: Ohio State University Press. ISBN 978-0-8142-0927-1.
- Marszalek, John F. (2000) [1997]. The Petticoat Affair: Manners, Mutiny, and Sex in Andrew Jackson's White House. Baton Rouge, LA: LSU Press. ISBN 0-8071-2634-9.
- McCrary, Royce C.; Ingham, S. D. (1976). ""The Long Agony Is Nearly over": Samuel D. Ingham Reports on the Dissolution of Andrew Jackson's First Cabinet". The Pennsylvania Magazine of History and Biography. 100 (2): 231–242. ISSN 0031-4587. JSTOR 20091054.

== Presidential campaigns ==
- Boller, Paul F. Jr. (2004). Presidential Campaigns: From George Washington to George W. Bush. New York: Oxford University Press. ISBN 0-19516-716-3.
- Cheathem, Mark R. (2018). The Coming of Democracy: Presidential Campaigning in the Age of Jackson. Baltimore, Md.: Johns Hopkins University Press. ISBN 9781421425993.
- Gammon, Samuel Rhea Jr. (1922). The Presidential Campaign of 1832. Johns Hopkins University Studies in Historical and Political Science, Series XL, No. 1. Baltimore: Johns Hopkins University. hdl:loc.gdc/scd0001.00118963155. LCCN 22023206. OCLC 2309286.
- Heidler, Jeanne T.; Heidler, David S. (2018). The Rise of Andrew Jackson: Myth, Manipulation, and the Making of Modern Politics. New York: Basic Books. ISBN 978-0-465-09756-2. LCCN 2018015938. OCLC 1056909422.
- Hollander, Craig B. (2022). "Corrupt Bargaining: Partisan Politics, the Election of 1824, and the Suppression of the African Slave Trade". Journal of the Early Republic. 42 (3): 359–387. ISSN 0275-1275.
- Miles, Edwin A. (1968). "The Whig Party and the Menace of Caesar". Tennessee Historical Quarterly. 27 (4): 361–379. ISSN 0040-3261. JSTOR 42623042.
- Parsons, Lynn H. The Birth of Modern Politics: Andrew Jackson, John Quincy Adams, and the Election of 1828 (2009) excerpt and text search
- Ratcliffe, Donald (2021). The One-Party Presidential Contest: Adams, Jackson, and 1824's Five-Horse Race. University Press of Kansas. ISBN 978-0-7006-3247-3.
- Remini, Robert V. (1963). The Election of Andrew Jackson. Baltimore, MD: Lippincott.
- Stephens, Rachel (2018). Selling Andrew Jackson: Ralph E.W. Earl and the politics of portraiture. Columbia, South Carolina: University of South Carolina Press. ISBN 978-1-61117-867-8.
- Smith, Culver H., "Propaganda Technique in the Jackson Campaign of 1828," East Tennessee Historical Society Publication, No. 6, 1934.

== Slavery, abolitionism, racism ==
- Drew, Bettina (2014). "The Great Amnesia". Southwest Review. 99 (4): 556–569. ISSN 0038-4712. JSTOR 43473416.
- Cheathem, Mark R. (2011). "Andrew Jackson, Slavery, and Historians" (PDF). History Compass. 9 (4): 326–338. doi:10.1111/j.1478-0542.2011.00763.x.
- ——— (October 2011). Slavery, Kinship, and Andrew Jackson's Presidential Campaign of 1828 (PDF). Southern Historical Association Annual Meeting. jacksonianamerica.com. Archived (PDF) from the original on August 22, 2024.
- ——— (October 2012). The Evolution of the Enslaved Community at Andrew Jackson's Plantations, 1790s–1840s (PDF). 2012 BrANCH (Association of British American Nineteenth Century Historians). jacksonianamerica.com.
- Dickey, Jeff (2022). The republic of violence: the tormented rise of abolition in Andrew Jackson's America. New York, NY: Pegasus Books. ISBN 978-1-64313-928-9.
- Goldstein, Alyosha (December 2014). "Possessive Investment: Indian Removals and the Affective Entitlements of Whiteness". American Quarterly. 66 (4). The Johns Hopkins University Press: 1077–1084. doi:10.1353/aq.2014.0075. ISSN 0003-0678. JSTOR 43823185. SSRN 2510643.
- Henig, Gerald S. (Spring 1969). "The Jacksonian Attitude Toward Abolitionism in the 1830's". Tennessee Historical Quarterly. 28 (1). Tennessee Historical Society: 42–56. ISSN 0040-3261.
- Hyslop, Stephen G. (2023). Building a House Divided: Slavery, Westward Expansion, and the Roots of the Civil War. University of Oklahoma Press. ISBN 9780806192734. LCCN 2023002890.
- Lovett, Bobby L. (1999). The African-American history of Nashville, Tennessee, 1780–1930: elites and dilemmas. Black community studies. Fayetteville: University of Arkansas Press. ISBN 978-1-55728-556-0. LCCN 98053915.
- Mercieca, Jennifer Rose (2007). "The Culture of Honor: How Slaveholders Responded to the Abolitionist Mail Crisis of 1835". Rhetoric and Public Affairs. 10 (1): 51–76. doi:10.1353/rap.2007.0027. hdl:1969.1/188838. ISSN 1094-8392. JSTOR 41940117.
- Opal, J. M. (October 2013). "General Jackson's Passports: Natural Rights and Sovereign Citizens in the Political Thought of Andrew Jackson, 1780s–1820s". Studies in American Political Development. 27 (2): 69–85. doi:10.1017/S0898588X13000060. ISSN 0898-588X.
- Remini, Robert V. (Summer 1991). "Andrew Jackson's Adventures on the Natchez Trace". Southern Quarterly. 29 (4). Hattiesburg, Mississippi: University of Southern Mississippi: 35–42. ISSN 0038-4496. OCLC 1644229.
- ——— (Spring 1995). "Andrew Jackson Takes an Oath of Allegiance to Spain". Tennessee Historical Quarterly. 54 (1). Loyalty oath document surfaced by Dr. G. Douglas Inglis of Seville, Spain. Nashville, Tennessee: Tennessee Historical Society: 2–15. ISSN 0040-3261. JSTOR 42628387. OCLC 551288487.
- Rothman, Adam (2005). Slave Country: American Expansion and the Origins of the Deep South. Harvard University Press. doi:10.4159/9780674042919. ISBN 978-0-674-04291-9. LCCN 2004057658. OCLC 56191767.
- Serme, Jean-Marc (2003). "Stormy Weather at Andrew Jackson's Halcyon Plantation, in Coahoma County, Mississippi, 1838–1845". Revue française d'études américaines (98): 32–47. doi:10.3917/rfea.098.0032. ISSN 0397-7870. JSTOR 20874927.
- Snow, Whitney Adrienne (2008). "Slave Owner, Slave Trader, Gentleman: Slavery and the Rise of Andrew Jackson". Journal of East Tennessee History. 80. Knoxville, Tennessee: East Tennessee Historical Society: 47–59. ISSN 1058-2126. OCLC 23044540.
- Walker, Anders (August 2024). "What Happened to Nancy Jackson? A Riddle of Race and Resistance on the Southern Frontier". Law and History Review. 42 (3): 521–537. doi:10.1017/S0738248024000294. ISSN 0738-2480.
- Warshauer, Matthew (2006). "Andrew Jackson: Chivalric Slave Master". Tennessee Historical Quarterly. 65 (3): 203–229. ISSN 0040-3261. JSTOR 42627964.

== Land speculation, land policy, territorial expansion ==
- Anderson, Nicholas D. (2025). "Inadvertent Expansion in the American South: The United States". Inadvertent Expansion: How Peripheral Agents Shape World Politics. Ithaca: Cornell University Press. pp. 47–69. doi:10.1353/book.126582. ISBN 9781501779480. OCLC 1446551436.
- Bradley, Jared W. (1972). "W.C.C. Claiborne and Spain: Foreign Affairs under Jefferson and Madison, 1801-1811". Louisiana History: The Journal of the Louisiana Historical Association. 13 (1): 5–26. ISSN 0024-6816.
- Chappell, Gordon T. (November 1949). "Some Patterns of Land Speculation in the Old Southwest". The Journal of Southern History. 15 (4): 463. doi:10.2307/2198383.
- Doherty, Herbert J.; Jackson, Andrew (1955). "Andrew Jackson's Cronies in Florida Territorial Politics: With Three Unpublished Letters to His Cronies". The Florida Historical Quarterly. 34 (1): 3–29. ISSN 0015-4113. JSTOR 30139730. - "the land office faction"
- Downing, Marvin (1983). "John Christmas McLemore: 19th Century Tennessee Land Speculator". Tennessee Historical Quarterly. 42 (3): 254–265. ISSN 0040-3261.
- Farr, Jason (November 30, 2016). The Glasgow Land Fraud and the Emergence of Andrew Jackson, 1783–1803 (Thesis). University of Virginia. doi:10.18130/v38k6x.
- Feller, Daniel (1984). The public lands in Jacksonian politics. Madison: University of Wisconsin Press. ISBN 978-0-299-09850-6.
- Finger, John R. (2001). Tennessee Frontiers: Three Regions in Transition. A History of the Trans-Appalachian Frontier. Bloomington: Indiana University Press. ISBN 978-0-253-10872-2. LCCN 2001001387. OCLC 50174763.
- Frymer, Paul (2014). ""A Rush and a Push and the Land Is Ours": Territorial Expansion, Land Policy, and U.S. State Formation". Perspectives on Politics. 12 (1): 119–144. doi:10.1017/S1537592713003745. ISSN 1537-5927. JSTOR 43281105.
- Inman, Natalie R. (2017). Brothers and Friends: Kinship in Early America. Early American Spaces. Athens, Georgia: University of Georgia Press. doi:10.1353/book51901. ISBN 978-0-8203-5110-0. LCCN 2016055415. OCLC 985105661.
- Inskeep, Steve (2015). Jacksonland: President Andrew Jackson, Cherokee Chief John Ross, and a great American land grab. New York, New York: Penguin Press. ISBN 978-1-59420-556-9. LCCN 2015300789. OCLC 894026161.
- Kastor, Peter J. (October 2001). ""Motives of Peculiar Urgency": Local Diplomacy in Louisiana, 1803–1821". The William and Mary Quarterly. 58 (4): 819. doi:10.2307/2674501.
- Koonts, Russell S. (1995). ""An Angel has fallen!": The Glasgow Land Frauds and the Emergence of the North Carolina Supreme Court". The North Carolina Historical Review. 72 (3): 301–328. ISSN 0029-2494. JSTOR 23521613.
- Laska, Lewis L. (1995). ""The Dam'st Situation Ever Man Was Placed In": Andrew Jackson, David Allison, and the Frontier Economy of 1795–96". Tennessee Historical Quarterly. 54 (4): 336–347. ISSN 0040-3261. JSTOR 42627231.
- Marks, Henry (April 1973). "Andrew Jackson's Activities in the Tennessee Valley". Huntsville Historical Review. 3 (2) 4: 27–36 – via M. Louis Salmon Library, University of Alabama at Huntsville.
- McGovern, James R., ed. (1974). Andrew Jackson and Pensacola. The Pensacola Series Commemorating the American Revolution Bicentennial, Vol. II. Pensacola–Escambia County Development Commission, University of West Florida, Pensacola News-Journal (Rev. ed.). Pensacola, Florida: Tom White the Printer. LCCN 73090201. OCLC 1512958.
- McNeill, Sarah Grace (1956). "Andrew Jackson and Texas Affairs, 1820–1845". East Tennessee Historical Society's Publications. 28. Tennessee Historical Commission, University of Tennessee. Knoxville, Tennessee: East Tennessee Historical Society: 86–101. ISSN 0361-6193. OCLC 1137265. FHL 1345572.
- Miles, Edwin A. (1958). "Andrew Jackson and Senator George Poindexter". The Journal of Southern History. 24 (1): 51–66. doi:10.2307/2955285. ISSN 0022-4642. JSTOR 2955285. - fight over land office appointment
- Nichols, Robert (February 2018). "Theft Is Property! The Recursive Logic of Dispossession". Political Theory. 46 (1): 3–28. doi:10.1177/0090591717701709. ISSN 0090-5917.
- Rice, Turner (1975a). "Andrew Jackson and His Northwest Alabama Interests". Journal of Muscle Shoals History. 3. University of North Alabama. Florence, Alabama: Tennessee Valley Historical Society: 3–12. ISSN 0094-8039. LCCN 74646773. OCLC 1795446.
- Rohrbough, Malcolm J. (1968). The Land Office Business: The Settlement and Administration of American Public Lands, 1789–1837. London: Oxford University Press. LCCN 68029725. OCLC 176589.
- Shire, Laurel Clark; Knetsch, Joe (Fall 2017). "Ambivalence in the Settler Colonial Present: The Legacies of Jacksonian Expansion" (PDF). Tennessee Historical Quarterly. 76 (3): 258–275. ISSN 0040-3261. JSTOR 26540292.
- Van Alstyne, Richard W. (1972). "The American Empire Makes Its Bow on the World Stage, 1803–1845". In Williams, William Appleman (ed.). From colony to empire: essays in the history of American foreign relations. New York: J. Wiley. ISBN 978-0-471-94685-4.
- Walker, Arda (1943). "Andrew Jackson; Planter". The East Tennessee Historical Society's Publications. 15: 19–34. ISSN 0361-6193. LCCN 29013045. OCLC 39989616. FHL 1345525.
- Williams, S. Cole (1930). Beginnings of West Tennessee, in the land of the Chickasaws, 1541–1841. Johnson City, Tennessee: The Watauga Press.
- Wren, Dustin (May 1, 2021). Through the Wilderness: Andrew Jackson's Military Road and the Settlement of the Southern Frontier (Thesis). Missouri State.
- Young, Mary E. (1958). "Indian Removal and Land Allotment: The Civilized Tribes and Jacksonian Justice". The American Historical Review. 64 (1): 31–45. doi:10.2307/1844855. ISSN 0002-8762. JSTOR 1844855.

== State and territorial politics ==
- Doherty, Herbert J. Jr. (1954). "The Governorship of Andrew Jackson". Florida Historical Quarterly. 33 (1) 4: 3–29.
- Finger, John R. (2001). Tennessee Frontiers: Three Regions in Transition. A History of the Trans-Appalachian Frontier. Bloomington: Indiana University Press. ISBN 978-0-253-10872-2. LCCN 2001001387. OCLC 50174763.
- Menarchek, Matthew (December 2019). Origins of Jacksonian Political Economy in Tennessee, 1768–1830 (Thesis). University of Tennessee, Knoxville.
- Miles, Edwin Arthur (1960). Jacksonian Democracy in Mississippi. University of North Carolina Press.
- Moore, Powell (January 1932). "The Political Background of the Revolt Against Jackson in Tennessee". East Tennessee Historical Society's Publications. 28. Tennessee Historical Commission, University of Tennessee. Knoxville, Tennessee: East Tennessee Historical Society: 45–66. ISSN 0361-6193. OCLC 1137265. FHL 1640746.
- Murphy, James Edward (1971). "Jackson and the Tennessee Opposition". Tennessee Historical Quarterly. 30 (1): 50–69. ISSN 0040-3261. JSTOR 42623203.
- Sellers, Charles G. (June 1954). "Banking and Politics in Jackson's Tennessee, 1817–1827". The Mississippi Valley Historical Review. 41 (1): 61–84. doi:10.2307/1898150.
- Shockley, Megan Taylor (1997). "King of the Wild Frontier vs. King Andrew I: Davy Crockett and the Election of 1831". Tennessee Historical Quarterly. 56 (3): 158–169. ISSN 0040-3261. JSTOR 42627359.
- Satterfield, R. Beeler (1967). "The Uncertain Trumpet of the Tennessee Jacksonians". Tennessee Historical Quarterly. 26 (1). Tennessee Historical Society: 79–96. ISSN 0040-3261.

== Kinship networks, personal life, biographical dictionaries ==
Note: There are extensive family tree charts in volume one of The Papers, volume one of Remini, in Rogin (1976), and in Cheathem (October 2011). Part IV of the Legal Papers of A. Jackson also includes capsule biographies of many early-career affiliates.

- Basch, Norma (December 1993). "Marriage, Morals, and Politics in the Election of 1828". The Journal of American History. 80 (3): 890–918. doi:10.2307/2080408. ISSN 0021-8723. JSTOR 2080408.
- Bradley, James W., ed. (2002). Interim Appointment: W.C.C. Claiborne Letter Book, 1804–1805. The Louisiana Purchase Collection. LSU Press. ISBN 978-0-8071-2684-4. LCCN 2001004234. OCLC 47746051. - bios of associates
- Cheathem, Mark R. (2007). Old Hickory's Nephew: The Political and Private Struggles of Andrew Jackson Donelson. Southern Biography Series. Baton Rouge: Louisiana State University Press. ISBN 978-0-8071-3238-8. LCCN 2006024951. OCLC 70866891. Project MUSE book 16672.
- DeWitt, John H. (1931). "Andrew Jackson and His Ward, Andrew Jackson Hutchings: A History Hitherto Unpublished". Tennessee Historical Magazine. 1 (2): 83–106. ISSN 2333-9012. JSTOR 42638062.
- Dur, Philip F. (Winter 1974). "The Cafferys of Louisiana". Revue de Louisiane (Louisiana Review). 3 (2). Lafayette, Louisiana: Council for the Development of French in Louisiana: 63–79. ISSN 0273-267X. OCLC 1886710.
- Farrell, W. E. (2007). "Andrew Jackson 7th President of the United States and the Jacksons of Ballybay 1803–1824". Clogher Record. 19 (2/3): 202–238. doi:10.2307/27699566. JSTOR 27699566.
- Galloway, Linda Bennett (1950). "Andrew Jackson, Junior". Tennessee Historical Quarterly. 9 (3): 195–216. ISSN 0040-3261. JSTOR 42621045.
- Gismondi, Melissa (June 12, 2017). Rachel Jackson and the Search for Zion, 1760s–1830s (PhD, History thesis). Charlottesville, Virginia: University of Virginia. doi:10.18130/v3q364.
- Goff, Reda C. (1969). "A Physical Profile of Andrew Jackson". Tennessee Historical Quarterly. 28 (3): 297–309. ISSN 0040-3261. JSTOR 42623096.
- Gullan, Harold I. (2004). First fathers: the men who inspired our Presidents. Hoboken, NJ: John Wiley & Sons. ISBN 0-471-46597-6.
- Hardeman, Nicholas Perkins (1977). Wilderness Calling: The Hardeman Family in the American Westward Movement, 1750–1900. Knoxville, Tennessee: University of Tennessee Press. ISBN 978-0-87049-194-8. LCCN 76000980. OCLC 2005980 – via Internet Archive.
- Inman, Natalie R. (2017). "4. The Donelsons: Social, Political, and Economic Expansion on the Frontier". Brothers and Friends: Kinship in Early America. Early American Spaces. University of Georgia Press. doi:10.1353/book51901. ISBN 978-0-8203-5110-0. LCCN 2016055415. OCLC 985105661.
- Jackson, Elmer Martin (1985). Keeping the lamp of remembrance lighted: a genealogical narrative with pictures and charts about the Jacksons and their allied families. Hagerstown, MD: Hagerstown Bookbinding and Printing Co.
- Meredith, Rachel (May 2013). "There Was Somebody Always Dying and Leaving Jackson as Guardian": The Wards of Andrew Jackson (M.A. History thesis). Murfreesboro, Tennessee: Middle Tennessee State University. ProQuest 1538368.
- Nelson, Anson (Summer 2015). "Distinguished Nashville Masons of 1818 [orig. pub. 1869]" (PDF). Middle Tennessee Journal of Genealogy & History. XXIX (1): 30–33.
- Owsley, Harriet Chappell (1977). "The Marriages of Rachel Donelson". Tennessee Historical Quarterly. 36 (4). Nashville, Tennessee: Tennessee Historical Society: 479–492. ISSN 0040-3261. JSTOR 42625784. OCLC 551288487.
- Owsley, Harriet Chappell (1982). "Andrew Jackson and His Ward, Andrew Jackson Donelson". Tennessee Historical Quarterly. 41 (2): 124–139. ISSN 0040-3261. JSTOR 42626276.
- Peterson, Dawn (2017). "5. Adoption in Andrew Jackson's Empire". Indians in the Family: Adoption and the Politics of Antebellum Expansion. Harvard University Press. doi:10.4159/9780674978720. ISBN 978-0-674-97872-0.
- Plater, David D. (2015). The Butlers of Iberville Parish, Louisiana: Dunboyne Plantation in the 1800s. Baton Rouge: Louisiana State University Press. ISBN 978-0-8071-6128-9. Project MUSE book 48467.
- Spence, Richard Douglas (2010). "Samuel Donelson: Young Andrew Jackson's Best Friend". Tennessee Historical Quarterly. 69 (2). Tennessee Historical Society: 106–123. ISSN 0040-3261. JSTOR 42628170.
- Spence, Richard Douglas (2023). Daniel Smith Donelson: soldier, politician, Tennessean. Knoxville: University of Tennessee Press. ISBN 978-1-62190-740-4.
- Toplovich, Ann (2005). "Marriage, Mayhem, and Presidential Politics: The Robards–Jackson Backcountry Scandal" (PDF). Ohio Valley History. 5 (4). Cincinnati, Ohio & Louisville, Kentucky: Cincinnati Museum Center & Filson Historical Society: 3–22. ISSN 2377-0600. OCLC 1332991166. Project MUSE 572973.
- White, Robert H. (1935). "Elizabeth Hutchinson Jackson, the Mother of President Andrew Jackson". Tennessee Historical Magazine. 3 (3). Tennessee Historical Society: 179–184. ISSN 2333-9012.

== Law, judges, courts ==
- Brown, Steven Preston (2012). John McKinley and the Antebellum Supreme Court: Circuit Riding in the Old Southwest. John McKinley. Alabama: University of Alabama Press. ISBN 978-0-8173-1771-3.
- Newmyer, R. Kent (2006). The Supreme Court under Marshall and Taney. The American history series (2nd ed.). Wheeling, Ill: Harlan Davidson. ISBN 978-0-88295-241-3.
- Opal, J. M. (2017). Avenging the People: Andrew Jackson, the Rule of Law, and the American Nation. New York: Oxford University Press. ISBN 978-0-19-975170-9. LCCN 2016044301. OCLC 960030315.
- Schwartz, Bernard (1993). A History of the Supreme Court. New York: Oxford University Press. ISBN 978-0195-09387-2.
- Warshauer, Matthew (2006). Andrew Jackson and the Politics of Martial Law. Knoxville, TN: University of Tennessee Press. ISBN 978-1572-33624-7.

== Other specialized studies ==
- Adams, Henry (1986) [1891]. History of the United States of America During the Administrations of James Madison. New York: Library Classics of the United States. ISBN 0-9404-5035-6.
- Baptist, Edward E. (2014). The Half has Never Been Told: Slavery and the Making of American Capitalism. New York, NY: Basic Books. ISBN 978-04650-0296-2.
- Bates, Christopher G. (2015). The Early Republic and Antebellum America: An Encyclopedia of Social, Political, Cultural, and Economic History. New York: Routledge. ISBN 9781317457404.
- Belohlavek, John M. (1985). "Let the eagle soar!": the foreign policy of Andrew Jackson. Lincoln: Univ. of Nebraska Press. ISBN 978-0-8032-1187-2.
- Binder, Frederick M. (1968). The Color Problem in Early National America as Viewed by John Adams, Jefferson and Jackson. Studies in American History VII. The Hague, Netherlands: Mouton & Co., N.V. LCCN 68017871. OCLC 426813.
- Bugg Jr. James L. ed. Jacksonian Democracy: Myth or Reality? (1952), excerpts from scholars.
- Burstein, Andrew (2003). The Passions of Andrew Jackson. New York: Vintage Publishing. ISBN 0-3757-1404-9.
- Byrne, James Patrick; Coleman, Philip; King, Jason Francis (2008). Ireland and the Americas: Culture, Politics, and History : a Multidisciplinary Encyclopedia. Santa Barbara, CA: ABC-CLIO. ISBN 9781851096145.
- Cheathem, Mark R. (2011). The Shape of Democracy: Historical Interpretations of Jacksonian Democracy, in The Age of Andrew Jackson, Brian D. McKnight and James S. Humphreys, eds.
- Cheathem, Mark R., and Terry Corps, eds. Historical Dictionary of the Jacksonian Era and Manifest Destiny (Rowman & Littlefield, 2016).
- Durham, Walter T. (1990). Before Tennessee: the Southwest Territory, 1790–1796: a narrative history of the Territory of the United States South of the River Ohio. Piney Flats, TN: Rocky Mount Historical Association. ISBN 0-9678-3071-0.
- Eaton, Clement (1942). "Mob Violence in the Old South". The Mississippi Valley Historical Review. 29 (3): 351–370. doi:10.2307/1897915. ISSN 0161-391X. JSTOR 1897915.
- Ellis, Richard E. (1974). Woodward, C. Vann (ed.). Responses of the Presidents to Charges of Misconduct. New York: Delacorte Press. pp. 61–68. ISBN 0-440-05923-2.
- Gannett, Henry (1905). The Origin of Certain Place Names in the United States. Washington, D.C.: Myron E. Sharpe, Inc. p. 167.
- Goldman, Perry M. (1970). "Political Rhetoric in the Age of Jackson". Tennessee Historical Quarterly. 29 (4): 360–371. ISSN 0040-3261. JSTOR 42623183.
- Hofstadter, Richard (1989) [1948]. The American Political Tradition: And the Men Who Made It. New York, NY: Vintage Books. ISBN 978-0679-72315-8. Chapter on Jackson.
- Holt, Michael F. (1999). The Rise and Fall of the American Whig Party: Jacksonian Politics and the Onset of the Civil War. Oxford University Press. doi:10.1093/acprof:oso/9780195161045.001.0001. ISBN 978-0-19-516104-5. LCCN 98027020. OCLC 39354222.
- Howe, Daniel Walker (2007). What Hath God Wrought: the Transformation of America, 1815–1848. Oxford, NY: Oxford University Press. ISBN 9780199743797.
- Jackson, Carlton (1966). "The Internal Improvement Vetoes of Andrew Jackson". Tennessee Historical Quarterly. 25 (3): 261–279. ISSN 0040-3261.
- Lansford, Tom; Woods, Thomas E., eds. (2008). Exploring American History: From Colonial Times to 1877. Vol. 10. New York: Marshall Cavendish. p. 1046. ISBN 978-0-7614-7758-7.
- Latner Richard B. The Presidency of Andrew Jackson: White House Politics, 1820–1837 (1979), standard survey.
- Leeden, Michael A. (2001). Tocqueville on American Character. New York: Macmillan. ISBN 0-3122-5231-5.
- Lewis, J. D. (2012). NC Patriots 1775–1783: Their Own Words. Vol. 1 – The NC Continental Line. Little River, SC: J.D. Lewis. pp. 193–94. ISBN 978-1-4675-4808-3.
- Lynn, Joshua A. (2019). Preserving the white man's republic: Jacksonian democracy, race, and the transformation of American conservatism. A nation divided. Charlottesville: University of Virginia Press. ISBN 978-0-8139-4250-6.
- Martin, François-Xavier (1829). The History of Louisiana, from the Earliest Period. Vol. 2. New Orleans, LA: A.T. Penniman & Co.
- Morgan, William G. (1968). "Henry Clay's Biographers and the "Corrupt Bargain" Charge". The Register of the Kentucky Historical Society. 66 (3): 242–258. ISSN 0023-0243. JSTOR 23376844.
- Morgan, William G. (1967). "John Quincy Adams Versus Andrew Jackson: Their Biographers And The "Corrupt Bargain" Charge". Tennessee Historical Quarterly. 26 (1): 43–58. ISSN 0040-3261. JSTOR 42622916.
- Mueller, Ken (2014). Senator Benton and the People: Master Race Democracy on the Early American Frontier. Early American Places. Ithaca, New York: Cornell University Press. ISBN 9781501757556. OCLC 1203952026. Project MUSE book 83601.
- Nevins, Allan; Commanger, Henry Steele; Morris, Jeffrey (1992) [1941]. A Pocket History of the United States. New York: Simon & Schuster. ISBN 9780671790233.
- Nowlan, Robert A. (2012). The American Presidents, Washington to Tyler. Jefferson, NC: McFarland Publishing. ISBN 978-0786463367.
- Ogg, Frederic Austin (1919). The Reign of Andrew Jackson; Vol. 20, Chronicles of America Series. New Haven, CT: Yale University Press.
- Remini, Robert V. (1988). The Legacy of Andrew Jackson: Essays on Democracy, Indian Removal, and Slavery. Baton Rouge, Louisiana: Louisiana State University Press. ISBN 0-8071-1642-4.
- Rice, Mark (n.d.). "Defending the ramparts: the United States Military Academy's struggle for survival in the age of Jackson". usmalibrary.contentdm.oclc.org.
- Rorabaugh, W.J.; Critchlow, Donald T.; Baker, Paula C. (2004). America's Promise: A Concise History of the United States. Lanham, MD: Rowman & Littlefield. ISBN 0-7425-1189-8.
- Rutland, Robert Allen (1995). The Democrats: From Jefferson to Clinton. Columbia, MO: University of Missouri Press. ISBN 0-8262-1034-1.
- Sabato, Larry; O'Connor, Karen (2002). American Government: Continuity and Change. New York: Pearson Longman. ISBN 978-0-321-31711-7.
- Schama, Simon. The American Future: A History (2008).
- Schlesinger, Arthur M. (1988) [1945]. The Age of Jackson. Boston, MA: Little, Brown and Company. ISBN 9780316773430. Winner of Pulitzer Prize for History. History of ideas of the era.
- Syrett, Harold Coffin (1971) [1953]. Andrew Jackson: his contribution to the American tradition. Makers of the American tradition series. Indianapolis: Bobbs-Merrill. ISBN 978-0-8371-5802-0. - on Jacksonian democracy and/or political opportunism
- Walker, Arda (1943). "Andrew Jackson; Planter". The East Tennessee Historical Society's Publications. 15: 19–34. ISSN 0361-6193. LCCN 29013045. OCLC 39989616. FHL 1345525.
- Wilentz, Sean (2006). The Rise of American Democracy: Jefferson to Lincoln. New York: W.W. Norton & Company, Inc. ISBN 0-393-05820-4.
- Wyatt-Brown, Bertram (1997). "Andrew Jackson's Honor". Journal of the Early Republic. 17 (1): 1–36. doi:10.2307/3124641. ISSN 0275-1275. JSTOR 3124641.
- Zinn, Howard (1980). "7: As Long As Grass Grows or Water Runs". A People's History of the United States. Abingdon-on-Thames, UK: Routledge Taylor and Francis Group.

== Encyclopedias ==
- Heidler, David Stephen; Jeanne T. Heidler, eds. (1997). Encyclopedia of the War of 1812. Annapolis, Maryland: Naval Institute Press. ISBN 1-59114-362-4.
- Olson, James Stuart (2002). Robert L. Shadle (ed.). Encyclopedia of the Industrial Revolution in America. Westport, CT: Greenwood Press. ISBN 0-313-30830-6.
- Paletta, Lu Ann; Worth, Fred L. (1988). The World Almanac of Presidential Facts. New York, NY: World Almanac Books. ISBN 0-345-34888-5.

== Historiography, bibliography, literature reviews ==
- Adams, Sean Patrick, ed. (2013). A Companion to the Era of Andrew Jackson. Hoboken, New Jersey: John Wiley & Sons.
- Cheathem, Mark R. (2019). "The Stubborn Mythology of Andrew Jackson". Reviews in American History. 47 (3): 342–348. doi:10.1353/rah.2019.0062. ISSN 1080-6628.
- Cole, Donald B. (September 1985). "Honoring Andrew Jackson Before All Other Living Men". Reviews in American History. 13 (3). Baltimore, Maryland: The Johns Hopkins University Press: 359–366. doi:10.2307/2702090. ISSN 0048-7511. JSTOR 2702090.
- Curtis, James C. (1976). Andrew Jackson and the Search for Vindication. Boston: Little, Brown and Co.
- Eriksson, Erik McKinley (January 1925). "Official Newspaper Organs and the Campaign of 1828". Tennessee Historical Magazine. 8 (4): 231–247. ISSN 2333-9012.
- Eriksson, Erik McKinley (March 1937). "President Jackson's Propaganda Agencies". Pacific Historical Review. 6 (1). Arthur H. Clark Co., Glendale, California. University of California Press: 47–57. doi:10.2307/3634106. ISSN 0030-8684. JSTOR 3634106. OCLC 45954834.
- Holladay, Robert (2010). "Antebellum Tennessee Historiography: A Critical Appraisal". Tennessee Historical Quarterly. 69 (3). Tennessee Historical Society: 224–241. ISSN 0040-3261.
- Harmon, Robert B. (July 1992). "Presidents and the West: A bibliographic essay". Journal of the West. 31 (3): 90–109.
- Mabry, Donald J., Short Book Bibliography on Andrew Jackson, Historical Text Archive.
- Remini, Robert V. and Robert O. Rupp. Andrew Jackson: A Bibliography (Greenwood, 1991)
- Sellers, Charles Grier Jr. (1958). "Andrew Jackson versus the Historians". Mississippi Valley Historical Review. 44 (4): 615–634. doi:10.2307/1886599. JSTOR 1886599.
- Somit, Albert (1948). "Andrew Jackson: Legend and Reality". Tennessee Historical Quarterly. 7 (4): 291–313. ISSN 0040-3261.
- Van Sledright, Bruce, and Peter Afflerbach. "Reconstructing Andrew Jackson: Prospective elementary teachers' readings of revisionist history texts". Theory & Research in Social Education 28#3 (2000): 411–444.
- Ward, John William (1955). Andrew Jackson, Symbol for an Age. Oxford University Press. - how writers saw him.
- n.a. (1985). "Background Books: The Age of Jackson". The Wilson Quarterly. 9 (4): 134–135. ISSN 0363-3276. JSTOR 40256931.

== Papers and correspondence ==
- Jackson, Andrew (1926–1935). Bassett, John Spencer; Jameson, J. Franklin (eds.). The Correspondence of Andrew Jackson. Vol. 5. Washington, D.C.: Carnegie Institute of Washington. OCLC 2533564. 7 volumes total. - HathiTrust - Internet Archive - Google Books
  - Vol 1. Up to April 30, 1814
  - Vol 2. May 1, 1814 – December 31, 1819
  - Vol 3. 1820–1828
  - Vol 4. 1829–1832
  - Vol 5. 1833–1838
  - Vol 6. 1839–1845
  - Vol 7. General index, by David Maydole Matteson
- Jackson, Andrew. Smith, Sam B.; Owlsey, Harriet Chappell; Feller, Dan; Moser, Harold D. (eds.). The Papers of Andrew Jackson. Knoxville, TN: University of Tennessee Press. OCLC 5029597.
  - Vol. I: 1770–1803
  - Vol. II: 1804–1813
  - Vol. III: 1814–1815
  - Vol. IV: 1816–1820
  - Vol. V: 1821–1824
  - Vol. VI: 1825–1828
  - Vol. VII: 1829
  - Vol. VIII: 1830
  - Vol. IX: 1831
  - Vol. X: 1832
  - Vol. XI: 1833
  - Vol. XII: 1834
- Ely, James W. Jr.; Brown, Theodore Jr., eds. (1987). Legal Papers of Andrew Jackson. Supplement to the Papers of Andrew Jackson. Knoxville, Tennessee: University of Tennessee Press. ISBN 978-0-87049-355-3. LCCN 82002635. OCLC 17590211.
- Richardson, James D., ed. (1897). Compilation of the Messages and Papers of the Presidents. Washington, D.C.: Bureau of National Literature and Art. OCLC 980191506. Reprints his major messages and reports.
- Library of Congress. "Andrew Jackson Papers", a digital archive that provides direct access to the manuscript images of many of the Jackson documents. online
  - Library of Congress Manuscript Division (1967), Index to the Andrew Jackson Papers (PDF), Presidents' Papers Index Series, Washington, D.C.: U.S. Government Printing Office, hdl:loc.gdc/gdclccn.67060014, LCCN 67060014 – Key to the organization system for microfilm reels/scans of the primary source documents
- "Letters of Application and Recommendation During the Administration of Andrew Jackson, 1829–1837". Washington, D.C.: National Archives and Records Service. 1968.

== Theses ==
- Drew, Bettina Lee (December 2001). Master Andrew Jackson: Indian Removal and the Culture of Slavery (Thesis). Yale University. UMI 3030759. ProQuest 3030759
- Lewis, Monte Ross (December 1981). Chickasaw Removal: Betrayal of the Beloved Warriors, 1794–1844 (Thesis). Denton, Texas: North Texas State University.
- Menarchek, Matthew (2019). Origins of Jacksonian Political Economy in Tennessee, 1768–1830 (Thesis). University of Tennessee.
- Power, Jessica Sarah (July 15, 2024). The Occupation of Pensacola: Slavery and Sovereignty in the Nineteenth-Century Gulf World (Thesis). Vanderbilt University.
- Ray, Jonathan (2014). Andrew Jackson and the Indians, 1767–1815 (Thesis). Tuscaloosa: University of Alabama.
- Smith, Trevor A. "Pioneers, Patriots, and Politicians: The Tennessee Militia System, 1772–1857." University of Tennessee, 2003.
- Wallace, Charles (2016). "Dread of Elder Titles": John Haywood and the Occult Origins of the Confederacy (Thesis). Williamsburg, Virginia: College of William & Mary. doi:10.21220/S2F597. - intellectual rationale for Indian removal, et al.

== See also ==
- Portraits of Andrew Jackson
- Bibliography of the Burr conspiracy
- Bibliography of slavery in the United States
