= Frederic Austin Ogg =

American political scientist (1878–1951)

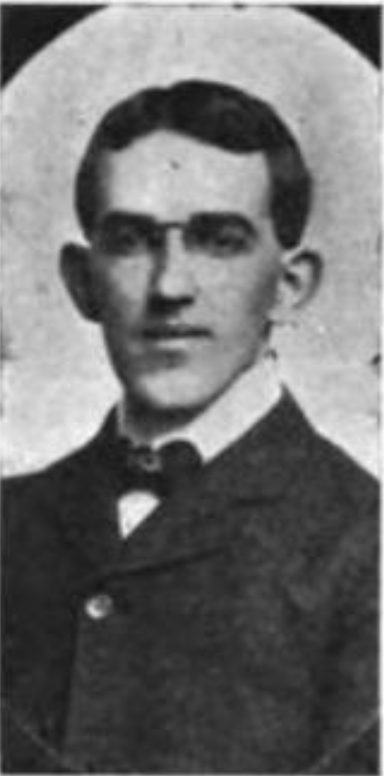
Ogg in 1906

Frederic Austin Ogg (February 8, 1878 – October 23, 1951) was an American political scientist.

== Biography ==
Ogg was born at Solsberry, Indiana, in 1878. He graduated from DePauw University (Ph.B., 1899) and took post graduate courses at Indiana (A.M., 1900) and Harvard (A.M. in history, 1904, and Ph.D. in history, 1908) universities. After several years spent in teaching in high schools and colleges, he became associate professor of political science at the University of Wisconsin in 1914, and full professor in 1917. He was chair of the department of Political Science from 1925 to 1939.

He was a member of many economic and historical societies. He was editor of the American Political Science Review from 1926 to 1949. He was president of the American Political Science Association from 1940 to 1941.

He and Emma Virginia Perry were married in 1903.

== Works ==
His literary work gave him a national reputation. He wrote for popular magazines and authored 17 books. Among his works were:

- Saxon and Slav (1903)
- The Opening of the Mississippi (1904). Macmillan.
- A Source Book of Mediæval History (1908)
- Social Progress in Contemporary Europe (1912). Macmillan.
- The Governments of Europe (1913). Macmillan.
- Life of Daniel Webster (1914)
- “National Progress 1907–1917” (The American Nation, Vol. 27, 1917)
