= Green Bottom Inn =

Defunct racing venue in Alabama, U.S.

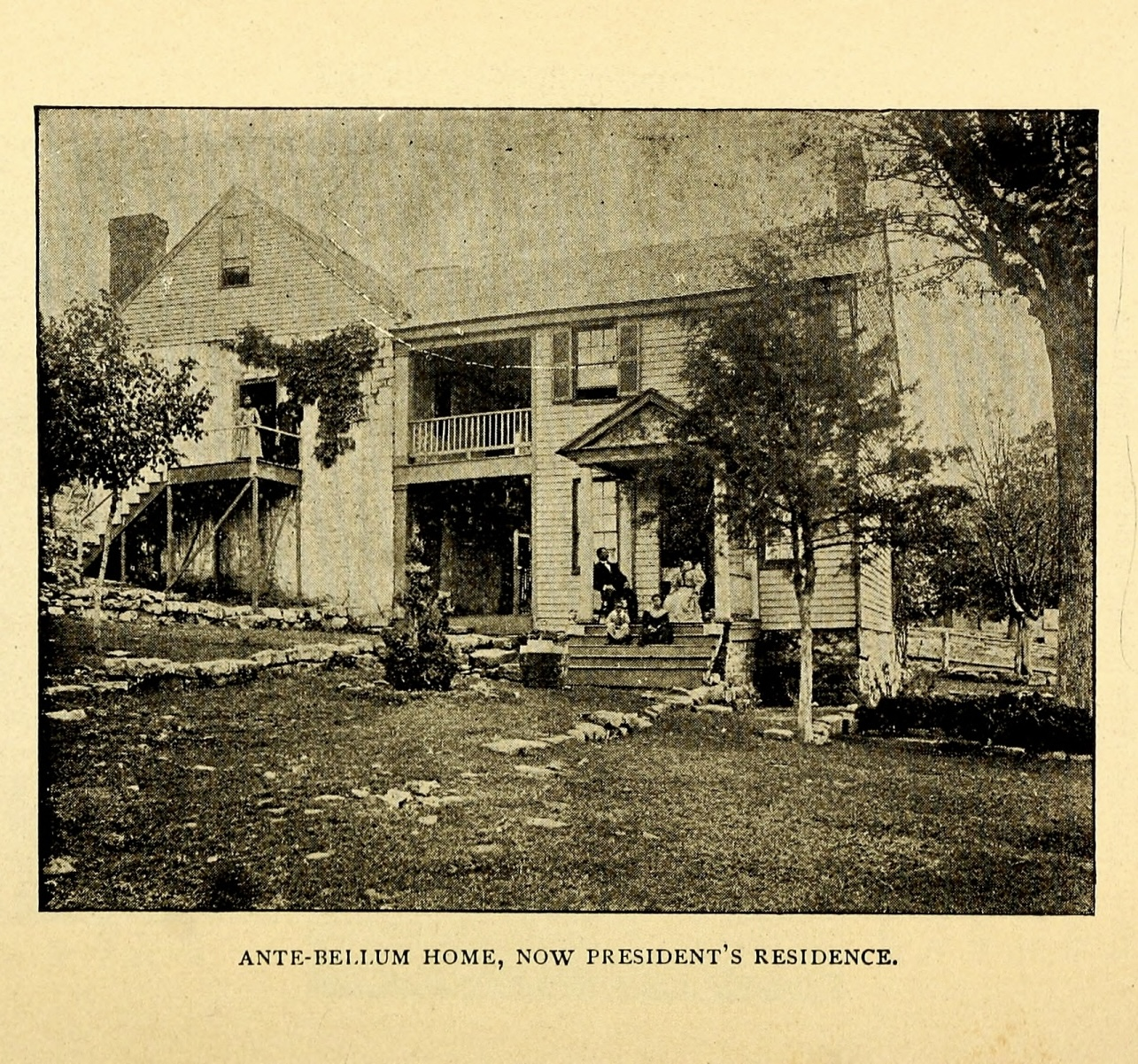
Buildings on the Green Bottom Inn site in Normal, Alabama as of 1902: main residence

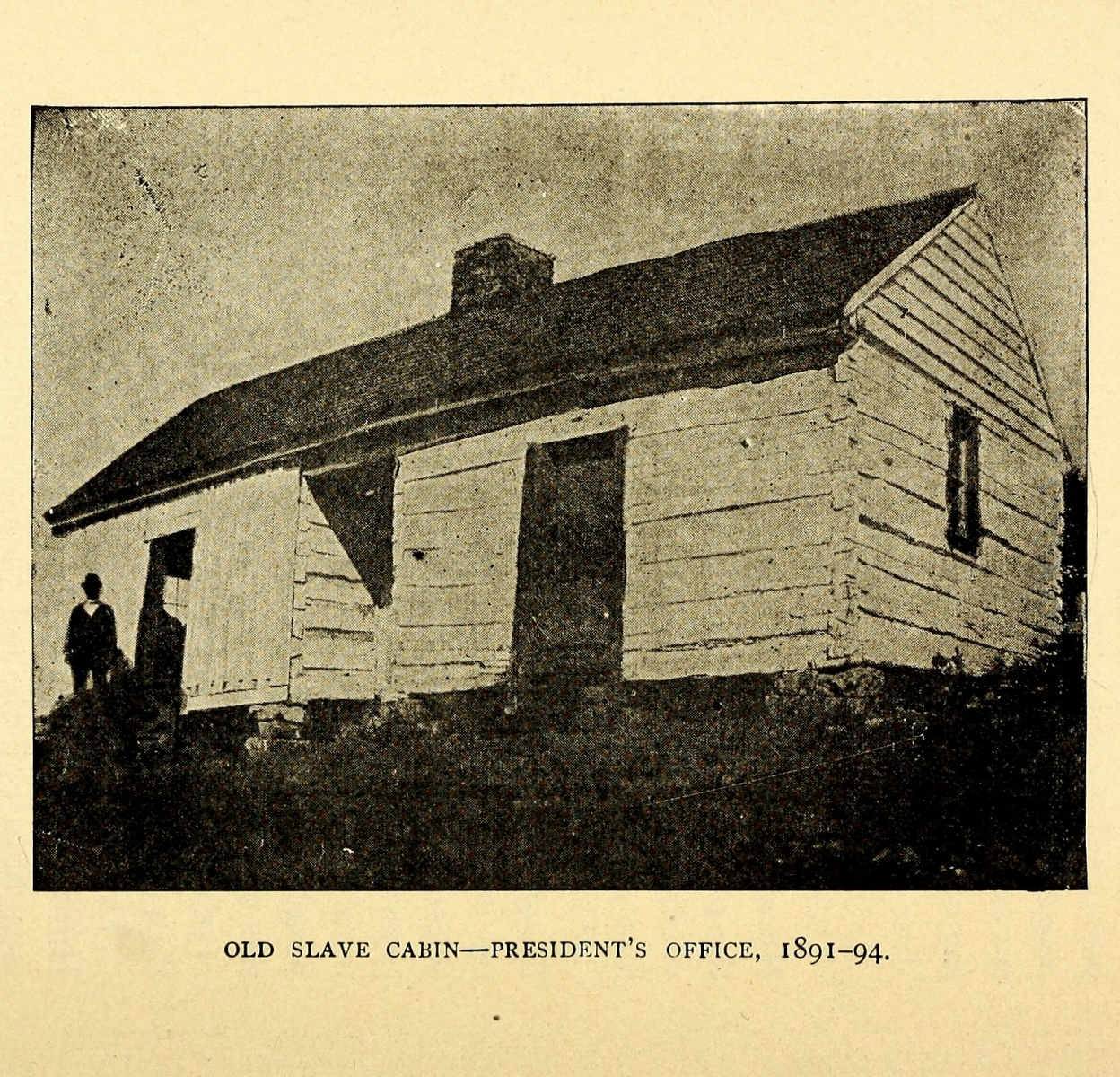
Buildings on the Green Bottom Inn site in Normal, Alabama as of 1902: former slave cabin, one of four surviving at that time

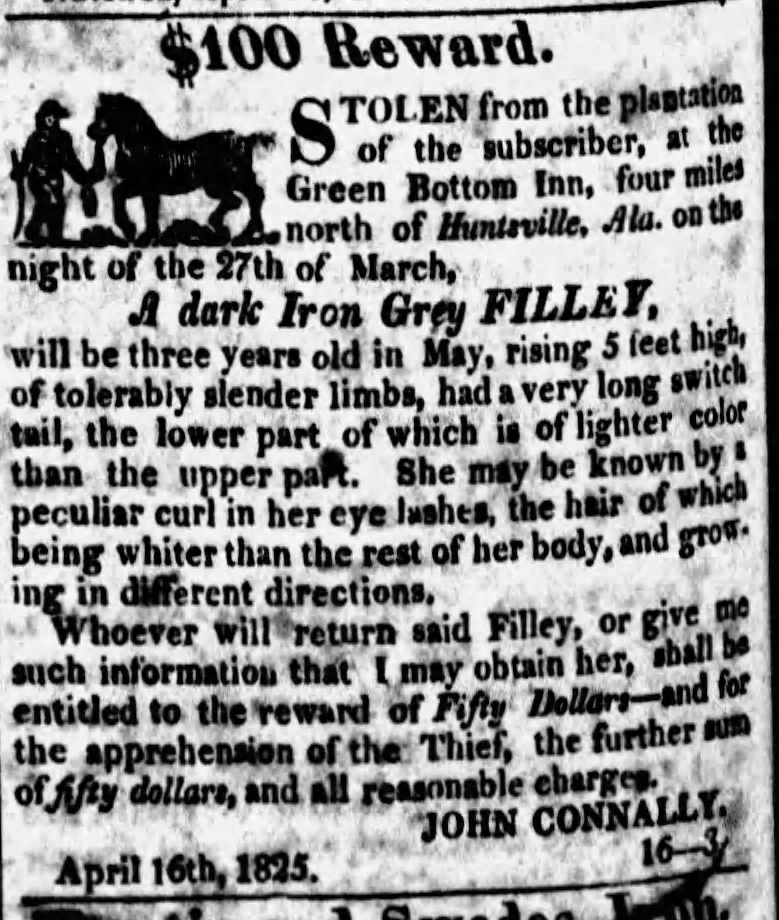
"$100 Reward" Natchez Gazette, April 23, 1825

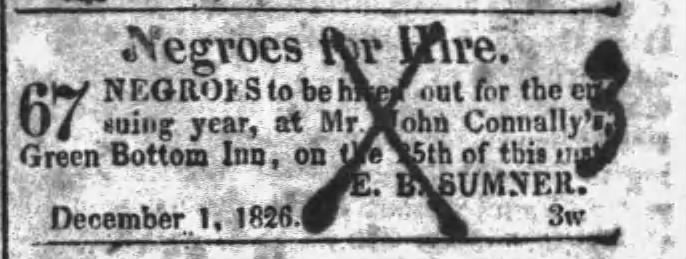
"Negroes for Hire" The Democrat, December 22, 1826

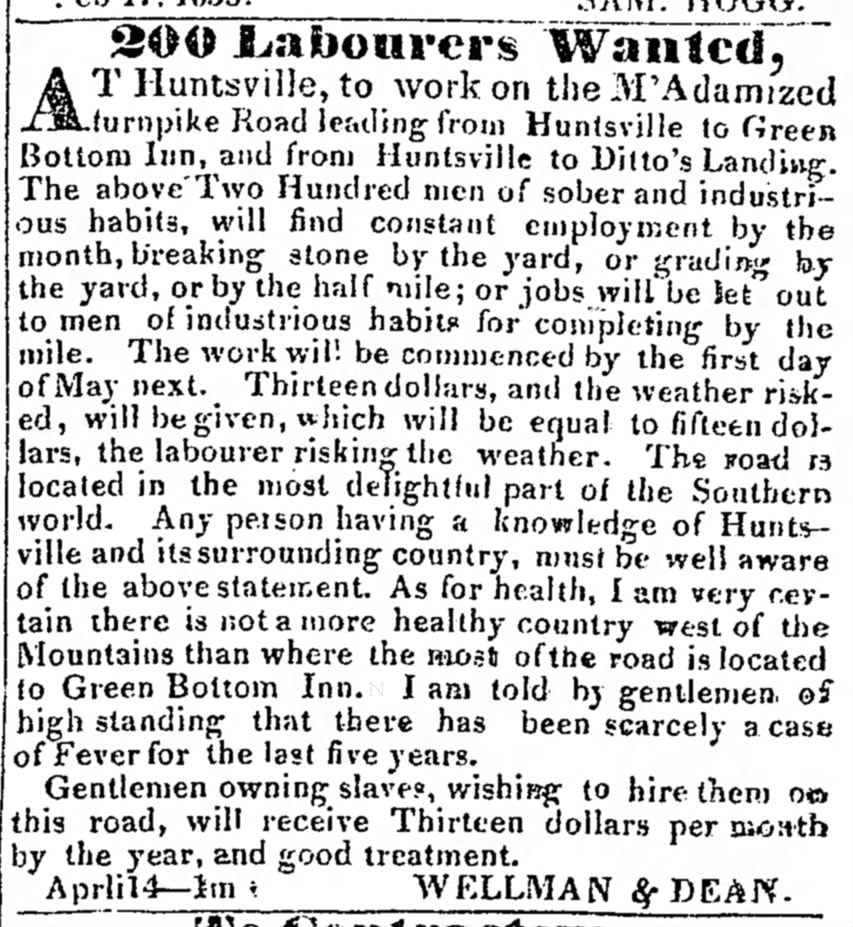
"200 Labourers Wanted" Nashville Republican, May 19, 1835

Green Bottom Inn was an early 19th-century tavern, racetrack, horse market, and slave market in what is now Normal, Alabama, United States, first opened in 1815 in what was then Mississippi Territory by John Connally. The inn was located on a road known as the Meridian Pike (or Meridianville turnpike), outside what is today Huntsville. Connally bought the land at the Alabama land sales of 1809, "on the road leading north from Twickenham Town to Flint River." A commemorative plaque was placed on the site in 1930. The inn building, made in part from locally quarried stone, later became part of the campus of Alabama A&M University until it burned down in February 1931.

== History ==
Set atop a small hill, John Connally's tavern had seven porches and a fireplace that could hold a whole ox for roasting if need be. It had its own spring, stables for horses, and cabins for the enslaved. The stables were run and the horses managed by a man of color named James Conley. According to an account published at the time of the 1931 fire: "The Inn, itself, contained only two large rooms, one of which served as an office and the other as the bar...Sleeping quarters were provided by a number of one-room buildings on the premises and it was the custom in that day and time to sleep as many men in one room as the room could accommodate." According to a 1902 history of the educational progress of African Americans:

"There once stood upon these grounds a famous inn, a large distillery, grog-shop, slave cabins, rows of stables in which were kept the great trotting horses of 50 years ago, while in the beautiful valley, circling at the foot of the hill, was the race-course, where thousands of dollars were lost and won...Here men, as well as horses, were bought and sold, and often blood was drawn from human veins by the lash like the red wine from bright decanters...The distillery has crumbled to dust. Not a vestige of those stables remain. The old grog-shop, too, has gone forever."

Many of the old Connally-era buildings, however, were converted for the university:

"...the old gin-house, built of logs, where so many slaves trembled at the reckoning evening hour, now used as Normal's blacksmith shop, wheelwright shop, broom factory, mattress factory; the old log barn, repaired, and with additions, serving as Normal's laundry; the little saddle house whose framework is put together entirely with pegs instead of nails, now serves as barber shop; the carriage house, which has served as sewing room and printing office; and last the grand old residence of the 'lord of the manor,' partly of stone (walls 3 ft (0.91 m) thick) and partly of wood covered with cedar shingles, under a heavy coating of moss, containing in all eight rooms."

Some of the stone from the inn was recycled for the construction of Bibb Graves Hall at the university, and the freshwater spring remained accessible as of 1975.

In its heyday, the inn was the site of a popular horse race track, known as Green Bottom Race Track or Green-bottom Turf, which "attracted many politicians and statesmen." Horses that raced there included Grey Gander, Molly Long Legs, Bill Austin, Lady Huntsville, Lady Nashville and Bolivia. Connally was said to have sold Grey Gander for $20,000. Among the men who raced horses there were the early colonizers of Alabama, Andrew Jackson and John Coffee. James Monroe and James K. Polk were also reported to be patrons.

The Green Bottom Inn was also the site of an antebellum horse and slave market. Among the people sold there was William Hooper Councill, who later founded the historically black college or university Alabama A&M near the same spot.

== See also ==
- Horses of Andrew Jackson
- Andrew Jackson and the slave trade in the United States
- Andrew Jackson and land speculation in the United States
- Green Academy
