= Donald B. Cole =

American historian (1922–2013)

- Born: Donald Barnard Cole; March 31, 1922; Lawrence, Massachusetts, U.S.
- Died: October 5, 2013 (aged 91); Exeter, New Hampshire, U.S.
- Occupation: Historian
- Spouse: Susan Wilson
- Children: 4

Academic background
- Education: Phillips Academy; Harvard University

Donald Barnard Cole (March 31, 1922 – October 5, 2013), born in Lawrence, Massachusetts, was professor emeritus at Phillips Exeter Academy, New Hampshire, and the author of books on early American history, including Martin Van Buren and the American Political System and The Presidency of Andrew Jackson.

Cole was married to Susan Wilson, with whom he had four children: Douglas, Robert, Daniel, and Susan. Cole died on October 5, 2013, in Exeter, New Hampshire.

He graduated from Phillips Academy and Harvard University in 1944. He served in the Navy during World War II. He served as a lieutenant on a landing craft in the Pacific Theater, including the invasions of Okinawa and Guam.

== Published works ==
- Immigrant City: Lawrence, Massachusetts, 1845-1921. Chapel Hill, NC: UNC Press, 1963/2002. ISBN 0-8078-5408-5
- Jacksonian Democracy in New Hampshire, 1800-1851. Cambridge, Mass.: Harvard University Press, 1970. ISBN 0-674-46990-9
- A Jackson Man: Amos Kendall and the Rise of American Democracy. Baton Rouge: Louisiana State University Press, 2004. ISBN 0-8071-2930-5
- Martin Van Buren and the American Political System. Princeton, N.J.: Princeton University Press, 1984. ISBN 0-691-04715-4
- The Presidency of Andrew Jackson. Lawrence, Kan.: University Press of Kansas, 1993. ISBN 0-7006-0600-9
- Vindicating Andrew Jackson: The 1828 Election and the Rise of the Two-Party System. Baton Rouge: Louisiana State University Press, 2009. ISBN 978-0-7006-1661-9
- Witness to the Young Republic: A Yankee's Journal, 1828-1870 (with Benjamin B. French & John J. McDonough). Hanover, NH: University Press of New England, 1989. ISBN 0-87451-467-3
