= United States Attorney for the District of Tennessee =

Defunct U.S. federal prosecutor's office

United States Attorney for the District of Tennessee is a defunct United States Attorney's office that served the Southwest Territory and then the state of Tennessee until 1803. The U.S. Attorney for Tennessee was the chief law enforcement officer for the United States District Court for the District of Tennessee. The district was succeeded by the United States Attorney for the Western District of Tennessee and the United States Attorney for the Eastern District of Tennessee.

== Office holders ==
- Andrew Jackson (1790–1797) – the appointment reads "William Blount Governor in and over the Territory of the United States of America South of the River Ohio To all who shall see These Presents Greeting Know ye that I do appoint Andrew Jackson Esquire of the County of Davidson Attorney for and in behalf of the State in the District of Mero and do authorize and impower him to execute and fulfil the duties of that office according to Law and to have and to hold the same with all the Privileges and Emoluments of right appertaining thereto, during his good Behaviour or during the existence of the Temporary Government of the said Territory."
- Thomas Gray (1797–1798)
- William P. Anderson (1798–1802)
- Thomas Stuart (1802–1803)
