= William Henry Sparks =

American lawyer

- Born: January 16, 1800; St Simon's Island, Georgia
- Died: January 13, 1882 (aged 81); Marietta, Georgia
- Occupations: Lawyer, Writer
- Spouse: unknown

William Henry Sparks (January 16, 1800 – January 13, 1882) was an American lawyer and occasional poet famous now only for his autobiographical memoir.

== Life ==
Sparks was born on St. Simon's Island, Georgia, and grew up in Greene County, Georgia. After studying law at Litchfield Law School in Connecticut, he opened a law practice in Greensboro, Georgia. He was elected to the Georgia legislature. By 1830 he moved to Natchez, Mississippi, to raise sugar. From 1852–1861 he had a practice of law in New Orleans, Louisiana, in partnership with Judah P. Benjamin, later a cabinet officer of the Confederate States of America and then a successful attorney in England. Sparks published his autobiographical "The Memories of Fifty Years" in 1870. The work consists of a wide variety of observations Sparks kept note of during his lifetime. Sparks died in Marietta, Georgia, on January 13, 1882.

== Works ==
- The Memories of Fifty Years (1870)
