= Andrew Jackson presidential campaign =

Andrew Jackson, the 7th President of the United States, ran for president twice:

- Andrew Jackson presidential campaign, 1824, the failed campaign Andrew Jackson conducted in 1824
- Andrew Jackson presidential campaign, 1828
