= Charles Dickinson (planter) =

American attorney and duelist (1780–1806)

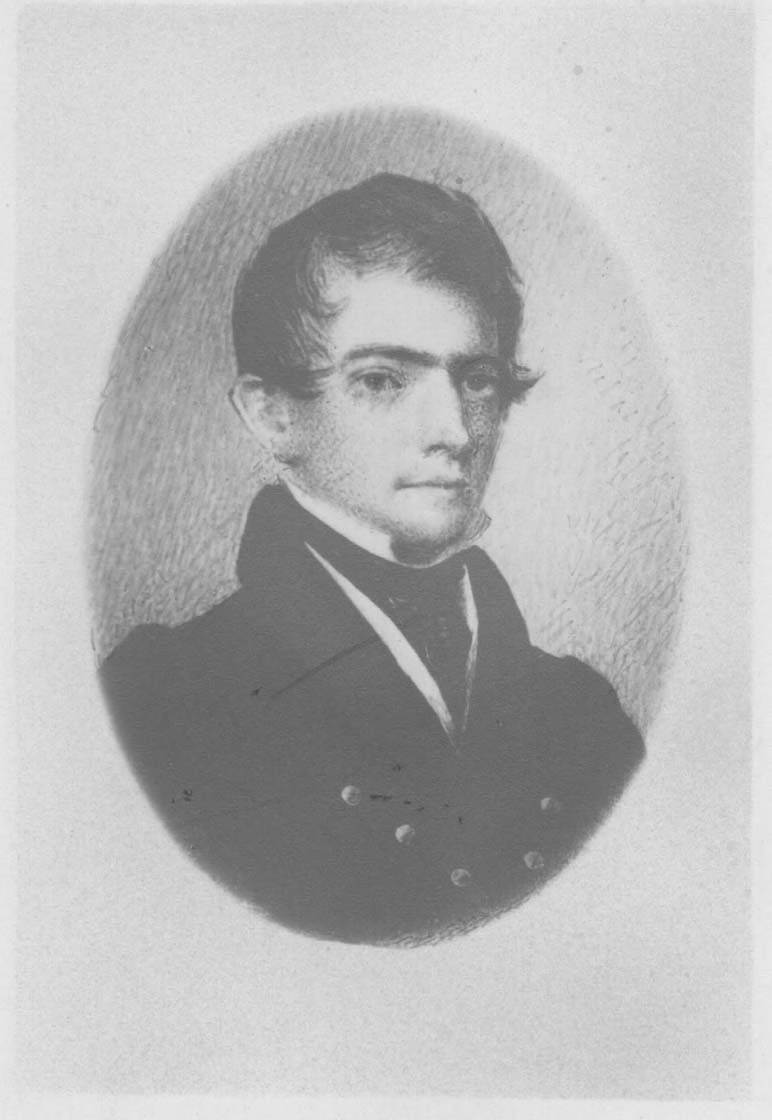
- Miniature of Charles Dickinson by unknown artist
- Born: December 20, 1780; Caroline County, Maryland
- Died: May 30, 1806 (aged 25) near Adairville, Kentucky
- Cause of death: Gunshot wound
- Occupations: attorney, horse breeder and plantation owner
- Known for: being killed in a duel with Andrew Jackson

Charles Dickinson (December 20, 1780 – May 30, 1806) was an American planter, attorney and slave trader. He was killed by future President Andrew Jackson in a duel which wounded both of them. An expert marksman, Dickinson was shot in the chest by Jackson due to a protracted disagreement which originated in an incident involving a horse which the future president owned.

== Early life ==
Dickinson was born at Wiltshire Manor in Caroline County, Maryland, the son of Elizabeth Walker and Henry Dickinson, the grandson of Sophia Richardson and Charles Dickinson (1695–1795), and the great-grandson of Rebecca Wynne (daughter of Thomas Wynne) and John Dickinson. Dickinson's father was the Treasurer of the Eastern Shore 1777–78. Charles Dickinson studied law under U.S. Chief Justice John Marshall, who wrote formal letters of introduction and recommendation for his student.

Dickinson owned a house in Maryland for three years before moving to Tennessee. A history of Caroline County published in 1920 describes Dickinson as "brave and reckless, a trader in blacks and blooded horses, and reputed to be the best shot in the country". According to a blurb in a New Castle, Pennsylvania, newspaper in 1883, Dickinson had a place in Preston, Caroline County, Maryland, but "he sold it in order to embark in negro trading. The old mansion is greatly dilapidated and the farm unproductive." The paper also claimed, most likely erroneously, that Dickinson had been buried in the family cemetery there. An 1882 description of the farm, published in a Denton, Maryland, paper reads, "The dwelling, which is quite large and contains many rooms, is much decayed and badly in need of repairs. The old barn, built and used for a temporary jail in which slaves were confined before being sold south, is a picture of desolation, but still retains in its massive timbers the staples and ringbolts to which many a hapless mother was chained after bidding a last sad farewell to her children before leaving them for ever."

Within two years of his arrival in Tennessee, where he became a successful horse breeder and plantation owner, he courted and married the daughter of Joseph Erwin. (Erwin, like Jackson and Dickinson, was also an interstate slave trader.) Unfortunately for Dickinson, he also ran afoul of Jackson. According to Plantation Life on the Mississippi (1961), "It is probable that [Dickinson] went to Nashville on the invitation of Andrew Jackson. In Maryland's Colonial Eastern Shore, edited by Swepson Earle (1916), it is stated: 'Andrew Jackson, of Tennessee, attending the sessions at Philadelphia of the Fourth Congress as a Representative, and of the Fifth as a Senator, is said to have visited Caroline County, Maryland and to have been a guest at the Daffin home, as well as at others on the Eastern bank of the Chesapeake. Here he made the acquaintance of young Charles Dickinson, whom he successfully urged to move to Tennessee. The sequel to their one-time friendship and business relations, which did not survive the exigencies of Tennessee politics and social life, was the duel on the Red River in Kentucky in which Dickinson fell." The history of Caroline County published in 1920 states "Daffin House in Tuckahoe Neck, built by Thomas Daffin in 1783, was the scene of many social gatherings in its early days. It is said that Andrew Jackson while visiting there met Charles Dickinson, a brother of his hostess, whom he later killed in a duel in Kentucky."

An acquaintance of 10 or more years, then, may be the basis of claims made by Jackson in a letter written after the duel: "...for the present it will only be observed that the deceased, could not be called a Citizen of this state—that he was engaged in the humane persuit of purchasing Negroes in Maryland and carrying them to Natchez & Louisa and thus making a fortune of speculating on human flesh—can it be that because he was engaged in this human trafic, he commands this unusual respect from his honour the Judge, the two Doctors, and the petyfoging lawyer..." Jackson was an interstate slave trader himself.

== Horse race dispute ==
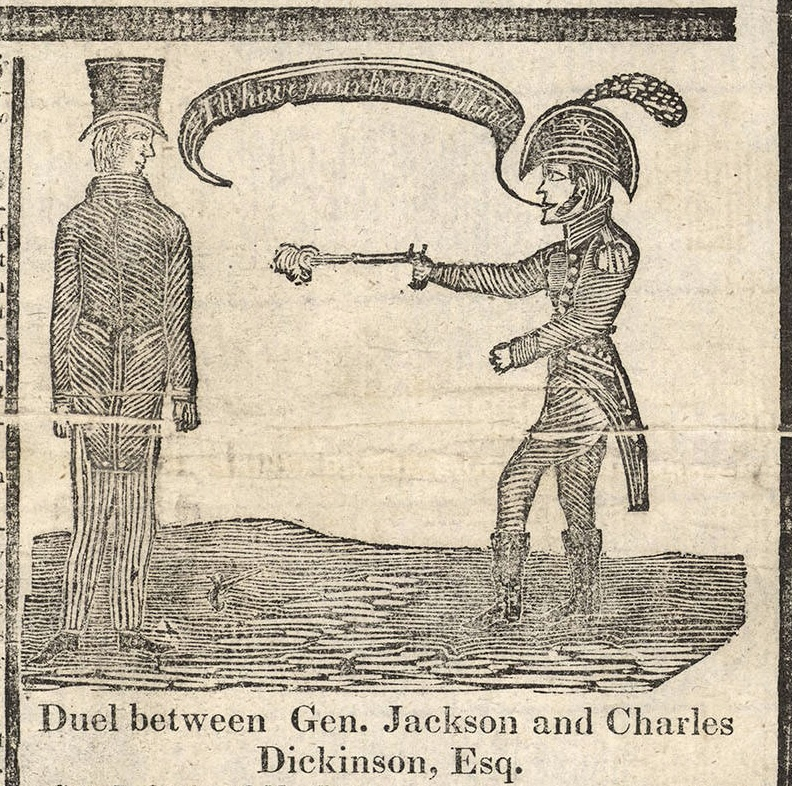
Image of the duel from the Coffin Handbills (TSLA_42992)

In 1805, a friend of Jackson's deprecated the manner in which Captain Erwin had handled a bet with Jackson over a horse race. Erwin's horse, Ploughboy, was scheduled to race Jackson's horse, Truxton; however, Erwin's horse had to drop out of the race. According to the pre-race agreement, if a horse was unable to race, a forfeit fee of $800 (equivalent to $17,200 in 2025) would be paid to the injured party, in this case, Jackson. However, Jackson and Erwin disagreed on how this was to be paid, and a nasty quarrel ensued. Erwin's son-in-law, Charles Dickinson, became enraged and started quarreling with Jackson's friend, which led to Jackson becoming involved. Dickinson wrote to Jackson calling him a "coward and an equivocator". The affair continued, with more insults and misunderstandings, until Dickinson published a statement in the Nashville Review in May 1806, calling Jackson a "worthless scoundrel, ... a poltroon and a coward".

The political atmosphere in Nashville was heated by ambition. John Coffee, a friend of Jackson, had fought a duel earlier in the year with one of Dickinson's associates, and there were larger political and sporting interests involved. The Jackson–Dickinson duel, like that between Aaron Burr—a political friend of Jackson's at the time—and Alexander Hamilton, had been developing over some time.

Although the actual issue that led to the duel was a horse race between Jackson and Dickinson's father-in-law, Joseph Erwin, Jackson had confronted Dickinson over a report that he had insulted his wife, Rachel Jackson. Dickinson said if he had, he was drunk at the time and apologized. Jackson accepted his apology. Jackson and Erwin had scheduled their horse race in 1805. The stakes specified a winning pot of $2,000 (equivalent to $43,000 in 2025) paid by the loser, with an $800 forfeit if a horse could not run. Erwin's horse went lame, and after a minor disagreement about the type of forfeit payment, Erwin paid. The minor disagreement, according to the Caroline County history was related to "notes," a form of payment: "The bet was accepted, and a list of notes made out; but when the time for running arrived, Erwin and Dickinson chose to pay the forfeit. Erwin offered sundry notes not due, withholding the list which was in the hands of Dickinson. Jackson refused to receive them, and demanded the list, claiming the right to select from the notes described upon it. The list was produced, a selection made, and the affair satisfactorily adjusted. Afterwards a rumor reached Dickinson, that General Jackson charged Erwin with producing a list of notes different from the true ones. In an interview between Jackson and Dickinson, the former denied the statement, and the latter gave his author. Jackson instantly proposed to call him in, but Dickinson declined. Meeting with the author shortly after, Jackson had an altercation with him, which ended in blows. Here the affair ought to have ended. But there were those who desired to produce a duel between Jackson and Dickinson..."

As told by Jackson biographer Robert V. Remini, one of Jackson's friends, while sitting in a Nashville store, shared what was probably a more lurid story about Erwin's disputed payment. When Dickinson heard the story, he sent a friend, Thomas Swann, to act as a go-between to inquire about what Jackson said about his father-in-law. Whether the friend misinterpreted or even misrepresented what was said by the two men, this minor misunderstanding flamed into full controversy.

In a confrontation at Winn's Tavern, Jackson struck Swann with his cane and called him a stupid meddler. Dickinson sent Jackson a letter calling him a coward at about the same time that Swann wrote a column in a local newspaper calling Jackson a coward. Jackson responded in the same newspaper, claiming that Swann was a "lying valet for a worthless, drunken, blackguard", meaning Dickinson.

This was the last straw for Dickinson, who, after he returned from New Orleans in May 1806, published an attack on Jackson in the local newspaper, calling him "a poltroon and a coward". After reading the article, Jackson sent Dickinson a letter requesting "satisfaction due me for the insults offered".

== Death ==
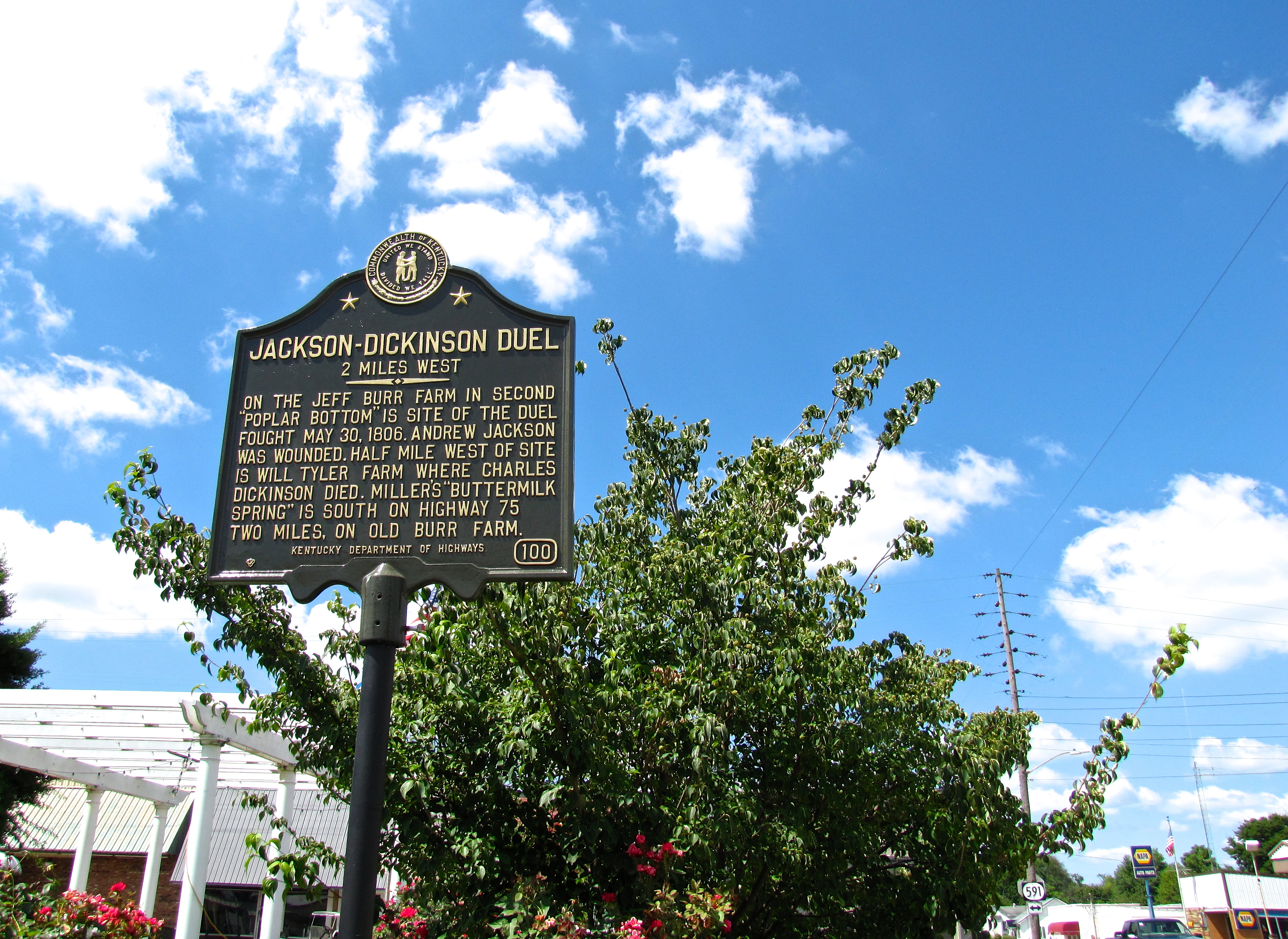
Kentucky Department of Highways historical marker on the town square in Adairville, Kentucky, recalling the duel between Andrew Jackson and Charles Dickinson that took place nearby in 1806

Dueling was illegal in Tennessee. However, under United States early 1800s criminal law, it was very difficult to be extradited across state lines. As a result, the two men met near Adairville, Kentucky, adjacent to the Tennessee border, on May 30, 1806. Dickinson left Nashville the day before the duel with his second and a group of friends, confident, even demonstrating his shooting skills at various stops along the way. Since Dickinson was considered an expert shot, Jackson and his friend, Thomas Overton, determined it would be best to let Dickinson fire first, hoping that his aim might be spoiled in his quickness. The obvious weakness of this tactic was, of course, that Jackson might not be alive to take aim.

Jackson and Overton also devised a strategy that, if Overton should win the coin toss to give the word to fire, he would ask Dickinson the question "Gentlemen, are you ready?" purposefully after asking Jackson, and then would immediately say "Fire" in an attempt to cause Dickinson to fire impulsively. Overton did indeed win the coin toss, and subsequently used this strategy.

Dickinson fired first, hitting Jackson in the chest. Incredibly, Jackson not only survived, merely wounded, but aimed his pistol and returned fire. Under the rules of dueling, Dickinson had to remain still as Jackson took his shot. Jackson's pistol stopped at half cock, so he drew back the hammer and aimed again, this time hitting Dickinson in the chest. Dickinson bled to death as a result of his wound.

The expert Dickinson had aimed at Jackson's heart, though the bullet had been slightly deflected by Jackson's brass button on his coat, which some claim was due to him deliberately wearing loose clothing over his lean frame. It has also been suggested that Jackson adopted a careful sideways stance to ensure that his heart was obstructed. The bullet broke some of Jackson's ribs and had ended up lodged inches from his heart. While Jackson could easily have been incapacitated by such a wound, an unconfirmed account later claimed that while conversing with a friend on his deathbed he stated, "If he had shot me through the brain, sir, I should still have killed him."

Doctors determined that the bullet lodged in Jackson's chest was too close to his heart to operate, so Jackson carried it for the rest of his life, suffering much pain from the wound. Locals were outraged that Dickinson had to stand defenseless while Jackson re-cocked and shot him. This was a confusing application of the rules of dueling, as snaps were considered as good as a shot. A snap implies that the hammer fell completely and failed to cause a shot, but a half cock is not a snap. Dickinson's second nervously permitted Jackson to re-cock his pistol. Some might claim that Jackson could have shot into the air or shot only to injure Dickinson; this would have been considered sufficient satisfaction under dueling rules. Jackson replied that Dickinson had meant to "kill the gent," so Jackson had also shot to kill. Jackson's reputation suffered greatly from the duel.

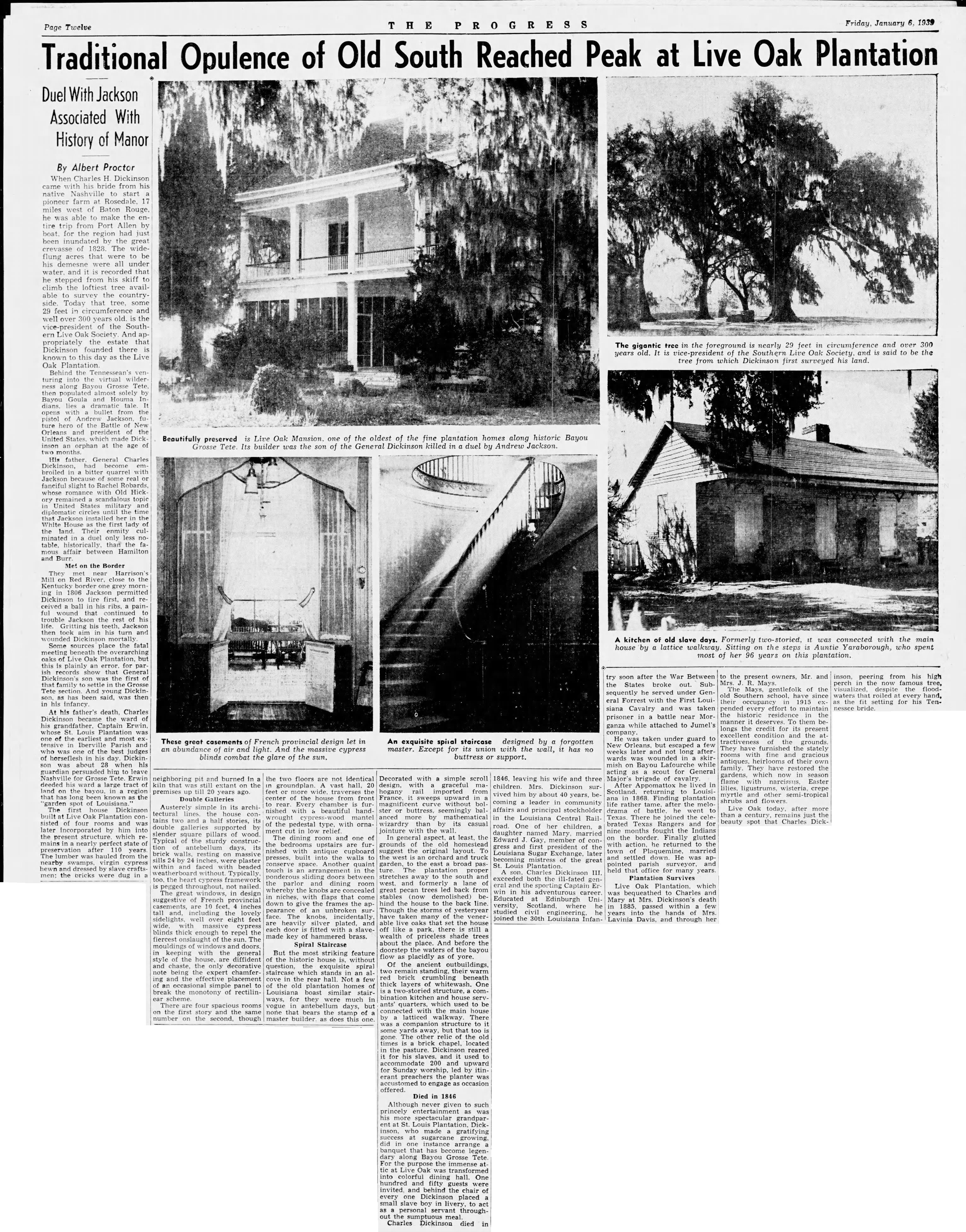
People enslaved by Dickinson's son built Live Oak Plantation (Iberville Parish, Louisiana) ("Traditional Opulence of South Reached Peak at Live Oak Plantation" by Albert Procter, The American Progress, Hammond, Louisiana, January 6, 1939)

== Burial places ==
According to a history of Nashville published in 1912, "His remains were brought back to Nashville and interred upon one of the highest points of his father-in-law's extensive estate, his funeral, according to the custom of the time, taking place some weeks after his death. At the time of his duel, Dickinson's family consisted of a young wife and an infant child. The latter, grown to manhood two generations ago, placed around the lonely grave in the wood land a cedar fence, which in the course of time was supplanted by the box tomb now covering the grave." He was reinterred in the Old City Cemetery in Nashville after his grave was rediscovered in 2010. By that time, the original grave site had become unmarked and claims had been made that his remains were buried elsewhere.

Caroline County, Maryland has a historical marker asserting that Dickinson is buried there: "Body returned here by Truxton faithful Negro servant. Lead casket found 500 yards east of this spot Dec. 1, 1965." A man named Huyett Truxton claimed that his grandfather had escorted Dickinson's body back to Maryland for burial, as per Dickinson's express wish, "sealed in a lead casket and 'sloshing' in alcohol all the way."

== See also ==
- List of people killed in duels
- List of violent incidents involving Andrew Jackson
- Horses of Andrew Jackson
