= Jackson–Dickinson duel =

1806 incident in Kentucky

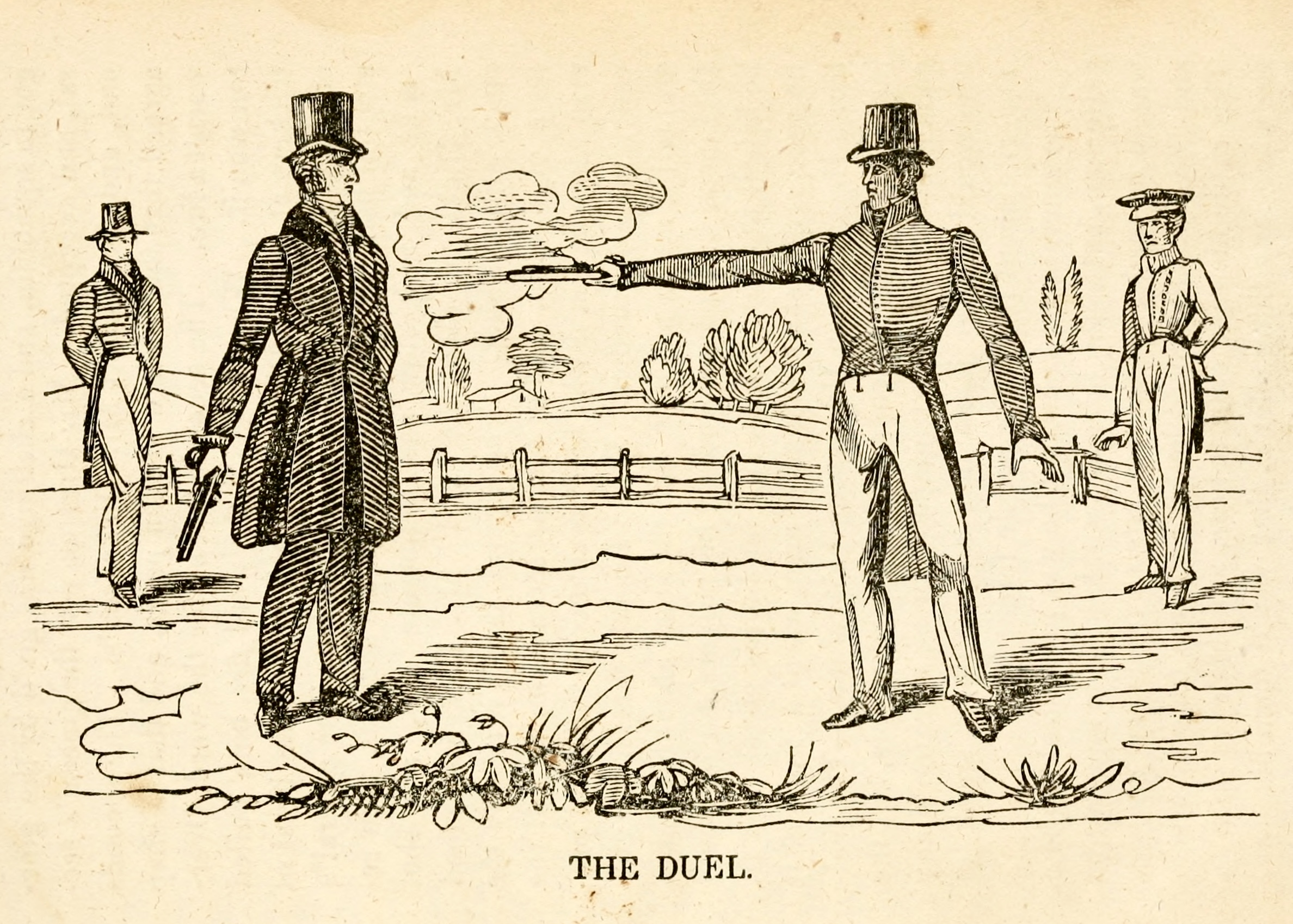
Date	May 30, 1806
Location	Harrison's Mill, Logan County, Kentucky

Belligerents
Andrew Jackson	Charles Dickinson

Casualties and losses
Andrew Jackson wounded	Charles Dickinson killed

The Jackson–Dickinson duel was a duel between Tennessee politician and businessman Andrew Jackson, then a future president of the United States, and attorney and slave trader Charles Dickinson on May 30, 1806. The duel took place at Harrison's Mill in Logan County, Kentucky, resulting in the death of Charles Dickinson. The location is a Kentucky historical site.

== Background ==
According to Mark R. Cheathem, historian, Jackson biographer, and editor of the presidential papers of Martin Van Buren, "The origin of the dispute between Jackson and Dickinson remains uncertain." Cheathem traces claims that Dickinson insulted Jackson's wife Rachel (by surfacing the origin story of their marriage) to Jackson's first major biographer, James Parton, writing in 1860. The divorce of Rachel Donelson Robards from Lewis Robards was not finalized until 1793. Andrew and Rachel married in 1794. Parton reported "that sometime between November 1805 and January 1806 Dickinson, who was prone to drunken bravado, besmirched Rachel's name in public." However, commented Cheathem, "Nowhere in the private correspondence or public exchanges that took place during these months, however, does Rachel's name appear as a pretext for the enmity between the two men."

=== The horse race dispute ===
In 1805, Andrew Jackson and planter and slave trader Joseph Erwin held a horse race where the stakes were $2,000 and an $800 forfeit. Erwin's horse, Ploughboy, went lame and could not race. After a minor dispute, Erwin paid Jackson the complete forfeit. In the meantime, unkind words were exchanged, for instance in a letter of January 1806, Dickinson wrote Jackson, "As to the word coward, I think it as applicable to yourself as anyone that I know and I shall be very glad when an opportunity serves to know in what manner you give your anodynes and hope you will take in payment one of my most moderate cathartics."

=== Newspaper column quarrels ===
After the horse race dispute, a friend of Jackson in Nashville, Tennessee, told the story to Charles Dickinson, though this perspective is widely considered to be more disturbing. After hearing the story, Dickinson sent Thomas Swann to inquire about what Jackson had said. Swann confronted Jackson at Winn's Tavern. Jackson called Swann a meddler and struck him with his cane. Swann published a column in the paper, calling Jackson a coward. Jackson later responded in the same newspaper, saying Swann worked for a "lying valet for a worthless, drunken, blackguard," hinting at Dickinson.

Preceding events included Jackson beating Virginia attorney Thomas Swann with a cane at Winn's Tavern (January 13), and Nathaniel McNairy and John Coffee duelling across the state line in Kentucky (March 1), all surrounded by a swirling cloud of public letters and affidavits between the parties accusing each other of various forms of malfeasance and defending themselves against such charges. After departing from New Orleans, Louisiana, in May 1806, an enraged Charles Dickinson published an attack on Jackson, calling him a "poltroon and a coward." Jackson replied with a duel challenge.

In the words of poet and University of Missouri professor Bettina Drew, "The absurd triviality of the dispute, essentially a matter of poorly repeated rumors, is obscured by the long, self-righteous, self-justifying, and insulting letters the several men involved wrote one another."

== The duel ==
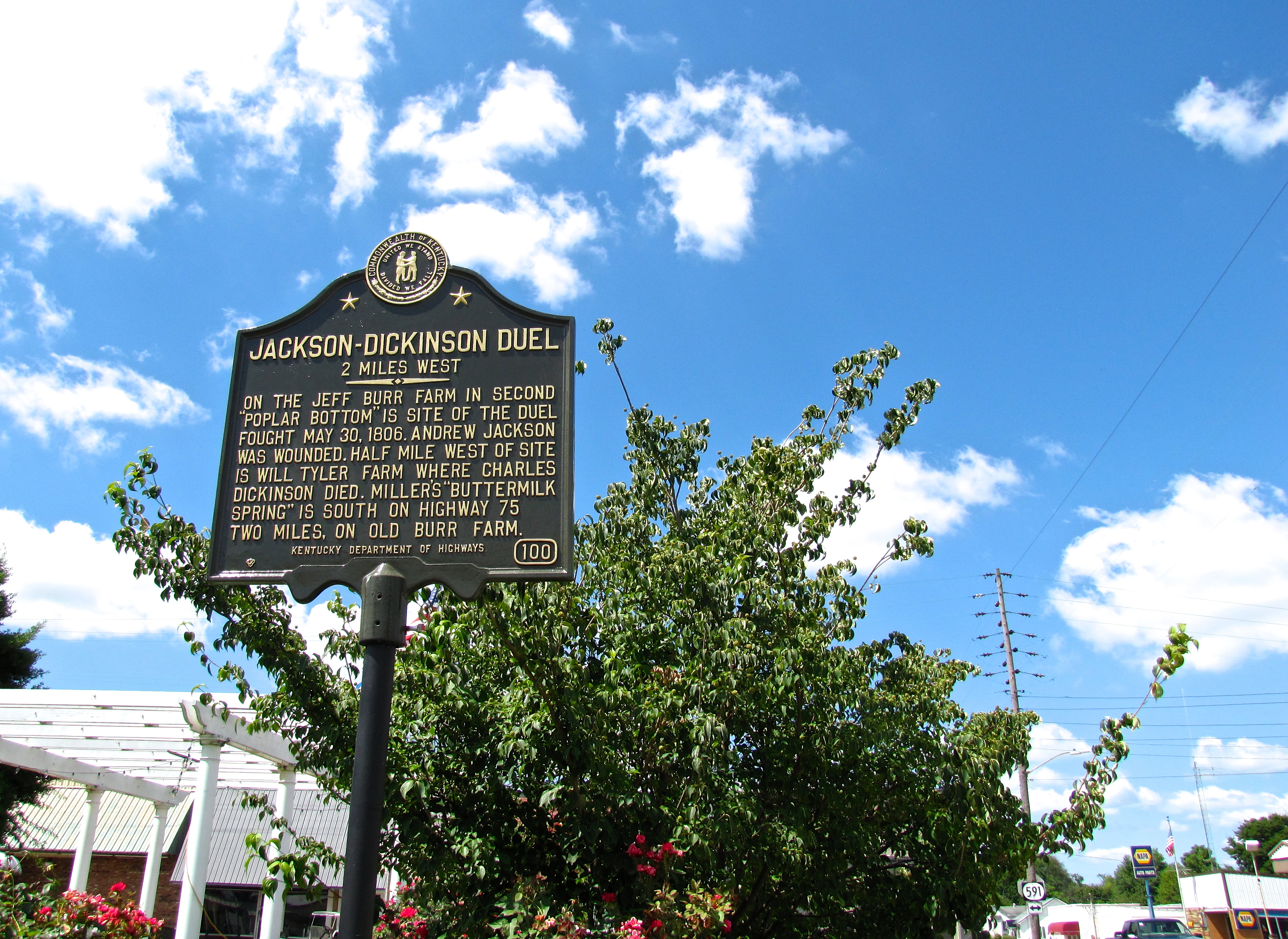
The historical marker located in Adairville, Kentucky

On May 30, 1806, future president Andrew Jackson and Charles Dickinson met at Harrison's Mill in Logan County, Kentucky, to duel. Dickinson's first shot hit Jackson in the chest. Although the shot was not fatal, it did cause chronic pain for the remainder of Jackson's life. Jackson's first shot misfired. According to code duello, Jackson should not have been allowed to re-fire. However, he did and fatally shot Dickinson, killing him. Jackson is said to have written about the faceoff, "I reserved my fire, and when I did shoot, you may be assured I left the damned rascal weltering in his blood."

The site of the duel is a historical site in Kentucky, historical marker #100 commemorates the site. The marker is located on the town square in Adairville, Kentucky. The marker reads, "On the Jeff Burr farm in second 'Poplar Bottom' is the site of the duel fought May 30, 1806. Andrew Jackson was wounded. Half mile west of site is Will Tyler farm where Charles Dickinson died. Miller's "Buttermilk Spring" is south on highway 75 two miles, on Old Burr farm."

== See also ==
- Andrew Jackson and the slave trade § Connection to other Jackson controversies
- List of violent incidents involving Andrew Jackson
- List of duels in the United States
- Jackson–Benton brawl of 1813
- Bibliography of Andrew Jackson

== Sources ==
- Cheathem, Mark R. (2014). Andrew Jackson, Southerner. Baton Rouge, Louisiana: Louisiana State University Press. ISBN 978-0-8071-5099-3. LCCN 2012049695. OCLC 858995561. Project MUSE book 26506.
- Drew, Bettina Lee (December 2001). Master Andrew Jackson: Indian Removal and the Culture of Slavery (Thesis). Yale University. UMI 3030759. ProQuest 3030759.
- Jackson, Andrew (1984). Moser, Harold; Macpherson, Sharon (eds.). The Papers of Andrew Jackson, Volume II, 1804–1813. University of Tennessee Press. doi:10.7290/utp3038. ISBN 978-0-87049-441-3.
