= Coffin Handbills =

Series of pamphlets attacking Andrew Jackson

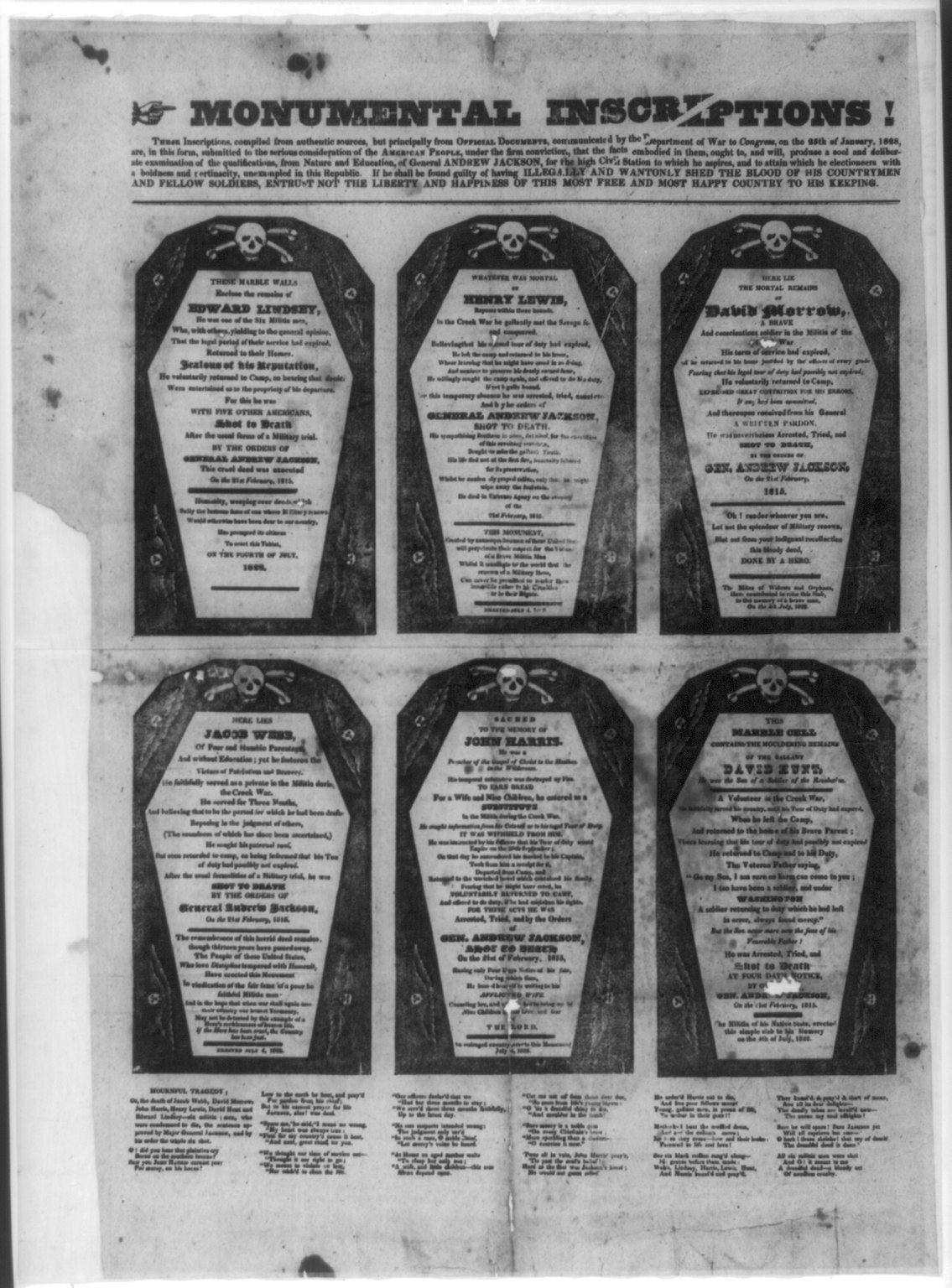
Monumental inscriptions!

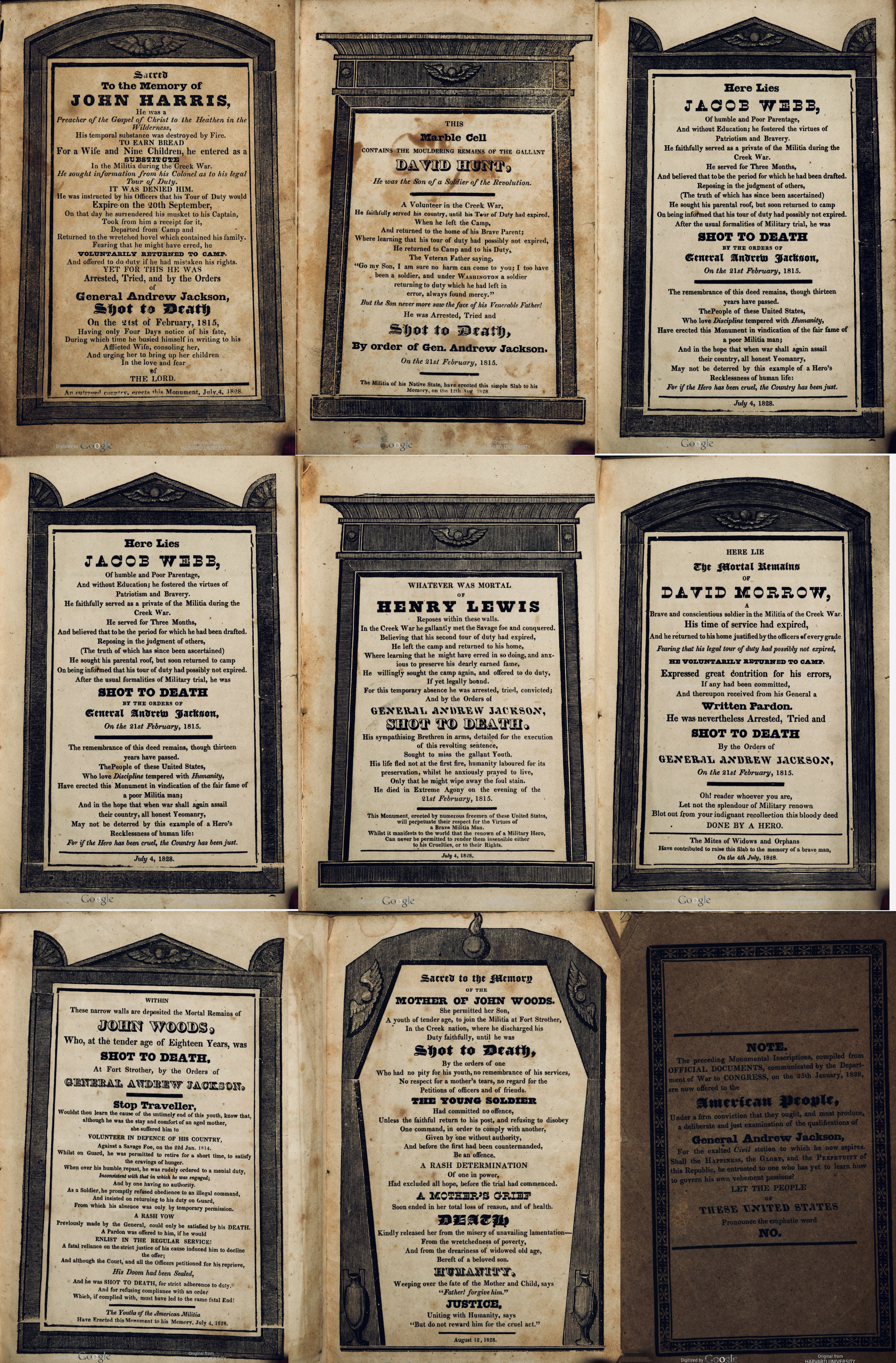
Coffin Handbills series, 1828 (Harvard University Libraries)

The Coffin Handbills were a series of pamphlets attacking Andrew Jackson during the 1828 United States presidential election. Jackson was running against incumbent John Quincy Adams. The campaign featured multiple attacks on the characters and personal histories of the candidates.

Many of the attacks were false.

== First handbill ==
"Some account of the bloody deeds of General Andrew Jackson", c. 1828

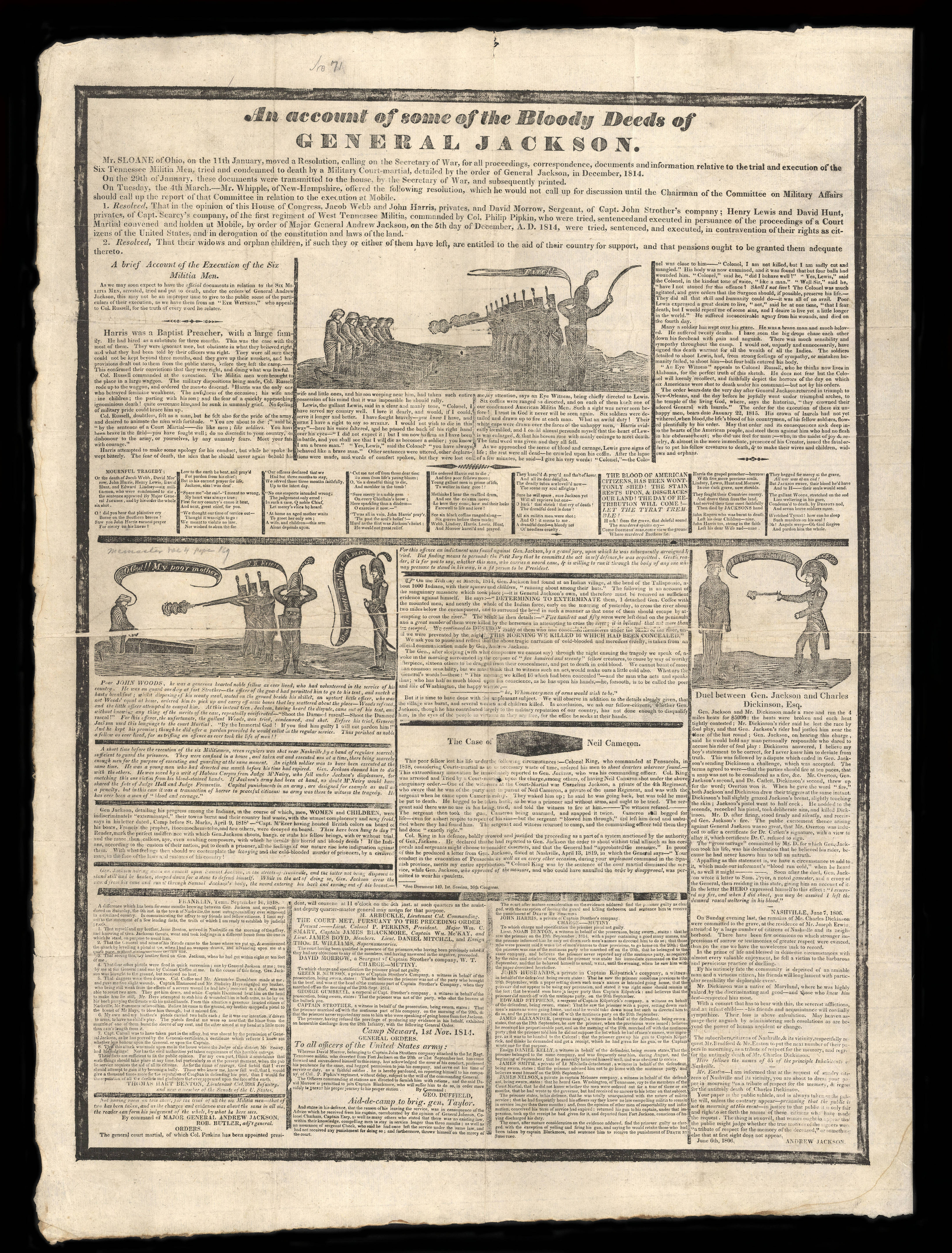
An account of some of the bloody deeds of General Andrew Jackson

Andrew Jackson had developed a reputation as a great leader and national hero during the Battle of New Orleans, the final action in the War of 1812. This reputation was challenged when John Binns, editor and publisher of the Democratic Press in Philadelphia, published the first "Coffin Handbill." The poster displayed six black coffins and claimed that Jackson had ordered the execution of six militiamen during the Creek War. Another twelve coffins were displayed further down the page to represent regular soldiers and American Indians who had been put to death under Jackson's command. Binns wrote that this had occurred during the Battle of Horseshoe Bend, when Jackson attacked the Red Stick fortification. Roughly 800 of the 1000 Red Stick warriors were killed in the battle. The pamphlet also featured a political cartoon of Jackson assaulting and stabbing Samuel Jackson in the streets of Nashville.

== Accusations of adultery ==
A subsequent pamphlet accused Jackson of committing adultery with his current wife. Jackson's wife Rachel had applied for a divorce from a previous marriage in 1790. According to Jackson, he and his wife married in 1791 and they realized two years later that her divorce had not been granted until 1793, meaning that Rachel had been committing bigamy for two years. In January 1794, Jackson and Rachel were legally married in a new ceremony. The accusations infuriated Jackson. He responded by writing letters to newspaper editors, telling them how they should change their reports. Rachel Jackson suffered a heart attack and died before Jackson's inauguration. He blamed his political enemies and tensions for her death.

== Accusations of cannibalism ==
A "Supplemental account of some of the bloody deeds of General Jackson," attributed to Virginia Congressman John Taliaferro, accused Jackson of "atrocious and unnatural acts." Such acts included: slaughtering 1,000 unarmed Native Americans, taking a nap in the midst of their corpses, and eating a dozen of them for breakfast. Taliaferro went on to speculate about how Jackson might treat American governors and Congressmen similarly, were he elected president.

== Further Context ==
Tensions between Jackson and Adams began with the 1824 presidential election, which was a four-way race between Jackson, Adams, William H. Crawford, and Henry Clay. Jackson gained a plurality of both the popular vote and the electoral vote, but no candidate had an Electoral College majority. Adams eventually won the election in the House of Representatives by making a deal with Clay that Jackson supporters dubbed the "corrupt bargain."

As a result, the 1828 rematch between Jackson and Adams was unusually acrimonious. Newspaper articles and political cartoons were the most common forms of the attacks against each man. After Jackson's victory, the bitterness of the campaign resonated for years. When Jackson arrived in Washington DC, he was meant to pay the customary courtesy call on the outgoing president (John Quincy Adams), but he refused to do so. John Quincy Adams responded by refusing to attend Andrew Jackson's inauguration.

== Response ==
After the Coffin Handbill first appeared, Jackson had his "Nashville Committee" of supporters fight back. They accused John Quincy Adams of serving as a pimp while he was the American ambassador to Russia, claiming he had procured an American girl to sexually serve the Russian tsar.

In fact, Adams, while Minister to Russia, had employed a young girl as his wife's maid; the girl had written a letter which was later intercepted by the Russian Postal services. Tsar Alexander I had wished to meet the letter-writer publicly at court, and Adams had allowed them to meet.

Adams was also attacked for allegedly having charged the government to place a pool table in the White House. Adams did spend a fair amount of time playing billiards, but had paid for the table with his own funds. A bill for repairing the table had once been accidentally included in the White House expense accounts.

== Legacy ==
Twenty-seven different versions of the Coffin Handbills have been located to date. All have different numbers of coffins and combinations of stories accusing Jackson of murder and violence. Subsequently, the term "Coffin Handbill" became synonymous with a smear attack on political candidates.

== See also ==
- Andrew Jackson presidential campaign, 1828
- Andrew Jackson and the slave trade in the United States
- List of violent incidents involving Andrew Jackson
