= List of violent incidents involving Andrew Jackson =

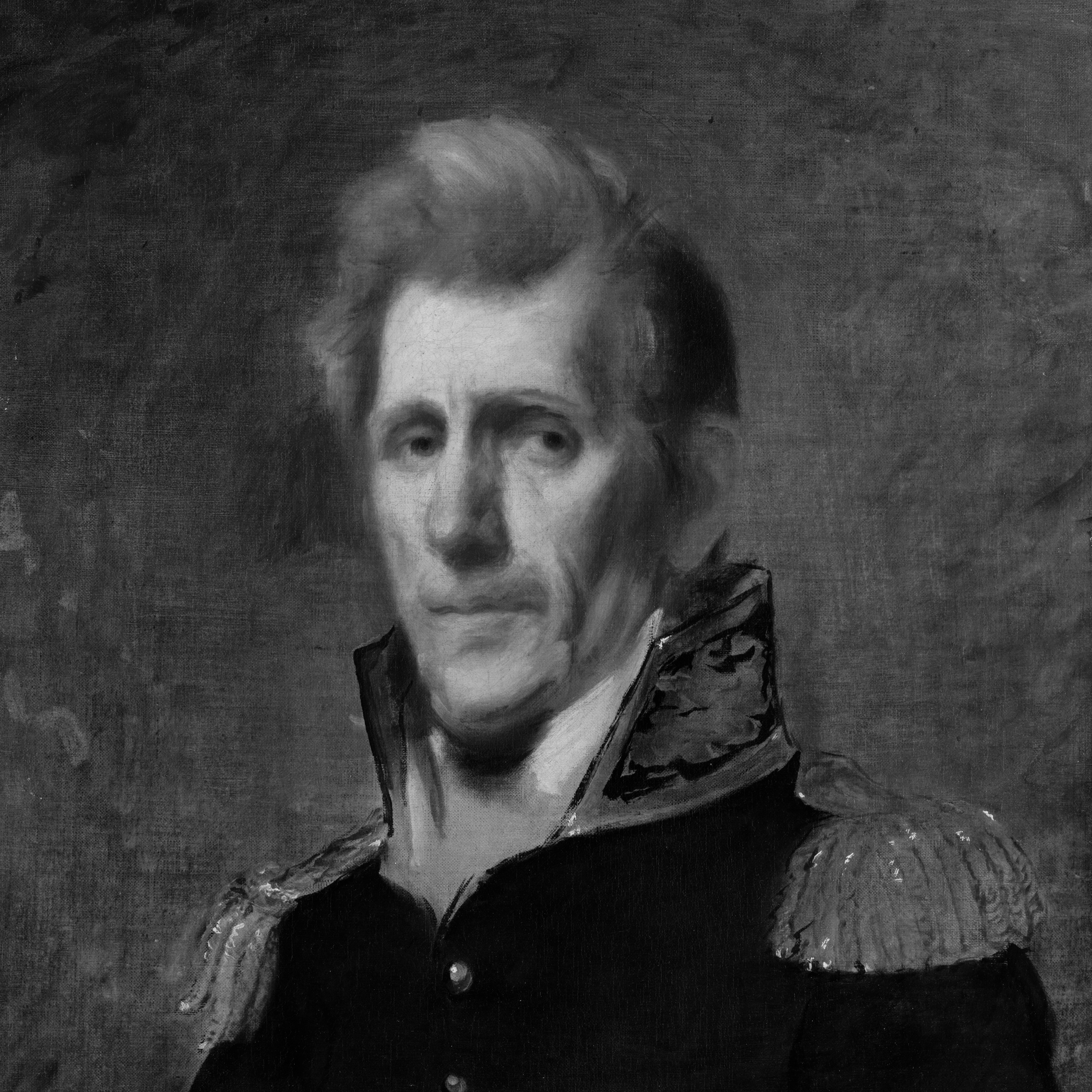
Andrew Jackson at age 52, 1819 portrait in oil paint by Samuel Lovett Waldo (Metropolitan Museum of Art object 06.197)

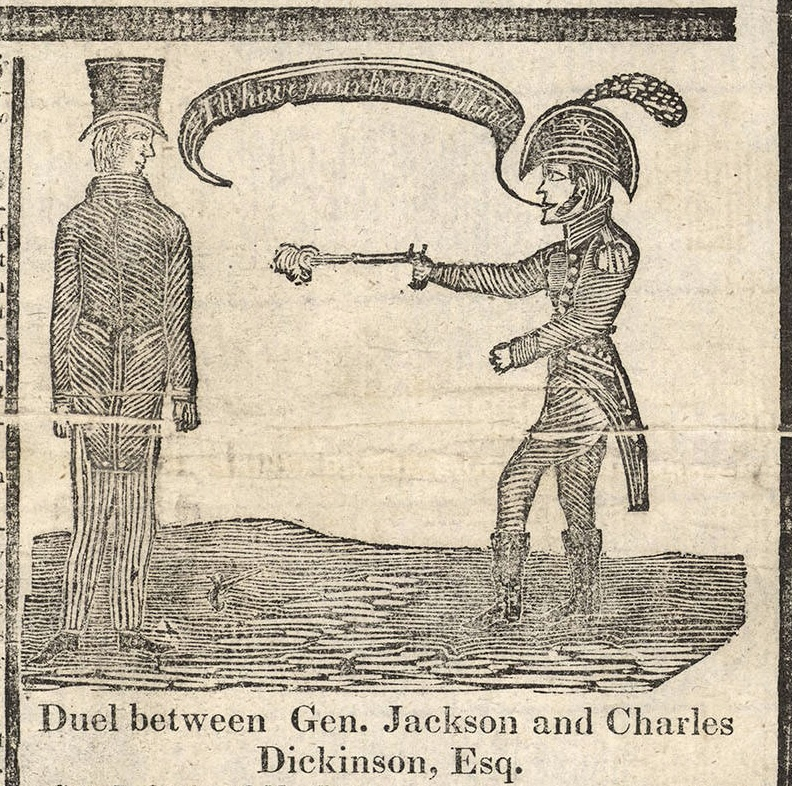
Duel between Gen. Jackson and Charles Dickinson, Esq. in 1806 – woodcut from one of the 1828 Coffin Handbills

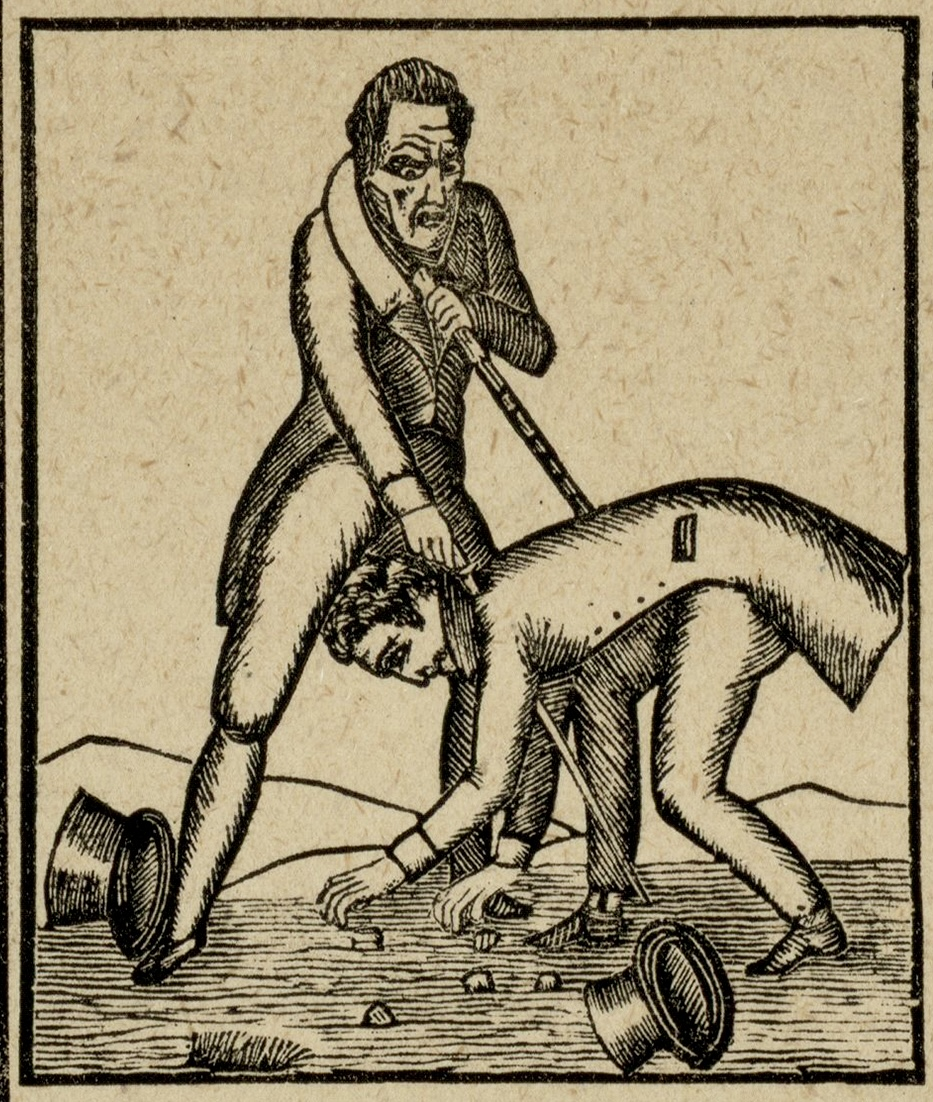
Andrew Jackson stabbing Samuel Jackson with a cane-sword – woodcut from one of the 1828 Coffin Handbills

Andrew Jackson, later seventh president of the United States, was involved in altercations and quarrels throughout the course of his life. Jackson killed a man and was shot in a duel (in 1806); was shot in a tavern brawl (in 1813); and was charged, in separate incidents, with assault and battery (1806; convicted), and assault with intent to kill (1807; acquitted). In multiple incidents over several decades Jackson and his underlings reportedly brandished or deployed a wide array of weapons against their opponents, including horsewhips, knives secreted in canes, canes used as melee weapons, clubs, axes, pistols, and rifles. (Note: This list of weapons does not include weapons used in war, nor means of execution used on men he sentenced to death when he was an officer of the U.S. military or Tennessee militia, nor actions taken or not taken by the U.S. military and Indian Affairs officers during the expulsion and deportation of Indigenous people from the U.S. South.) In the words of biographer Mark R. Cheathem, "Jackson's propensity toward violence was a lifelong characteristic. Borne partly out of his cultural ancestry, partly out of his personality, and partly out of his childhood in the Waxhaws, the expectations of the southern gentry accentuated this tendency. Jackson used violence during these years to establish his reputation as an honorable gentleman. These affairs of honor ignited not from the flamboyant chest pounding of a wild frontiersman but from the deliberate calculation of an aspiring southern planter determined to force recognition of his place among the elite."

== Physical violence of Andrew Jackson ==
According to historian J. M. Opal, "[Jackson's] willingness to kill, assault, or threaten people was a constant theme in his adult life and a central component of the reputation he cultivated." One writer who investigated Jackson's brief residence circa 1788–89 in what is now East Tennessee reported, "He was recognized from the first as a man who 'would fight at the drop of a hat, and drop the hat himself.'" Donald B. Cole wrote that Jackson's "violent personality emerged early and dominated his life." Per biographer Robert V. Remini, Jackson had a "vicious temper that frequently exploded into ugly language and acts," and such a temper tantrum, "so furious and startlingly sudden, intimidated his victims by its abruptness and its noisiness." Horse trainer and Congressman Baylie Peyton wrote that "nobody ever 'jawed back' at Old Hickory when he was in one of his ways." One historian wrote of his pre-war years, "His temper was nothing less than volcanic. His oaths were varied, numerous, and highly effective. Yet after he reached middle life both were less frequently in evidence, and except upon extraordinary occasions were more moderate than in youth." A Methodist chaplain wrote in his journal of the Natchez Expedition, "I find the Gen. cannot bare [sic] much opposition. He is a good General but a very incorrect divine." In 1820, after British subjects in Upper Canada destroyed a wax effigy of Jackson to protest the executions of Ambrister and Arbuthnot, a wag reportedly commented, "It was well Old Hickory did not appear in the heat of the action or he would have made you know the difference between the man of whacks, and the man of wax." In 1824, Thomas Jefferson visited with Daniel Webster, who wrote up a memorandum of topics they had discussed. According to Webster's notes, Jefferson said of Jackson, "His passions are terrible. When I was President of the Senate he was a Senator; and he could never speak on account of the rashness of his feelings. I have seen him attempt it repeatedly, and as often choke with rage. His passions are no doubt cooler now; he has been much tried since I knew him, but he is a dangerous man." When Jackson died in 1845, anti-Jacksonian Whig editor Parson Brownlow uncharitably (but with characteristic vituperative flair) eulogized the former President as having led "a life of eighty long years spent in the indulgence of the most bitter and vindictive passions which disgrace human nature, and distract the human mind."

It has been claimed that Jackson "participated in more than 100 duels over his lifetime". In 1828, Dr. James L. Armstrong, who had been a surgeon in Jackson's militia in the War of 1812, claimed that he had started making a list of altercations involving Jackson and the final list "accumulated to nearly ONE HUNDRED FIGHTS or violent and abusive quarrels." Armstrong's published index, issued under the title General Jackson's "juvenile indiscretions" between the ages of 23 and 60, listed 14 notable instances. Shortly after the publication of this negative-campaign material, a Kentucky newspaper claimed that four men, including Archibald Yell and his law partner William Gilchrist, stopped by to "assassinate" (assault) Dr. Armstrong in Bedford County for writing anti-Jackson columns, chasing him down and clubbing him. A comment from another correspondent was appended to the report: "This is Jacksonism in its true colors such as the Hero in early times has often acted himself!" Nashville papers claimed that the beating was because Armstrong had insulted Gilchrist's father by calling him a Tory, and reported that Malcolm Gilchrist beat Armstrong with a hickory stick, while Yell and another man, Jesse Taylor, did not strike Armstrong but did hold pistols at the ready. (In 1831, President Jackson appointed Yell to be receiver of public monies at the United States General Land Office in Little Rock, Arkansas Territory.)

There was arguably no such thing as a professional or political relationship with Andrew Jackson. In the words of historian William J. Cooper, "For Jackson, party and politics, like everything else, became intensely personal. Loyalty was the key...[he] always referred to political enemies with such phrases as 'infamous, dastardly and vilainouss [sic],' 'demagogues and apostates,' 'apostates and traitors,' 'Jesuitical hypocrites and apostates,' 'odious and unnatural'...Jackson simply tolerated no disagreements; to him personal and political loyalty could not be divided." Jackson seemingly judged loyalty only in the immediate moment; for instance, during the Creek War, Eli Hammond, a Tennessee militia officer and longtime "Indian fighter," who had intervened on Jackson's behalf in a tavern brawl five months prior, was treated with sneering disdain for having had the temerity to not be at Jackson's immediate beck and call: "I presume regrets his attachment to those vipers, who has been attempting to destroy his benefactors—I expect he will attend to his duty better, or I will arrest him." Jackson's use of violence against other wealthy White men (and foreign colonial powers) may also be informative about his personal use of violence against slaves: "Jackson [had] rage to spare as he considered dueling Thomas Hart Benton, John Sevier, Henry Clay, and others whom society viewed as his equals. It is difficult to believe that he would interact with an insolent enslaved man or woman on better terms than he would these esteemed gentlemen. It is also inconceivable that he would allow anyone to beat any of the horses he owned 300 times." His typical histrionics were, of course, present in his dealings with the Indigenous peoples of southeastern North America ("Andrew Jackson's Indian-hating is beyond question...When Big Warrior insisted on compensation for property losses, the enraged General threatened to put him in chains.") That Jackson was a bully by both avocation and by occupation—for fun and for profit—has been the conclusion of more than one historian.

One traveler in Nashville in early 1821 wrote home that although Jackson apparently no longer entered the "field of honor" himself, he served as something of a beneficent fight promoter to other duelists: "The eagerness with which Genl J formerly engaged in—& still patronises duelling, has tended to increase, the practice here greatly & perhaps Nashville stands first in the Union with the number of scientific operators." Henry Marie Brackenridge wrote ruefully about an incident that took place later that year, in Florida, "In the plenitude of his [Andrew Jackson's] power he permitted a fatal duel to be fought in Pensacola, in the most public and notorious manner, which a single word from him would have prevented it!" The surgeon for the duel between a U.S. Army doctor named Hull and a former U.S. Army lieutenant named Randall was Jackson's former military aide Dr. James C. Bronaugh, who reported back on the results. Breckenridge concluded, "Poor Hull was shot through the heart; his pistol, which was a hair trigger, had stopped at half cock. The General was much displeased. 'D--m the pistol,' said he; 'by G—d, to think that a brave man should risk his life on a hair trigger!' He was sufficiently generous not to arrest Randal, but gave him an intimation instantly to quit the town, which might have been given before the affair had taken place."

== Campaign issue ==
Jackson's apparent propensity for physical violence was very much an issue for the anti-Jacksonians in the 1824 and 1828 presidential elections. During the 1824 presidential election, Jesse Benton, brother of U.S. Senator Thomas Hart Benton (and certainly an interested party in questions of Jacksonian violence, as he was the one who shot Jackson in 1813), published a pamphlet that stated, "...it is a notorious fact, that he was scarce ever known to leave a [horse racing] round without having participated in an affray or riot, or at least a quarrel." News reports about Jackson's history of violence seem to have at least caught the attention of the voting public. In Natchez, Mississippi, which was at times the center of "an almost blind hero-worship" of Jackson ("based more on his many local acquaintances and his military record than on his position in national politics"), a group of nabobs published an anti-Jackson broadside in 1828. The signatories, including Stephen Duncan, Francis Surget, Alvarez Fisk, Felix Huston, and Adam L. Bingaman, indicated that they supported Adams, attesting that they dreaded Jackson's election "as much (if possible) on account of the violence of his many adherents, as of his own peculiar unfitness for the station." One Delaware voter wrote his local newspaper to this effect:

They do not deny, that Andrew Jackson has often been engaged in the most disgraceful broils and riots in the streets and taverns of Nashville, shooting with pistols and stabbing with dirks on all hands of him. But they tell you that we have no right to investigate his private character, and that his quarrels, duels, adulteries and murders, furnish no arguments against his fitness for an office, where patience, ability and virtuous principles are indispensable requisites to the continuance of the good Government and liberties of our country.

Similarly, Thomas E. Waggaman, former merchant of Nashville, resident of Washington, D.C., wrote Felix Robertson in November 1828 that he had received a letter from a "corresponding committee in Harrisburg Pa. requesting me to give them a history of the Genl's 'trading in negroes cutting off ears' and other acts of violence ascribed to him by the tools of corruption." Jackson was an interstate slave trader active for 20–25 years (c. 1789–c. 1814). Whether or not he ever cut off anyone's ears is unrecorded by history, although he repeatedly threatened it. In 1827 an anti-Jacksonian pamphleteer nodded to the ear-cropping hearsay when he wrote (emphasis added), "Andrew Jackson, and John Quincy Adams, have placed themselves before a court of enquiry, the nation is the tribunal, every citizen is a member of the court, I am one of them. I will speak therefore, although I jeopardize my ears, or my life."

== Hickory ==
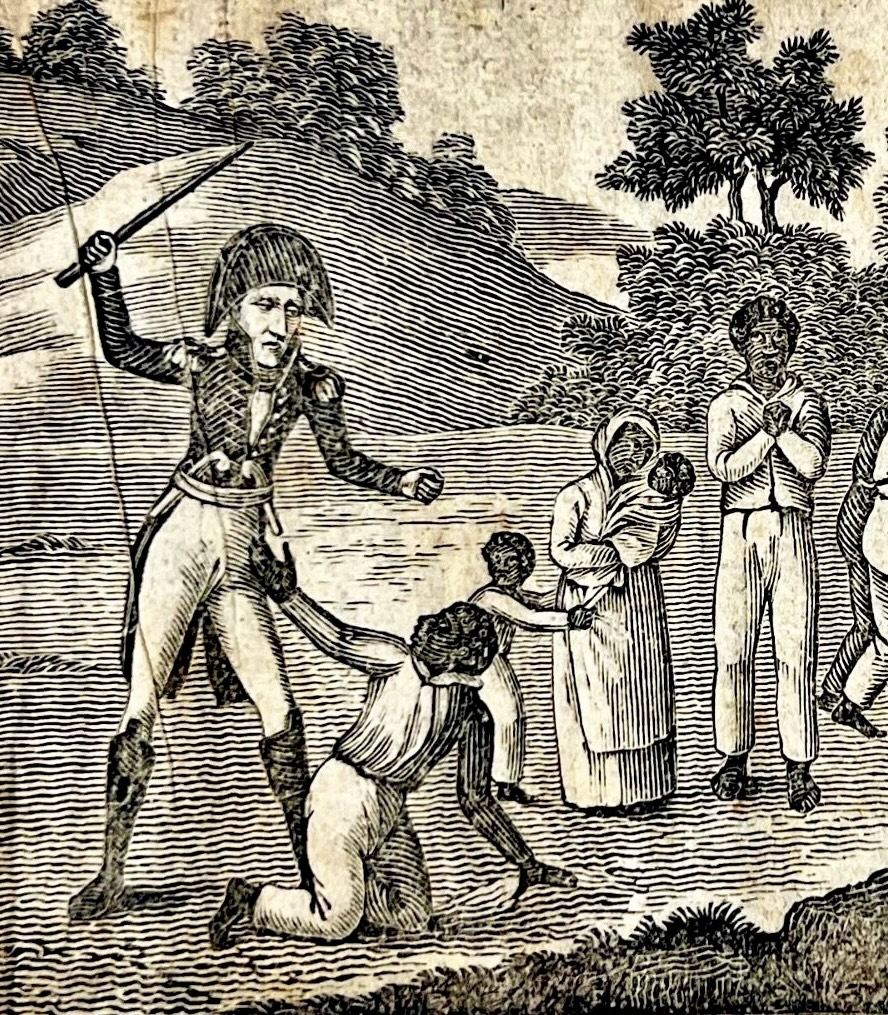
This 1828 anti-Andrew Jackson woodcut shows him wielding a rod, potentially made out of hickory wood

Jackson's nickname Old Hickory, or Ol' Hickory, may have been a play on words hinting at his predilection for violence. The Oxford English Dictionary definition for hickory oil (sense 2) is "U.S. figurative corporal punishment using a hickory switch or similar instrument, viewed as a treatment for bad behaviour (now rare); During the first half of the nineteenth cent., the phrase was also used to refer to the administration of U.S. President Andrew Jackson, nicknamed Old Hickory (see Old Hickory n.), which may have influenced the development of sense (b)." The "hickory oil" treatment was sarcastically "celebrated for its efficacy in removing idleness." In November 1815, Jackson's adjutant Robert Butler wrote him with an update about the Hermitage slaves: "Your wenches as usual commenced open war and they have been brought to order by Hickory oil." At a dinner for Jackson in 1818, Major William White toasted to, "The enemies of our country—We wish no better weapon to whip them with, than an Old Hickory." A banquet toast made in Pennsylvania during the 1828 election saluted, "Hickory oil, an infallible remedy for the Quincy epidemic."

Hickory is one of the hardest hardwoods native to the United States. Hickory wood is used "for many items in which shock resistance is important" including for handles for axes, picks, sledges, and hammers.

== Fights, duels, beatdowns, and attempts ==
- Duel with Waightstill Avery, 1788; the challenge from Jackson read "Sir, when amans feelings & charector are injured...it is consistant with the charector of agentleman when he Injures aman to make aspedy reparation." Both men fired into the air. The cause seems to have been Avery ridiculing a legal argument made by Jackson in court. Avery reportedly gave Jackson a fatherly lecture after the duel was over and kept the written challenge filed amongst his myriad papers as "Challenge from Andrew Jackson." John Adair was Avery's second.
- Duel with unidentified opponent near Jonesboro, Tennessee, probably 1789, but sometime before November 1790, "'in the long meadow,' as it was then called (formerly the 'hollow'), on the north side of town, and they all asserted that the duel with Avery was fought on the hill on the south side...He said that Jackson hit his man, but he was not seriously wounded, and soon recovered and left the community; that Jackson was not touched."
- Allegedly, in 1790, Jackson "horsewhipped a certain Grayson who molested" an enslaved man named Ephraim.
- Allegedly, in approximately 1797, while Jackson was serving as a Representative to Congress, Founding Father, former North Carolina governor, and U.S. Senator Alexander Martin mentioned Jackson's brother-in-law Stockley Donelson's connection to North Carolina's Glasgow land frauds (just for one thing Donelson was married to a daughter of James Glasgow), in response to which Jackson "charged the Legislature, Executive and Citizens of North-Carolina, at a public dining table, with being a set of Rogues and Rascals, and challenged the Governor to a duel." Martin verbally deescalated the situation.
- "About the year 1797–8" allegedly sent a peremptory challenge to William Cocke to "fight with pistols"
- Allegedly, according to an Adams-aligned paper in 1826, while Jackson was a judge (between 1798 and 1804), "it so happened that a man, with whom he had previously been at variance, and who had insulted him, made his appearance in the Court Room. The Judge, on recognising him, threw off his coat, assailed him with a cow-hide, and whipped him to his heart's satisfaction!"
- Roadside standoff in 1803 between Jackson and John Sevier, pistols and a sword were drawn but to no effect. Remini speculated that "with all this dallying it is possible that neither man really wanted to risk his life and career on a duel but that both wished to stigmatize the other with a refusal to fight. Perhaps it should be pointed out that Sevier had eighteen children." Armstrong claims "Jackson follows Sevier around with his friend Dr. Van Dyke forty miles" before the shootout that did not come to pass.
- Allegedly challenged Sevier's secretary William Macklin to a duel at the same time
- February 13, 1804 - "Assaulted John C. Henderson;" "sued by a John C. Henderson for $5,000 for trespassing, assault, and battery"

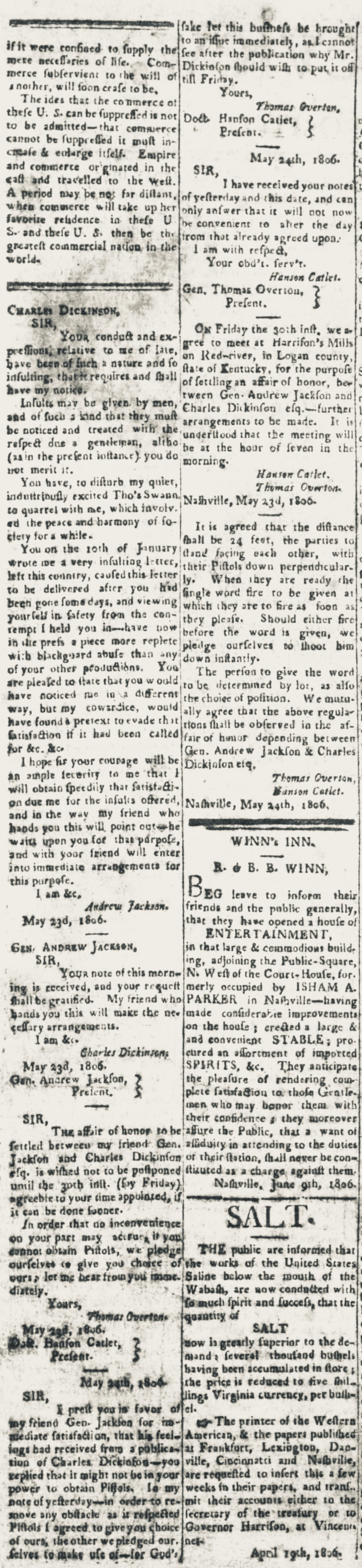
"Some letters written before the Dickinson duel and some accounts of the duel." (The Impartial Review and Cumberland Repository, Nashville, June 14, 1806)

- January 13, 1806 - Jackson beat Virginia-born attorney Thomas Swann with a cane at Winn's Tavern, part of the long lead-up to the fatal-for-Dickinson Jackson–Dickinson duel. Armstrong's description: "Jackson and Thomas Swan of Virginia differ on the race track-high and abusive language takes place—Swan challenges him, and he, for the first time, refuses to fight; but tells Swan's friend Mr. N. A. McNairy to inform Mr. Swan, that he would be in Nashville on Saturday and cane him—and accordingly Jackson appears with several men—the moment Swan appeared at the dinner table, Jackson fell on him with his stick—Swan threw him off into the fireplace—the General's friends soon relieved him, and then Jackson drew his big pistol and told Swan to defend himself—Swan replied he was unarmed and they were parted."
- January 27, 1806 - "Found guilty of assault and battery upon Thomas Baird"
- c. March 3, 1806 – "Plans for a duel between Jackson and Nathaniel McNairy aborted."
- May 30, 1806 - Duel with Charles Dickinson, Jackson killed Dickinson; Dickinson hit Jackson first, and Jackson may have later suffered lead poisoning as a result of the unremoved bullet, but "concealed his own injury from Dickinson's associates to spite Dickinson in his death."
- March 6, 1807 - Jackson chased down fellow land speculator Samuel Dorsey Jackson in the street over an unpaid debt, S. Jackson was evidently unarmed but reached for a rock to defend himself, and A. Jackson deployed a knife hidden inside a cane. Jackson was tried and acquitted on charges of assault with intent to kill against Samuel Jackson (no relation, as far as historians can tell). S. Jackson was not seriously injured, if at all, and the pair later did business with one another. The indictment, written by future U.S. Senator Jenkin Whiteside, stated that the stab wound was .5 in (13 mm) across and 4 in (100 mm) deep. The exact language was that Andrew Jackson "an assault did make in & upon one Samuel Jackson, in the peace of the State then and there being, and that the said Andrew Jackson, with a certain drawn Sword which he said Andrew Jackson in his right hand then & there had & held in and upon the Left side of him the said Samuel Jackson above the Short ribs of him the said Samuel did Strike & thrust, giving to the Said Samuel Jackson then & there with the Sword aforesaid in & upon the aforesaid left side of him the said Samuel above the short ribs of him the said Samuel a wound of the breadth of half an Inch and of the depth of four inches with an Intent him the said Samuel Jackson then & there feloniously wilfully and of his malice aforethought, to kill & murder, and other wrongs & enormities to Said Samuel Jackson then and there did to the great damage of the said Samuel Jackson and against the peace & dignity of the State."
- Allegedly, at some point during the Clover Bottom Racetrack era (approximately 1805–1810), Jackson's business partner Patton Anderson "was suspected of fixing the horse races...and on at least two occasions the losers were so enraged they attempted to lynch Anderson. Both times Anderson's life was saved by Andrew Jackson. On one occasion Jackson was able to stall the crowd, giving Anderson time to escape, by clicking a snuff box behind his back to simulate the sound of cocked pistols. On the other occasion, Jackson held drawn pistols on the crowd, allowing Anderson time to escape."
- According to various reliable sources, threatened a federal agent in 1812. One description has it that "when he approached the Agency, he armed his negroes with axes, hired some half breed Indians with their arms—marched by the agency in military order, himself at their head with the cap of his holsters thrown back, and his rifle cocked", and later successfully campaigned to have the agent's boss, Silas Dismoor, fired from his job.

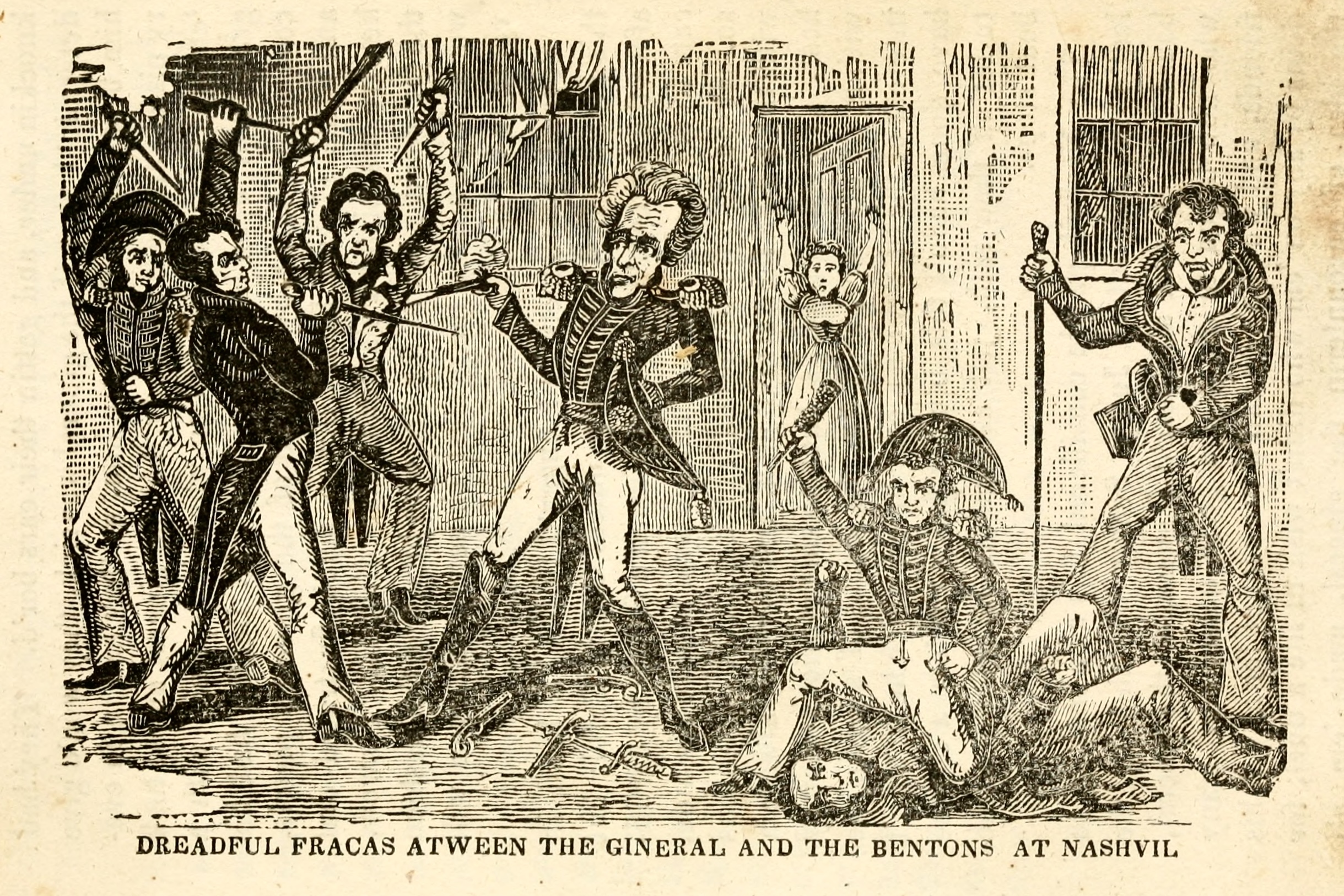
"Dreadful Fracas Atween the Gineral and the Bentons at Nashvil" from Seba Smith's 1834 parodic biography of Andrew Jackson

- In 1813, shortly before the Redsticks War began, Jackson participated in a brawl at a Nashville tavern with Thomas Hart Benton (great-great-uncle of the painter), Jesse Benton, John Coffee, Stockley Hays, Eli Hammond, and Alexander Donelson. The men deployed knives, and whips, and shot each other with pistols; Jesse Benton shot Jackson in the shoulder or arm and Jackson was seriously injured. At age 46, this was Jackson's last gunfight. According to Remini in 1977, "Like the others, there was something petty about it. None of Jackson's quarrels did him credit; all diminished him." As of 1826, there were allegedly still two bullets from this fight embedded in the wall of the tavern "to which some of the hot headed Tennesseans daily offer repeated and hearty libations."

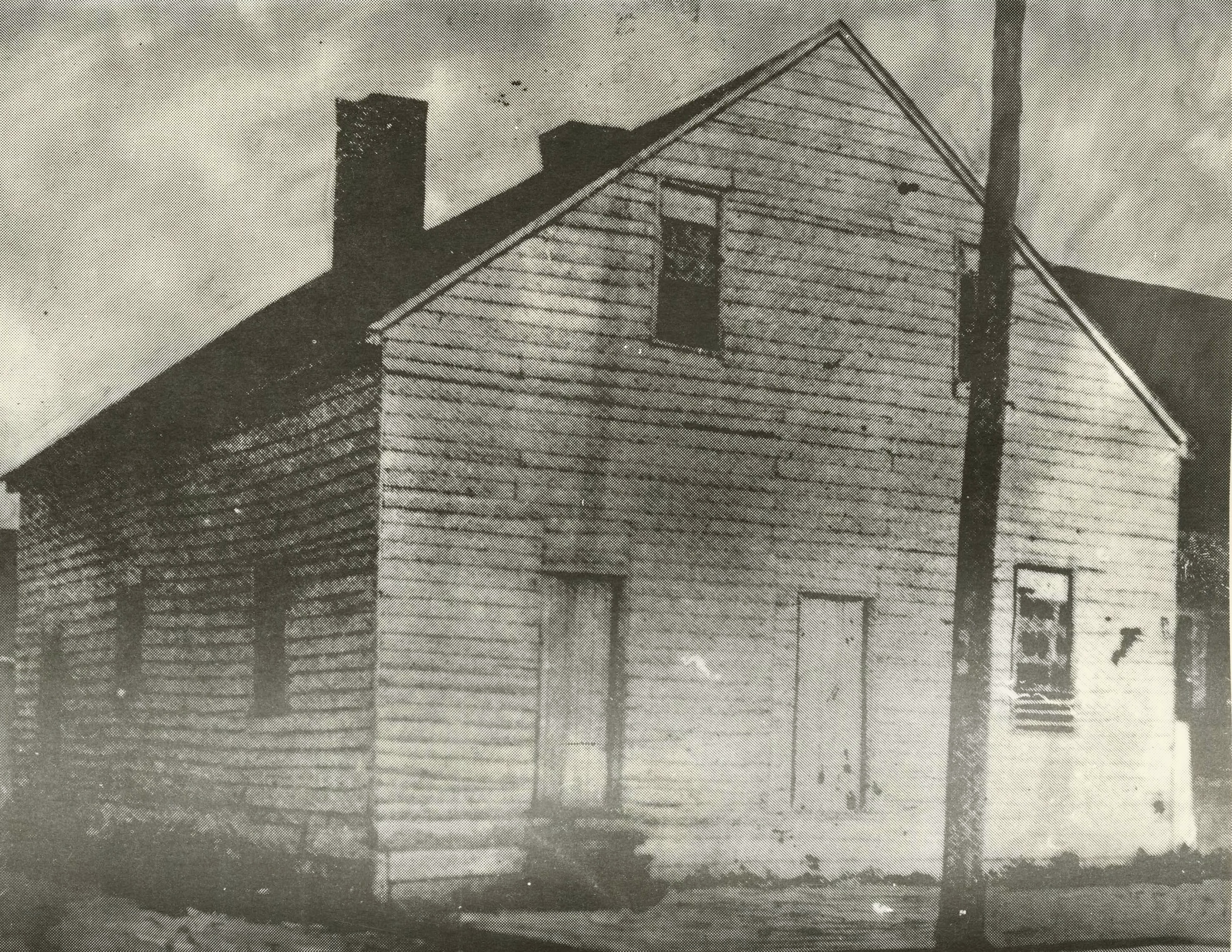
Bell Tavern photograph, taken sometime before the building was condemned in 1913, as published in Paddy Meagher's Ordinary and the Bell Tavern (Memphis and Shelby County Room 976.819 A955p)

- Date unclear (1810s?), Jackson allegedly caned a man who suggested that he was the father of a girl called Sally Meagher who lived near the Third Chickasaw Bluff (now Memphis) and what is now called President's Island; "the account published of this caning by his enemies, some fifteen years later, was very prejudicial to Jackson. It was even stated that several of his friends stood by with cocked pistols, threatening to kill the fellow if he moved. The General gave some grounds for this charge by his excessive fondness for Sally, and the common opinion was that he would either adopt her or do something handsome for her." Paddy Meagher was some kind of vassal to Jackson, although no one entirely understood the arrangement. As for Sally, "Jackson once thrashed a fellow for talking about Sally. Sally was short and thick, and had red hair and a ready wit, all of which she inherited from Paddy. She had talented legs as well as a talented tongue, and could outdance the rest of the young women of the neighborhood. She drew custom to Paddy's bar, where a free and easy manner reigned." In 1822, either the first or second property deed ever registered in Memphis (a town that began as a land speculation of Jackson, John Overton, and James Winchester) was lot 43, recorded in the name of Sally Meagher. Both Paddy Meagher and Sally Meagher eventually died of alcohol dependence-related illnesses.
- In 1828, Jackson and Jesse Benton had a sequel to their 1813 Nashville tavern brawl, only this time the venue was the Bell Tavern in Memphis. The second time around Jesse Benton was beaten.

== Self-defense ==
- In 1833, Robert Beverly Randolph, a U.S. Navy purser who had been fired for "rendering a false financial account," came up to President Jackson at a party in Virginia and "tried to pull his nose." Jackson immediately grabbed his trusty cane and yelled that his age would not prevent him from "punishing a dozen cowardly assassins." Randolph ran off; when he was later caught and charged with assault Jackson told Martin Van Buren to pardon him, apparently because in Jackson's mind, according to historian Bertram Wyatt-Brown, "only physical reprisal was the proper response to insult."
- During an assassination attempt while he was president, at age 67, Jackson "armed only with a cane, he had valiantly charged forth to do battle with an assassin carrying two pistols."

== Threats ==
Threats included on this list should be specific, targeted, and potentially actionable. Rhetorical and figurative flourishes alluding to violence are not currently included. An example of the latter would be Jackson writing about Aaron Burr in January 1807: "If he is a traitor, he is the basest that ever did commit treason, and being tore to pieces, and scattered to the four winds of heaven, would be too good for him." See below for a related counter example, a seemingly specific, targeted, and potentially actionable threat against Secretary of War Henry Dearborn.

- Circa 1781, the orphaned 14-year-old Jackson was living with his uncle Robert Crawford, who "ran a 'public station,' or commissary, to supply the local Patriot army. He soon quarreled with Captain John Galbraith, whom Crawford had placed in charge of the commissary. Galbraith, who was 'of a very proud and haughty disposition,' according to Jackson, 'threatened to chastise' him for some unknown reason. Jackson told the older man that he was old enough 'to know my rights' and that if he tried to discipline him, then the teenager 'would most assuredly Send him to the other world.' Scholar Henrik Booraem has noted that Jackson’s response was out of proportion to the perceived slight and unwarranted given Galbraith's Quaker disposition." After this incident, teenage Jackson was sent to saddler Joseph White, another relative, with whom he lived "for a few months" in 1782.
- Sometime between 1788 and 1794, Jackson reportedly promised to "cut the ears out of [Robards's] head," meaning Lewis Robards. This was in the course of their conflict over the future Mrs. Jackson.

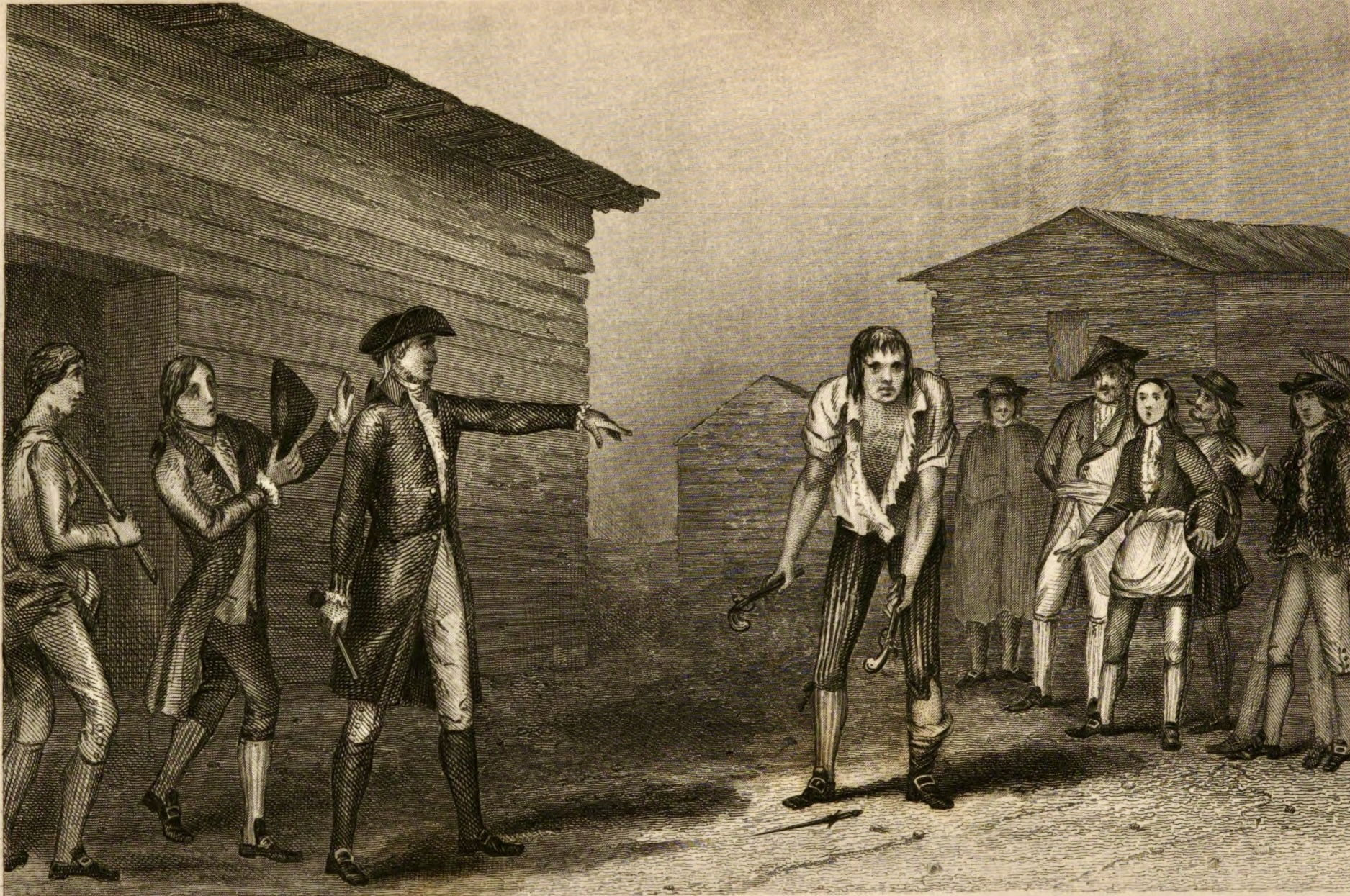
Russell Bean surrendering to Judge Jackson (conjectural illustration published 1844)

- The highest and best use of Jackson's propensity for threatening people was (possibly) in 1798, the first year of his service as a state judge. A man named Russell Bean had returned from an extended trip to the Natchez District, found his wife nursing a child he could not have fathered, and cut off the baby's ears. Despite repeated attempts, the local sheriff failed to successfully execute the arrest warrant for Bean, a hulking and evidently well-armed master gunsmith. Jackson, on hearing this, armed himself with two pistols, found Bean and said something to the effect of "surrender, you infernal villain...or I'll blow you through." In reply, Bean reportedly replied "'I'll surrender to you, Mr. Devil!' and laid down his arms." This anecdote has the savor of folklore and Jackson himself never commented on it. The editors of The Legal Papers of Andrew Jackson (1987) recounted the historiography of the story and reported that they had found a "warrant issued in February 1802 by a justice of the Washington County Court of Pleas and Quarter Sessions for Bean's arrest for having feloniously and on purpose maimed and disfigured an infant child by having cut off both its ears.' The editors have not discovered any documentation linking Jackson with the prosecution of Bean in the Washington County court in 1802."
- 1806: Threatened to kill a "Secretary of War for advising him, accurately, about rumors that connected him with Aaron Burr." Henry Dearborn had questioned Jackson's allegiance because of reports that he was sending two regiments of men to the lower country to aid Burr in his expedition. Jackson wrote to Dearborn about Burr, "But, sir, when prooff [sic] shows him to be a traitor, I would cut his throat with as much pleasure as I would yours on equal testimony."
- Allegedly threatened to hang attorney Jonathan Thompson "to the first tree, or highest tree" for pursuing legal action regarding money allegedly owed Aaron Burr and/or Harman Blennerhassett.
- Allegedly "swore by god he would shoot all his prisoners" if served a writ of habeas corpus for people detained under his declaration of martial law in New Orleans in 1814–15.
- According to the slave narrative of James Robinson, after Jackson used slaves and free people of color to fight and win the Battle of New Orleans, he made a speech recanting promises to free the slaves who had worked and fought under his command and added, "Before a slave of mine should go free, I would put him in a barn and burn him alive."
- Allegedly "threatened personal violence to several of our senators" who were investigating or criticizing his illegal seizure of Florida, an invasion generally known as the First Seminole War. To be specific, in January 1819 he apparently raged to his advisors that he should challenge Congressman Henry Clay to a duel for speaking out against him on the floor of the house and that he would "cut off [Abner] Lacock's ears" for heading the Senate select committee that "methodically gathered and sifted evidence" in the matter.

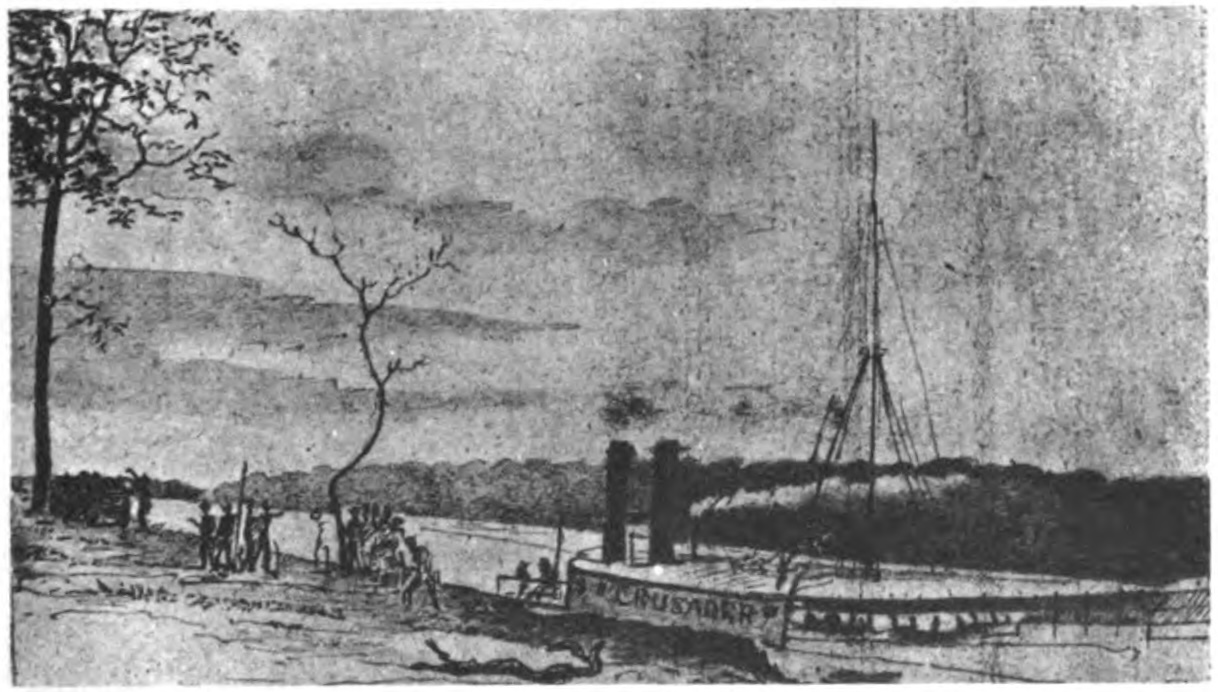
A Mississippi River steamboat painted by Lesueur in 1828

- In 1827, while on his way to New Orleans for an electioneering trip, the steamboat Pocahontas on which he was a passenger was playfully "buzzed" by another steamer. According to James Alexander Hamilton (son of Alexander Hamilton), who had invited himself along on the trip to benefit Van Buren, this made Jackson furious, and Jackson "sent for his rifle" and "shouted to the other steamboat that he would shoot the pilot if he continued to show such disrespect." Mrs. Jackson, who was along for the trip, ably defused the situation.
- Date unclear: Threatened to kill two men who called him "ambitious"

== Other quarrels, evidently non-violent ==
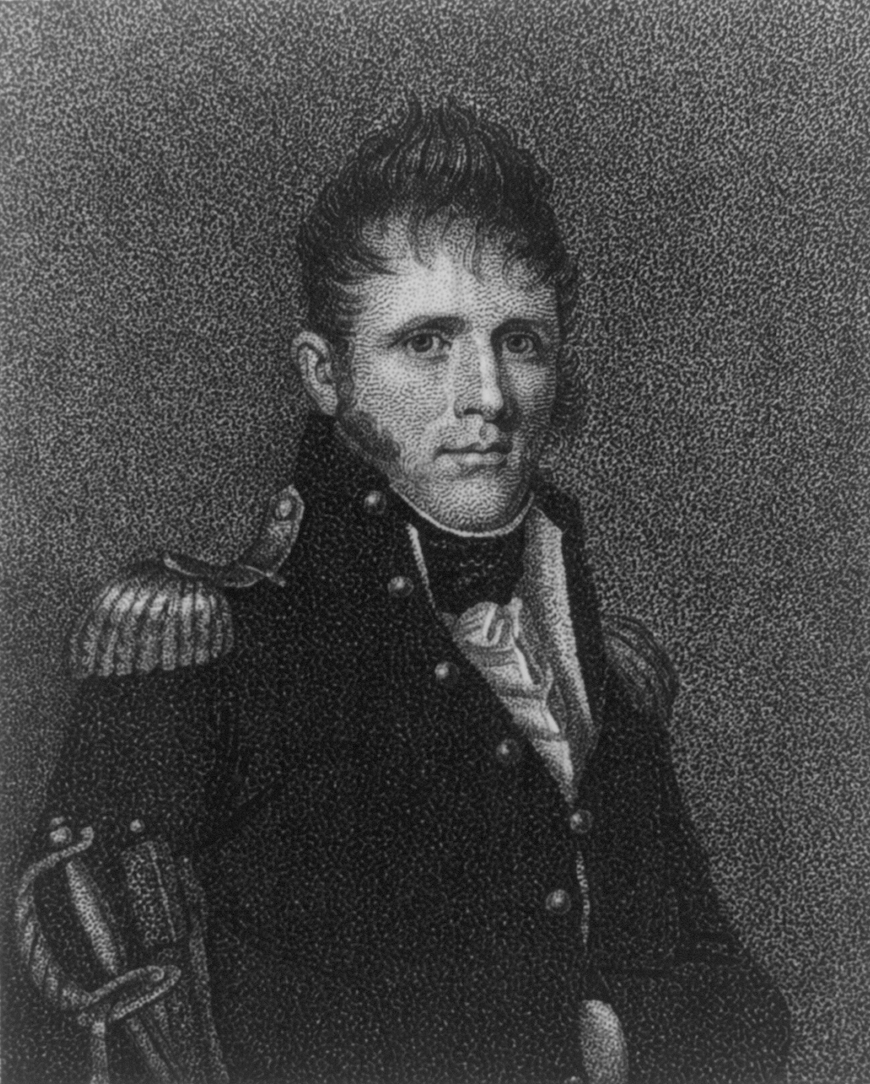
Scott in 1814, around the time when Jackson was quarreling with him

- According to one capsule biography of federal judge John McNairy, McNairy supported the removal of James Robertson as U.S. agent to the Chickasaws, and Jackson opposed it, and "Jackson became so enraged at the attitude of his former friend and fellow student and used such 'unparliamentary language' in regard to him that a breach occurred that time never healed."
- Maybe in the first decade of the century, "turns racer, now about forty years of age" (presumably horse racer), and allegedly, "He makes a race with Dr. Purnell" of Virginia, and "quarrels with, and abuses him without measure"
- In 1817, Jackson "challenged" Winfield Scott, after Scott confirmed that he considered Jackson to have "committed an act of mutiny" when he "ordered disobedience by his troops" to War Department orders. Apparently they did not fight but Jackson called Scott a "hectoring bully" and one of the War Department's "intermeddling pimps and spies." Scott replied that "Jackson could call him whatever he chose...but he should wait until the next war to find out if Scott were truly a coward."
  Eleanora "Ellen" Jackson Kirkman (1774–1850), sister of merchant bankers James Jackson and Washington Jackson, allegedly pointed a gun at Jackson after he stormed into her house
- At some point after 1826, Jackson wanted to argue about an inheritance he felt was due the wife of one of his aides, Richard K. Call. Call's mother-in-law insisted on hating the young man who had eloped with her daughter, and Jackson felt that mother-in-law was wrongly withholding the daughter's inheritance from his friend. So, he stormed into the family's store, marched upstairs and told the mother-in-law, Ellen Kirkman, he wanted to talk. She told him to get out. He would not, thus, "The old lady reached into a drawer, and pulling out a large pistol, cocked, it and leveled it at him, saying 'General Jackson, get out of my house'. The General was a brave man and saw that the old lady with the steel blue eyes and roman nose meant what she said. He said then, 'As you are a woman, I will go, but if you were a man I would not'."

== Second in duels not his own ==
- July 26, 1805: John Dickinson duels Thomas J. Overton; Jackson is Overton's second.
- June 14, 1813: Second to William Carroll in duel with Jesse Benton Jr.
- According to Armstrong's pamphlet, "Jackson is the second to A. Donaldson, the nephew of Mrs. Jackson, who fights with young Mr. Winston at the distance of six feet—neither of the boys over 18 years old. Walter Taylor [sic], since a Senator in Congress, was Winston's second, and knows that the General urged on the fight, and would fix the distance. The dispute was said to be about some act of gallantry. I forbear to make comments, but this has always appeared to me a blood-thirsty transaction." "A. Donaldson" is probably one of the four Alexander Donelsons, possibly the son of John and Mary (Purnell) Donelson, born 1784, died 1814. The young Mr. Winston is possibly kin to Anthony Winston ("four of his sons and two of his sons-in-law served in the Creek Indian war under Gen. Andrew Jackson"); an Anthony Winston Jr. bought Jackson's Big Spring plantation in Alabama in 1822. The Winstons and the Donelsons lived, for a time, in the same Davidson County "neighborhood." The Winstons were kin to the Overtons. Regarding the purported distance of six feet, per the editors of The Papers of Andrew Jackson, "The Thomas J. Overton-John Dickinson duel, in which Jackson served as Overton's second, and the Andrew Jackson-Charles Dickinson duel were both fought at 24 feet."

== See also ==
- List of duels in the United States
- Dueling in the Southern United States
  - List of Confederate duels
- Andrew Jackson and slavery § Violence
- Title and rank in the antebellum U.S. South
- Arrest of Dominic Hall and Louis Louaillier
- Arbuthnot and Ambrister incident
- Josiah Francis (Hillis Hadjo)
- Coffin Handbills
- Legal affairs of Andrew Jackson
- Carya (hickory)
- Andrew Jackson and cockfighting
- Early career of Andrew Jackson

== Sources ==
- n.a. (April 1953). "West Florida, Three Centuries Under Four Flags, Conquest and Disease". Journal of the Florida Medical Association. XXXIX (10). Jacksonville: 749–765. ISSN 0015-4148. OCLC 1569461. PMID 13035023 – via New York Academy of Medicine Library, Internet Archive.
- Arthur, John Preston (1914). Western North Carolina: A History from 1730–1913 – via HathiTrust.
- Burstein, Andrew (2003). The Passions of Andrew Jackson. New York: Alfred A. Knopf. ISBN 978-0-3754-1428-2. LCCN 2002016258. OCLC 49385944.
- Cheathem, Mark R. (2013). Andrew Jackson, Southerner. Baton Rouge, Louisiana: Louisiana State University Press. p. 42. ISBN 978-0-8071-5099-3. LCCN 2012049695. OCLC 858995561. Project MUSE book 26506.
- Cooper, William J. Jr. (2013) [1978]. The South and the Politics of Slavery, 1828–1856 (ebook ed.). Baton Rouge: Louisiana State University Press. ISBN 9780807142653. LCCN 78000751. OCLC 714609691. Project MUSE book 16682.
- Drew, Bettina Lee (December 2001). Master Andrew Jackson: Indian Removal and the Culture of Slavery (Thesis). Yale University. UMI 3030759. ProQuest 3030759
- Heidler, David Stephen; Heidler, Jeanne T. (2018). The rise of Andrew Jackson: myth, manipulation, and the making of modern politics. New York: Basic Books. ISBN 978-0-465-09756-2.
- Jackson, Andrew (1980). Smith, Sam; Owsley, Harriet (eds.). The Papers of Andrew Jackson: Volume I, 1770–1803. University of Tennessee Press. doi:10.7290/utp7943. ISBN 978-0-87049-219-8.
- ——— (1984). Moser, Harold; Macpherson, Sharon (eds.). The Papers of Andrew Jackson, Volume II, 1804–1813. University of Tennessee Press. doi:10.7290/utp3038. ISBN 978-0-87049-441-3.
- ——— (1991). Moser, Harold; Hoth, David; Macpherson, Sharon; Reinbold, John (eds.). The Papers of Andrew Jackson, Volume III, 1814–1815. University of Tennessee Press. doi:10.7290/utp9085. ISBN 978-0-87049-650-9.
- ——— (1994). Moser, Harold; Hoth, David; Hoemann, George (eds.). The Papers of Andrew Jackson: Volume IV, 1816–1820. University of Tennessee Press. doi:10.7290/utp8684. ISBN 978-0-87049-778-0.
- ——— (2010). Feller, Daniel; Coens, Thomas; Moss, Laura-Eve (eds.). The Papers of Andrew Jackson, Volume VIII, 1830. University of Tennessee Press. doi:10.7290/utp6455. ISBN 978-1-57233-715-2.
- James, D. Clayton (1993). Antebellum Natchez. Baton Rouge, Louisiana: Louisiana State Univ. Press. ISBN 978-0-8071-1860-3.
- Lowe, Gabriel L. Jr. (June 1952). "John H. Eaton, Jackson's Campaign Manager". Tennessee Historical Quarterly. 11 (2). Tennessee Historical Society: 99–147. ISSN 0040-3261. JSTOR 42621105.
- Kelly, James C. (1984). "William Gannaway Brownlow, Part I". Tennessee Historical Quarterly. 43 (1): 25–43 [30]. ISSN 0040-3261. JSTOR 42626420.
- Meek, Melinda (1967). "The Life of Archibald Yell, Part I: Early Years". The Arkansas Historical Quarterly. 26 (1): 11–23. doi:10.2307/40018963. ISSN 0004-1823. JSTOR 40018963.
- Opal, J. M. (October 2013). "General Jackson's Passports: Natural Rights and Sovereign Citizens in the Political Thought of Andrew Jackson, 1780s–1820s". Studies in American Political Development. 27 (2): 69–85. doi:10.1017/S0898588X13000060. ISSN 0898-588X.
- Ranck, James B. (1930). "Andrew Jackson and the Burr Conspiracy". Tennessee Historical Magazine. 1 (1): 17–28. ISSN 2333-9012. JSTOR 42638050.
- Remini, Robert V. (1977). Andrew Jackson and the Course of American Empire, 1767–1821. New York: Harper & Row. ISBN 978-0-8018-5912-0. LCCN 77003766. OCLC 1145801830.
- ——— (Fall 1978). "A New York 'Yankee' in Tennessee, 1821". Tennessee Historical Quarterly. 37 (3). Tennessee Historical Society: 278–292. ISSN 0040-3261. JSTOR 42625878.
- ——— (Summer 1991). "Andrew Jackson's Adventures on the Natchez Trace". Southern Quarterly. 29 (4). Hattiesburg, Mississippi: University of Southern Mississippi: 35–42. ISSN 0038-4496. OCLC 1644229.
- Saunt, Claudio (October 2000). "Taking Account of Property: Stratification among the Creek Indians in the Early Nineteenth Century". The William and Mary Quarterly. 57 (4): 733–760. doi:10.2307/2674154. JSTOR 2674154.
- Sellers, Charles Grier Jr. (March 1958). "Andrew Jackson Versus the Historians". The Mississippi Valley Historical Review. 44 (4). Urbana, Illinois: Mississippi Valley Historical Association: 615–634. doi:10.2307/1886599. ISSN 2326-2028. JSTOR 1886599. OCLC 35781793.
- Smith, Elbert B. (February 1958). Catton, Bruce (ed.). "'Now Defend Yourself, You Damned Rascal!'". American Heritage. Vol. IX, no. 2. Illustrated by Marshall Davis. pp. 44–48. ISSN 0002-8738. OCLC 1479963.
- Somit, Albert (December 1948). "Andrew Jackson: Legend and Reality". Tennessee Historical Quarterly. 7 (4): 291–313. ISSN 0040-3261. JSTOR 42620991.
- Walker, Arda (1943). "Andrew Jackson; Planter". The East Tennessee Historical Society's Publications. 15: 19–34. ISSN 0361-6193. LCCN 29013045. OCLC 39989616. FHL 1345525.
- Webb, Gary Alan (Spring 1984). "The Magness Trials" (PDF). Williamson County Historical Journal. 15. Franklin, Tennessee: 21–34. LCCN 86642787. OCLC 14186085.
- Wyatt-Brown, Bertram (1997). "Andrew Jackson's Honor". Journal of the Early Republic. 17 (1): 1–36. doi:10.2307/3124641. ISSN 0275-1275. JSTOR 3124641.
