= Adairville, Kentucky =

- City
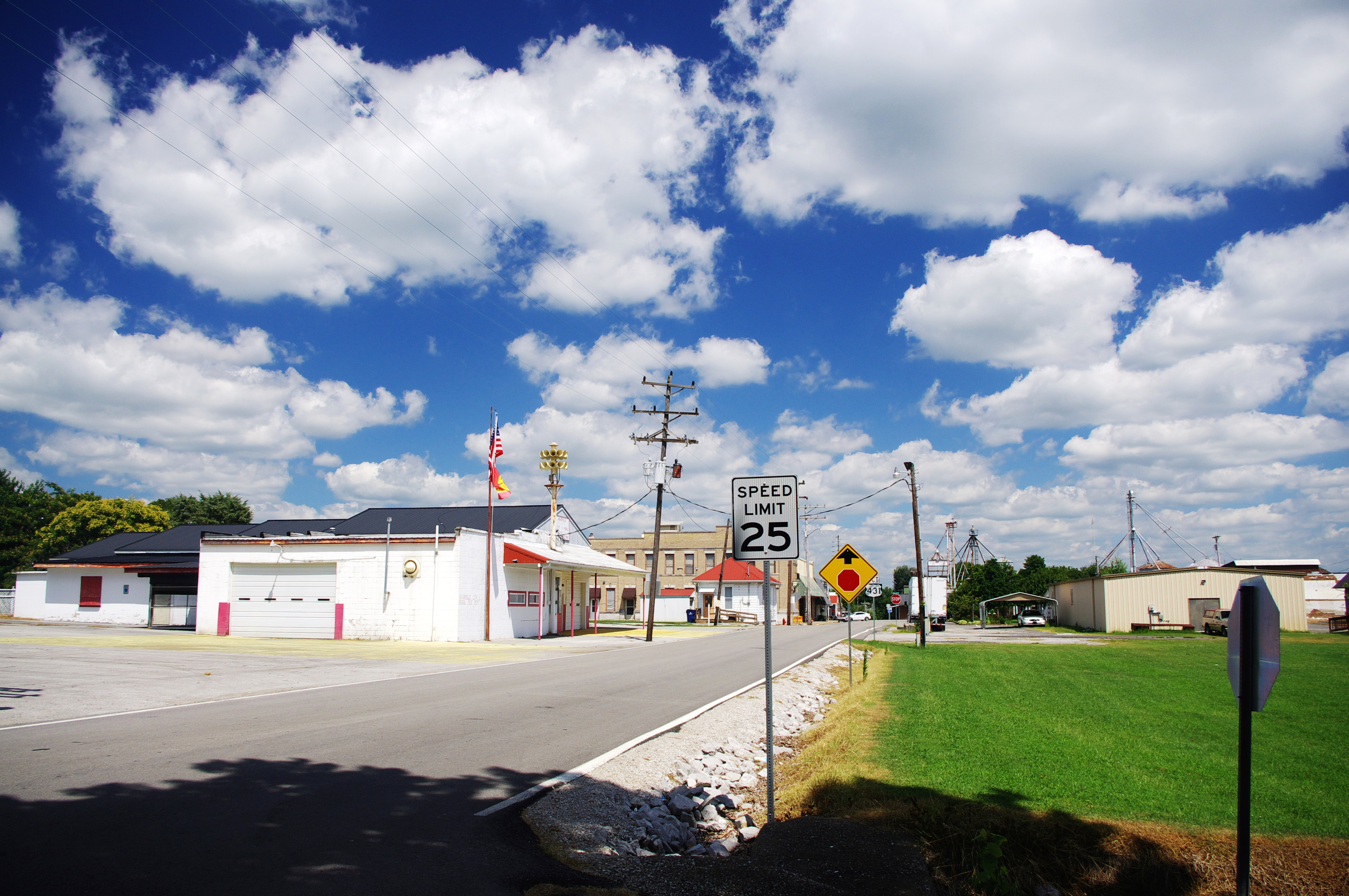
- Gallatin Street (KY 591) in Adairville

- Location within Logan County and Kentucky
- Coordinates: 36°40′7″N 86°51′14″W
- Country: United States
- State: Kentucky
- County: Logan

Government
  - Mayor: Donna Blake

Area
  - Total: 1.18 sq mi (3.05 km^{2})
  - Land: 1.17 sq mi (3.04 km^{2})
  - Water: 0 sq mi (0.00 km^{2})
- Elevation: 600 ft (180 m)

Population (2020)
  - Total: 837
  - Density: 713/sq mi (275/km^{2})
- Time zone: UTC−6 (CST)
  - Summer (DST): UTC−5 (CDT)
- ZIP Code: 42202
- Area code: 270
- FIPS code: 21-00298
- GNIS ID: 485749
- Website: adairvilleky.org

Adairville is a home rule-class city in Logan County, Kentucky, United States. As of the 2020 census, its population was 837.

== History ==
Red River Meeting House was built in 1800 near the town and was the sight of the first religious camp meeting in the United States. It was the birthplace of the Second Great Awakening.

Adairville was settled in the late 18th century, and was originally known as "Dromgooles' Station". When a town was platted in 1818, its name was changed to "Adairsville" in honor the prominent Kentucky politician. Established on January 31, 1833, it was named for Governor John Adair and incorporated by the state assembly on February 7, 1871. The city was incorporated in 1833. The "s" had been dropped from the name by 1881.

In an 1806 duel in Adairville, future president Andrew Jackson killed attorney Charles Dickinson.

== Geography ==
Adairville is in southern Logan County, 1.5 miles (2.4 km) north of the Kentucky–Tennessee state line. The city is concentrated around the intersection of U.S. Route 431 (Main Street) and Kentucky Route 591 (Gallatin Street). US 431 leads north 13 miles (21 km) to Russellville, the Logan county seat, and south 12 miles (19 km) to Springfield, Tennessee. Larger cities in the region are Bowling Green, Kentucky, 36 miles (58 km) to the northeast; Clarksville, Tennessee, the same distance to the southwest; and Nashville, Tennessee, 38 miles (61 km) to the south.

According to the United States Census Bureau, Adairville has a total area of 1.2 square miles (3.0 km^{2}), of which 1.22 acres (4,945 m^{2}), or 0.16%, are water. The South Fork of the Red River passes along the city's southern border, and the Red River proper passes a few miles to the north.

== Demographics ==
Historical population
Census	Pop.	Note	%±
1860	148		—
1870	214		44.6%
1880	476		122.4%
1900	720		—
1910	683		−5.1%
1920	778		13.9%
1930	763		−1.9%
1940	784		2.8%
1950	800		2.0%
1960	848		6.0%
1970	973		14.7%
1980	1,105		13.6%
1990	906		−18.0%
2000	920		1.5%
2010	852		−7.4%
2020	837		−1.8%
U.S. Decennial Census

As of the census of 2000, there were 920 people, 398 households, and 267 families residing in the city. The population density was 704.8 inhabitants per square mile (272.1/km^{2}). There were 431 housing units at an average density of 330.2 per square mile (127.5/km^{2}). The racial makeup of the city was 79.13% White, 18.70% African American, 0.43% Native American, 0.87% from other races, and 0.87% from two or more races. Hispanic or Latino of any race were 2.61% of the population.

There were 398 households, out of which 28.4% had children under the age of 18 living with them, 47.2% were married couples living together, 16.8% had a female householder with no husband present, and 32.9% were non-families. 31.4% of all households were made up of individuals, and 16.3% had someone living alone who was 65 years of age or older. The average household size was 2.31 and the average family size was 2.79.

In the city, the population was spread out, with 23.5% under the age of 18, 7.4% from 18 to 24, 26.4% from 25 to 44, 26.1% from 45 to 64, and 16.6% who were 65 years of age or older. The median age was 40 years. For every 100 females, there were 85.9 males. For every 100 females age 18 and over, there were 79.6 males.

The median income for a household in the city was $27,266, and the median income for a family was $40,139. Males had a median income of $26,618 versus $20,568 for females. The per capita income for the city was $15,490. About 9.6% of families and 13.9% of the population were below the poverty line, including 14.9% of those under age 18 and 21.1% of those age 65 or over.

== Education ==
Adairville has a lending library, a branch of the Logan County Public Library.
