= Andrew Jackson 1828 presidential campaign =

American political campaign

Nashville Central Committee, and others
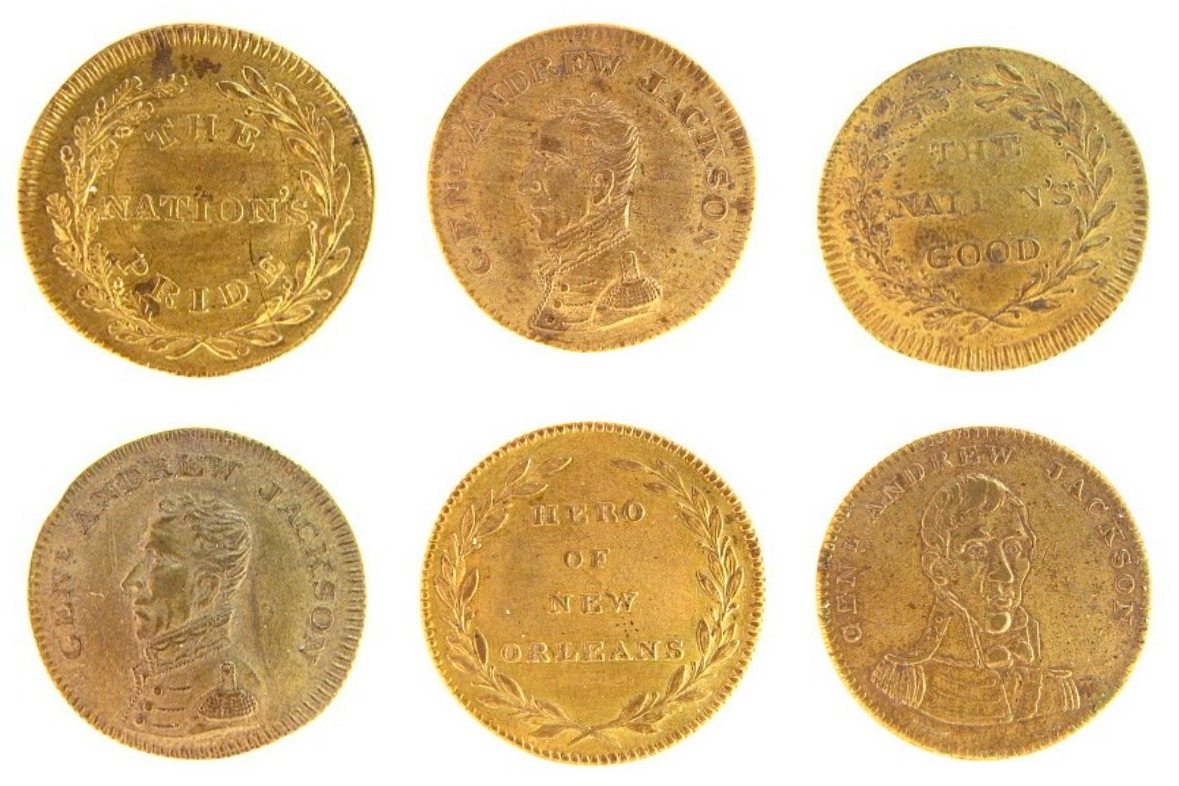
- Campaign: U.S. presidential election, 1828
- Candidate: Maj. Gen. Andrew Jackson; U.S. Senator from Tennessee (1797–1798, 1823–1825); John C. Calhoun; 7th Vice President of the United States (1825–1832)
- Affiliation: Democratic Party
- Status: Won general election
- Headquarters: Tennessee
- Key people: John Overton, John Eaton (politician), William Berkeley Lewis, Blackhorse Harry Lee, and others
- Slogan(s): Jackson and Reform

In 1828, Andrew Jackson, who had lost the 1824 election in a runoff in the United States House of Representatives, despite winning both the popular vote and the electoral vote by significant margins, ran for President of the United States. He had been nominated by the Tennessee state legislature in 1825, and did not face any opposition from Democratic candidates. Jackson launched his campaign on January 8, 1828, with a major speech on the 13th anniversary of the Battle of New Orleans from 1815, thus marking the birth of the Democratic Party. Jackson accepted John C. Calhoun, incumbent vice president under John Quincy Adams, as his running mate.

John Quincy Adams was an unpopular President from the beginning of his term, and the Democratic Party, which was just beginning to emerge as a political force, mobilized behind Jackson, a popular war hero who had served in the Battle of New Orleans. Despite his successes as a member of both the House of Representatives and the Senate, as well as the Military Governor of Florida, Jackson had been born in relatively modest surroundings in rural Carolina, which appealed to the majority of Americans, who were small farmers who benefited from the introduction of Universal male suffrage from the 1820s to the 1840s. This expansion of voting rights helped both major political parties (the Democrats and the National Republicans) canvass voters and expand the popular vote.

The campaign was marked by large amounts of "mudslinging." Jackson's marriage, for example, came in for vicious attack. The Robards–Donelson–Jackson relationship controversy also played a major role. Charles Hammond, in his Cincinnati Gazette, asked: "Ought a convicted adulteress and her paramour husband be placed in the highest offices of this free and Christian land?" Jackson also came under heavy attack as a slave trader who bought and sold slaves and moved them about in defiance of modern standards or morality. (He was not attacked for merely owning slaves used in plantation work.) The Coffin Handbills attacked Jackson for his courts-martial, execution of deserters and massacres of Indian villages, and also his habit of dueling.

== Background ==
=== Election of 1824 ===
The Tennessee legislature nominated Jackson for President in 1822. It also elected him U.S. Senator again. By 1817, the Democratic-Republican Party had become the only functioning national party. Its presidential candidates had been chosen by an informal congressional nominating caucus, but this had become unpopular. In 1824, most of the Democratic-Republicans in Congress boycotted the caucus. Those who attended backed Treasury Secretary William H. Crawford for president and Albert Gallatin for vice president. A Pennsylvania convention nominated Jackson for President a month later, stating that the irregular caucus ignored the "voice of the people" and was a "vain hope that the American people might be thus deceived into a belief that he [Crawford] was the regular democratic candidate". Gallatin criticized Jackson as "an honest man and the idol of the worshipers of military glory, but from incapacity, military habits, and habitual disregard of laws and constitutional provisions, altogether unfit for the office".

Besides Jackson and Crawford, Secretary of State John Quincy Adams and House Speaker Henry Clay were also candidates. Jackson received the most popular votes (but not a majority, and four states had no popular ballot). The electoral votes were split four ways, with Jackson having a plurality. Because no candidate received a majority, the election was decided by the House of Representatives, which chose Adams. Jackson supporters denounced this result as a "corrupt bargain" because Clay gave his state's support to Adams, who subsequently appointed Clay as Secretary of State. As none of Kentucky's electors had initially voted for Adams, and Jackson had won the popular vote, some Kentucky politicians criticized Clay for violating the will of the people in return for personal political favors. Jackson's defeat burnished his political credentials, however; many voters believed the "man of the people" had been robbed by the "corrupt aristocrats of the East".

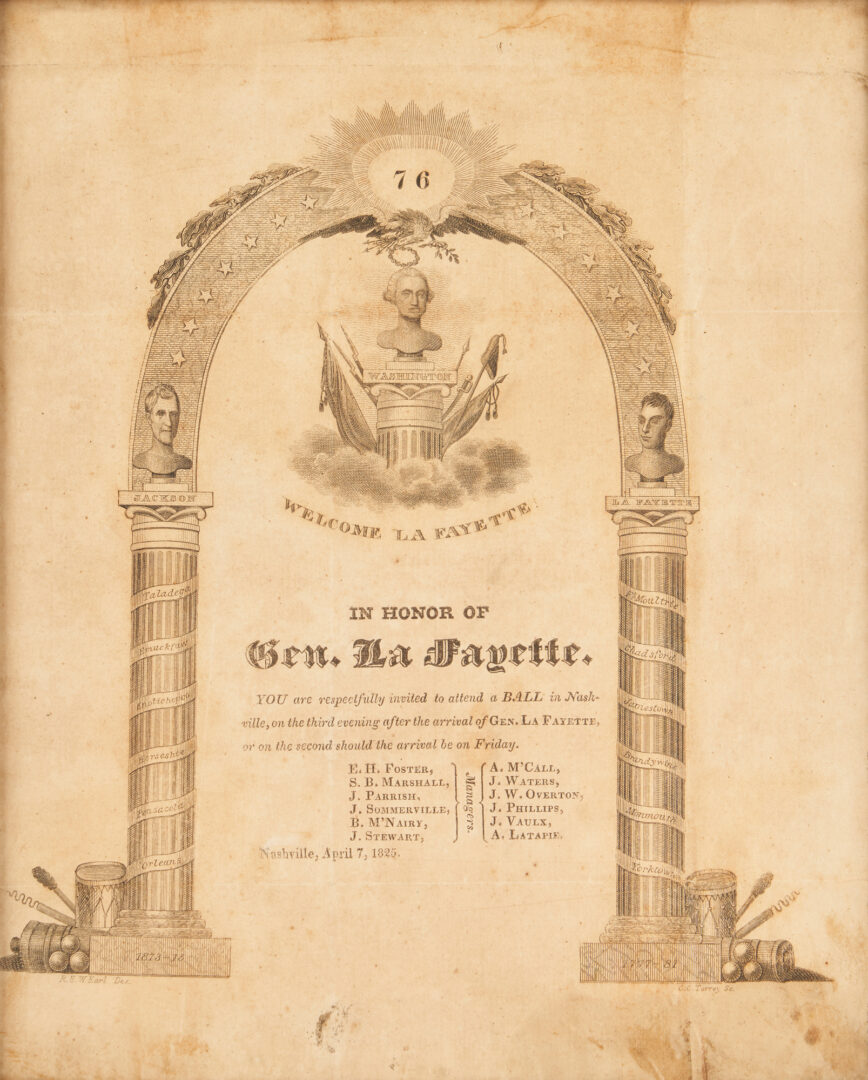
Ralph E. W. Earl (who was a nephew-by-marriage has been described as Jackson's "court painter") designed this invitation to a ball at Nashville in honor of the visit of the Marquis de Lafayette to the United States in 1825; "the invitation occupied the space between two fine columns, one supporting a bust of Jackson and entwined with a ribbon bearing the names of his battles and having the figures 1813–15 inscribed on the pedestal; the other supporting a bust of Lafayette and bearing likewise the names of his battles and the figures 1777–81. At the base of the columns were laying cannon and cannon balls, drums, torches, etc. Above was the sun with 76 in the center, and around were the thirteen stars in the sky. Just below the sun was an eagle holding arrows in one claw and the branch of peace in the other, and placing with its beak a laurel wreath upon the head of Washington's bust, which was supported by a column in the midst of clouds and encircled by swords, spears, banners and the cap of liberty."

Andrew Jackson won a plurality of electoral votes in the election of 1824, but still lost to John Quincy Adams when the election was deferred to the House of Representatives (by the terms of the Twelfth Amendment to the United States Constitution, a presidential election in which no candidate wins a majority of the electoral vote is decided by the House of Representatives). Henry Clay, unsuccessful candidate and Speaker of the House at the time, despised Jackson, in part due to their fight for Western votes during the election, and he chose to support Adams, which led to Adams being elected president. A few days after the election, Adams named Clay his Secretary of State, a position which at that time often led to the presidency. Jackson and his followers immediately accused Clay and Adams of striking a "corrupt bargain," and they continued to lambast the president until the 1828 election.

=== Adams presidency ===
In a prelude to the presidential election, the Jacksonians bolstered their numbers in Congress in the 1826 congressional elections; Jackson ally Andrew Stevenson was chosen as the new Speaker of the House of Representatives in 1827 over Adams ally Speaker John W. Taylor.

The Tariff of 1828, also known as the Tariff of Abominations, had been signed into law earlier in the year, increasing tariff rates to above 60%. Though it had narrowly passed in the House, it was unpopular with the Southern states as they imported materials and goods from abroad. Jackson and the Democrats opposed the tariff, and the unpopularity of the bill led to a division of the vote into two main sections: the Northern, minority Adams vote, and the Southern, majority Jackson vote. Jackson also personally appealed to the Western states, and he carried their electoral votes as well.

=== Democratic Party nomination ===
Democratic candidate:

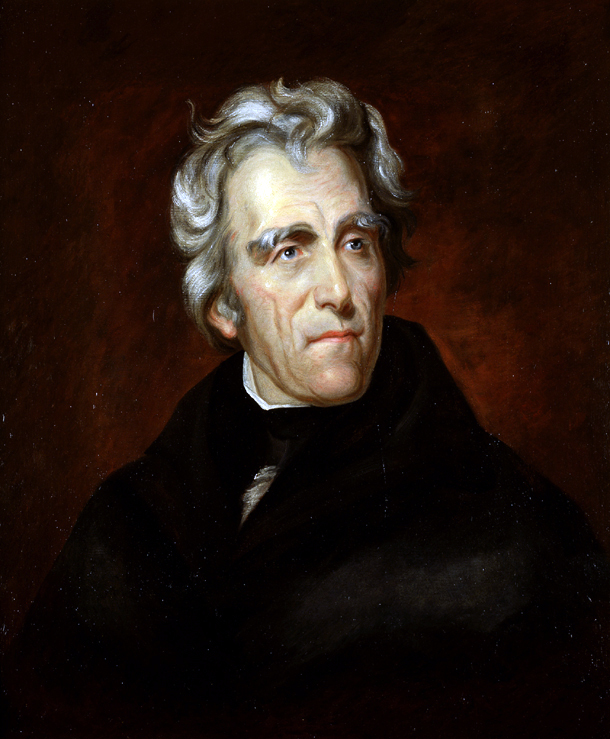
Andrew Jackson
(Tennessee) former senator and member of the House of Representatives, former general

Within months after the inauguration of John Quincy Adams in 1825, the Tennessee legislature re-nominated Jackson for president, thus setting the stage for a re-match between these two very different politicians three years hence. No nominating caucus was held. Jackson accepted the incumbent Vice-president John C. Calhoun as his running mate. Jackson's supporters called themselves Democrats, thus marking the evolution of Jefferson's Democratic-Republican Party into the modern Democratic Party.

== Campaign ==
=== Jefferson's opinion ===
Thomas Jefferson wrote favorably in response to Jackson in December 1823 and extended an invitation to his estate of Monticello: "I recall with pleasure the remembrance of our joint labors while in the Senate together in times of great trial and of hard battling, battles indeed of words, not of blood, as those you have since fought so much for your own glory & that of your country; with the assurance that my attempts continue undiminished, accept that of my great respect & consideration."

Jefferson wrote in dismay at the outcome of the contingent election of 1825 to congressional caucus nominee William H. Crawford, saying that he had hoped to congratulate Crawford but "events had not been what we had wished."

In the next election, Jackson's and Adams' supporters saw value in establishing the opinion of Jefferson in regards to their respective candidates and against their opposition. Jefferson died on July 4, 1826, on the same day as his predecessor, John Adams.

A goal of the pro-Adams press was to depict Jackson as a "mere military chieftain." Edward Coles recounted that Jefferson told him in a conversation in August 1825 that he feared the popular enthusiasm for Jackson: "It has caused me to doubt more than anything that has occurred since our Revolution." Coles used the opinion of Thomas Gilmer to back himself up; Gilmer said Jefferson told him at Monticello before the election of Adams in 1825, "One might as well make a sailor of a cock, or a soldier of a goose, as a President of Andrew Jackson." Daniel Webster, who was also at Monticello at the time, made the same report. Webster recorded that Jefferson told him in December 1824 that Jackson was a dangerous man unfit for the presidency. Historian Sean Wilentz described Webster's account of the meeting as "not wholly reliable." Biographer Robert V. Remini said that Jefferson "had no great love for Jackson."

=== Controversy ===
Thomas Jefferson in 1821, by Thomas Sully

Gilmer accused Coles of misrepresentation, for Jefferson's opinion had changed, Gilmer said. Jefferson's son-in-law, former Virginia Governor Thomas Mann Randolph Jr., said in 1826 that Jefferson had a "strong repugnance" to Henry Clay. Randolph publicly stated that Jefferson became friendly to Jackson's candidacy as early as the summer of 1825, perhaps because of the "corrupt bargain" charge, and thought of Jackson as "an honest, sincere, clear-headed and strong-minded man; of the soundest political principles" and "the only hope left" to reverse the increasing powers assumed by the federal government. Others said the same thing, but Coles could not believe Jefferson's opinion had changed.

In 1827, Virginia Governor William B. Giles released a letter from Jefferson meant to be kept private to Thomas Ritchie's Richmond Enquirer. It was written after Adams' first annual message to Congress and it contained an attack from Jefferson on the incumbent administration. Giles said Jefferson's alarm was with the usurpation of the rights of the states, not with a "military chieftain." Jefferson wrote, "take together the decisions of the federal court, the doctrines of the President, and the misconstructions of the constitutional compact acted on by the legislature of the federal bench, and it is but too evident, that the three ruling branches of that department are in combination to strip their colleagues, the State authorities, of the powers reserved by them, and to exercise themselves all functions foreign and domestic." Of the Federalists, he continued, "But this opens with a vast accession of strength from their younger recruits, who, having nothing in them of the feelings or principles of '76, now look to a single and splendid government of an aristocracy, founded on banking institutions, and moneyed incorporations under the guise and cloak of their favored branches of manufactures, commerce and navigation, riding and ruling over the plundered ploughman and beggared yeomanry." The Jacksonians and states' rights men heralded its publication; the Adams men felt it a symptom of senility. Giles omitted a prior letter of Jefferson's praise of Adams for his role in the embargo of 1808. Thomas Jefferson Randolph soon collected and published Jefferson's correspondence.

== Results ==
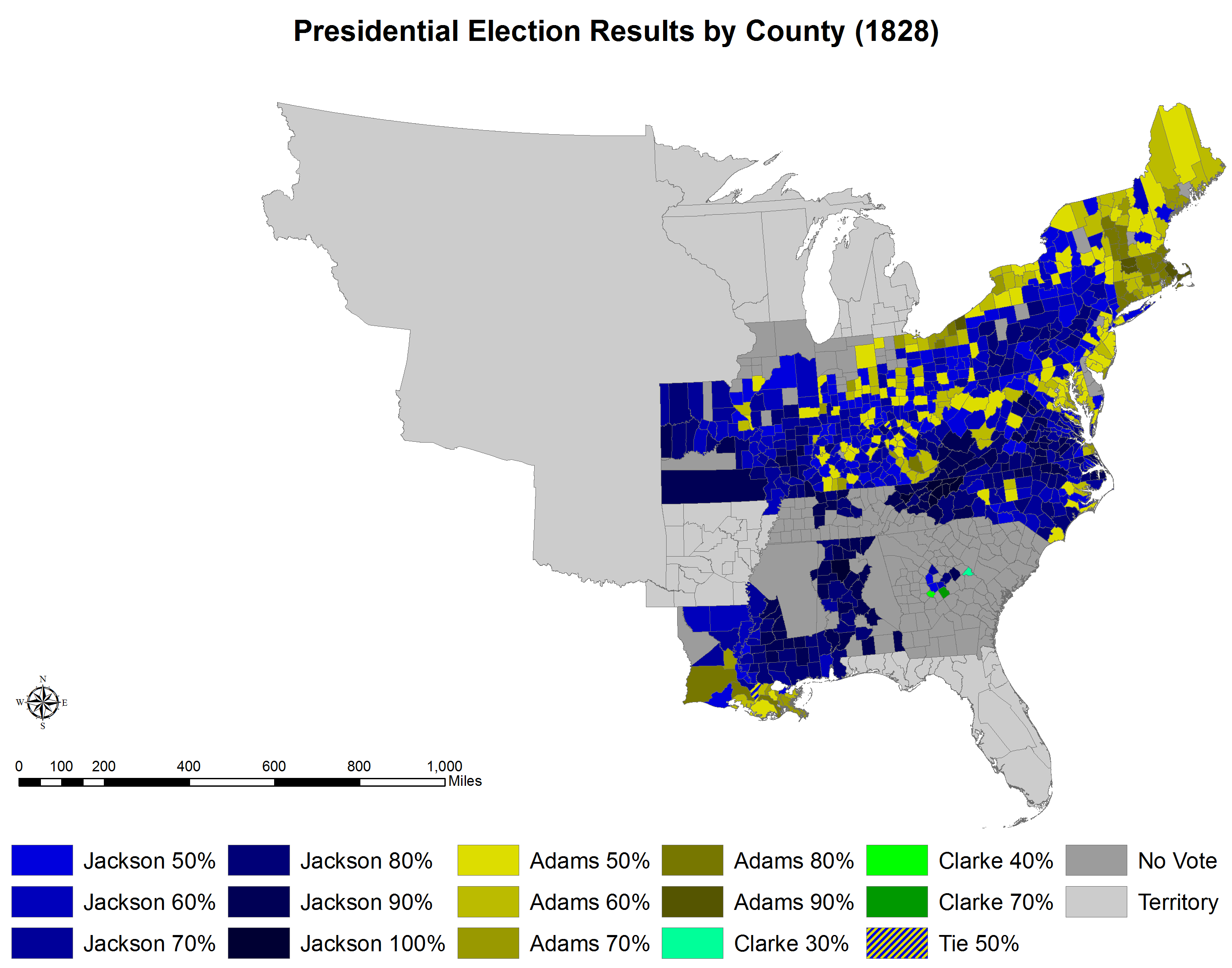
Results by county explicitly indicating the percentage of the winning candidate in each county. Shades of blue are for Jackson (Democrat) and shades of yellow are for Adams (National Republican).

The selection of electors began on October 31 with elections in Ohio and Pennsylvania and ended on November 13 with elections in North Carolina. The Electoral College met on December 3. Adams won almost exactly the same states that his father had won in the election of 1800: the New England states, New Jersey, and Delaware. In addition, Adams picked up Maryland. Jackson won everything else, which resulted in a landslide victory for him.

=== Popular and electoral vote ===
Electoral results
Presidential candidate	Party	Home state	Popular vote^{(a)}		Electoral vote	Running mate		
Presidential candidate	Party	Home state	Count	Percentage	Electoral vote	Vice-presidential candidate	Home state	Electoral vote
Andrew Jackson	Democratic	Tennessee	642,553	56.0%	178	John Caldwell Calhoun (Incumbent)	South Carolina	171
Andrew Jackson	Democratic	Tennessee	642,553	56.0%	178	William Smith	South Carolina	7
John Quincy Adams (Incumbent)	National Republican	Massachusetts	500,897	43.6%	83	Richard Rush	Pennsylvania	83
Other			4,568	0.4%	—	Other		—
Total			1,148,018	100%	261			261
Needed to win					131			131

Source (Popular Vote): Leip, David. "1828 Presidential Election Results". Dave Leip's Atlas of U.S. Presidential Elections. Source (Electoral Vote): "Electoral College Box Scores 1789–1996". National Archives and Records Administration.

^{(a)} The popular vote figures exclude Delaware and South Carolina. In both of these states, the Electors were chosen by the state legislatures rather than by popular vote.

== Aftermath ==
Rachel Jackson had been having chest pains throughout the campaign, and she became aggravated by the personal attacks on her marriage. She became ill and died on December 22, 1828. Jackson accused the Adams campaign, and Henry Clay even more so, of causing her death, saying, "I can and do forgive all my enemies. But those vile wretches who have slandered her must look to God for mercy." Jackson's campaigners fired back and had also slandered Adams by claiming that while serving as Minister to Russia, Adams had procured a young girl to serve as a prostitute for Emperor Alexander I. They also stated that Adams had a billiard table in the White House and that he had charged the government for it. The truth of the matter of Adams and the Czar was that a young female servant to Adams wife had written a letter which had been censored by the Russian postal authorities; Czar Alexander had expressed a curiosity to publicly meet and talk with the letter writer and Adams obliged. In regard to the billiard table, Adams indeed had repaired his billiard table-the bill for repair had been accidentally included in a routine White House expense accounts (Adams was also criticized for having a chess set). In regard to Rachel Jackson, Adams had not authorized his supporters to attack her- something that Jackson himself acknowledged to Adams. Nevertheless, personal relations between Adams and Jackson were cold and distant; for example when Adams's alma mater, Harvard, presented Jackson with Doctor of Laws of Degree, Adams wrote to his distant cousin (Harvard's President) expressing his annoyance that Harvard had given a degree to a "Barbarian." [I.e someone who did not know the classic languages of Greek and Latin; likewise Jackson had not studied law in college but had learned it as a law clerk] Ironically, Adams, while putting together his presidential cabinet, had considered Jackson for the position of Secretary of War (Jackson declined).

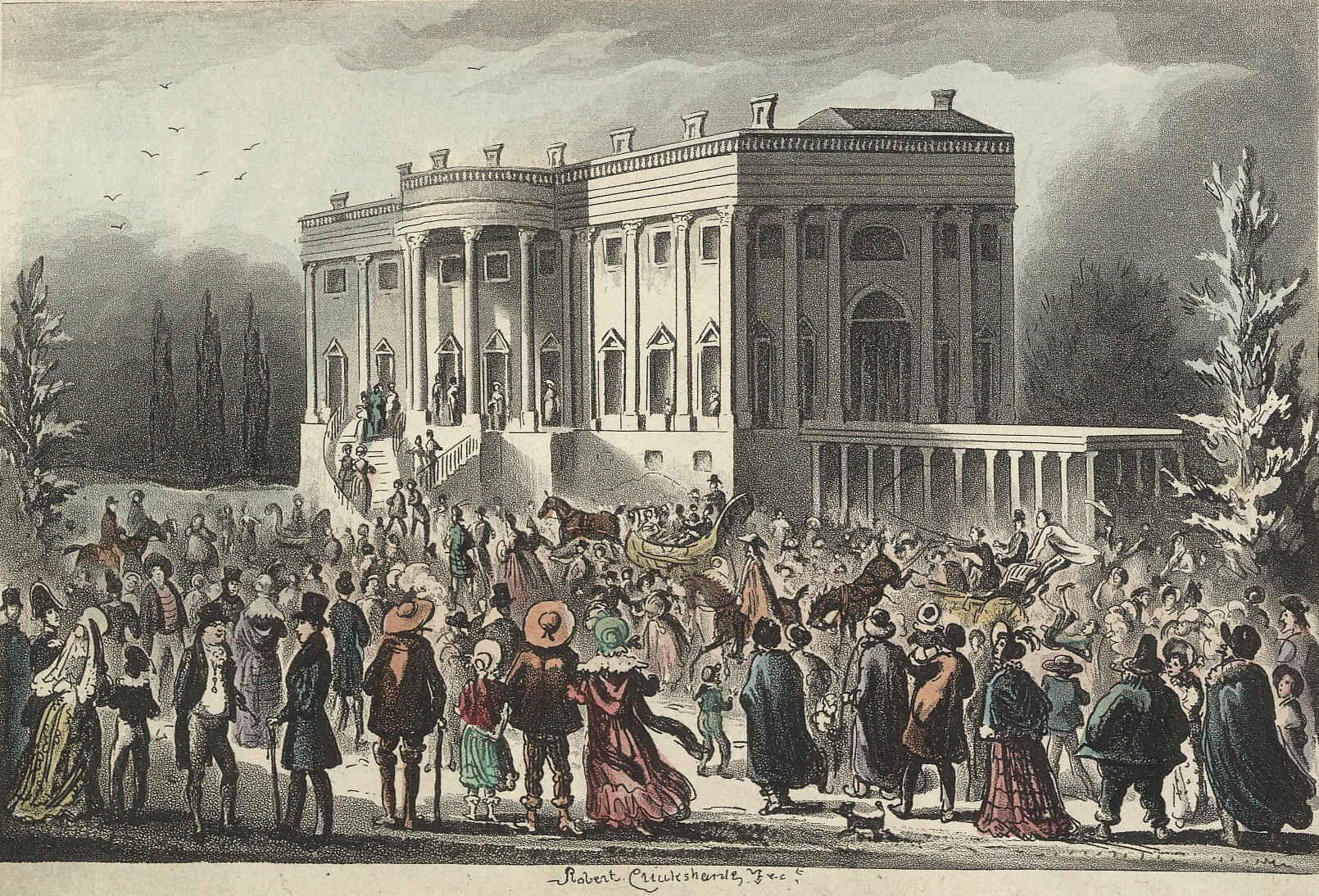
1829 caricature by Robert Cruikshank of U.S. President Andrew Jackson's inauguration

When the results of the election were announced, a mob entered the White House, damaging the furniture and lights. Jackson escaped through the back and large punch bowls were set up to lure the crowd outside. Conservatives were horrified at this event, and held it up as a portent of terrible things to come from the first Democratic president.

Andrew Jackson was sworn in as president on March 4, 1829.

== See also ==
- Jacksonian democracy
