= 1828 United States presidential election in Maine =

- October 31 – December 2, 1828
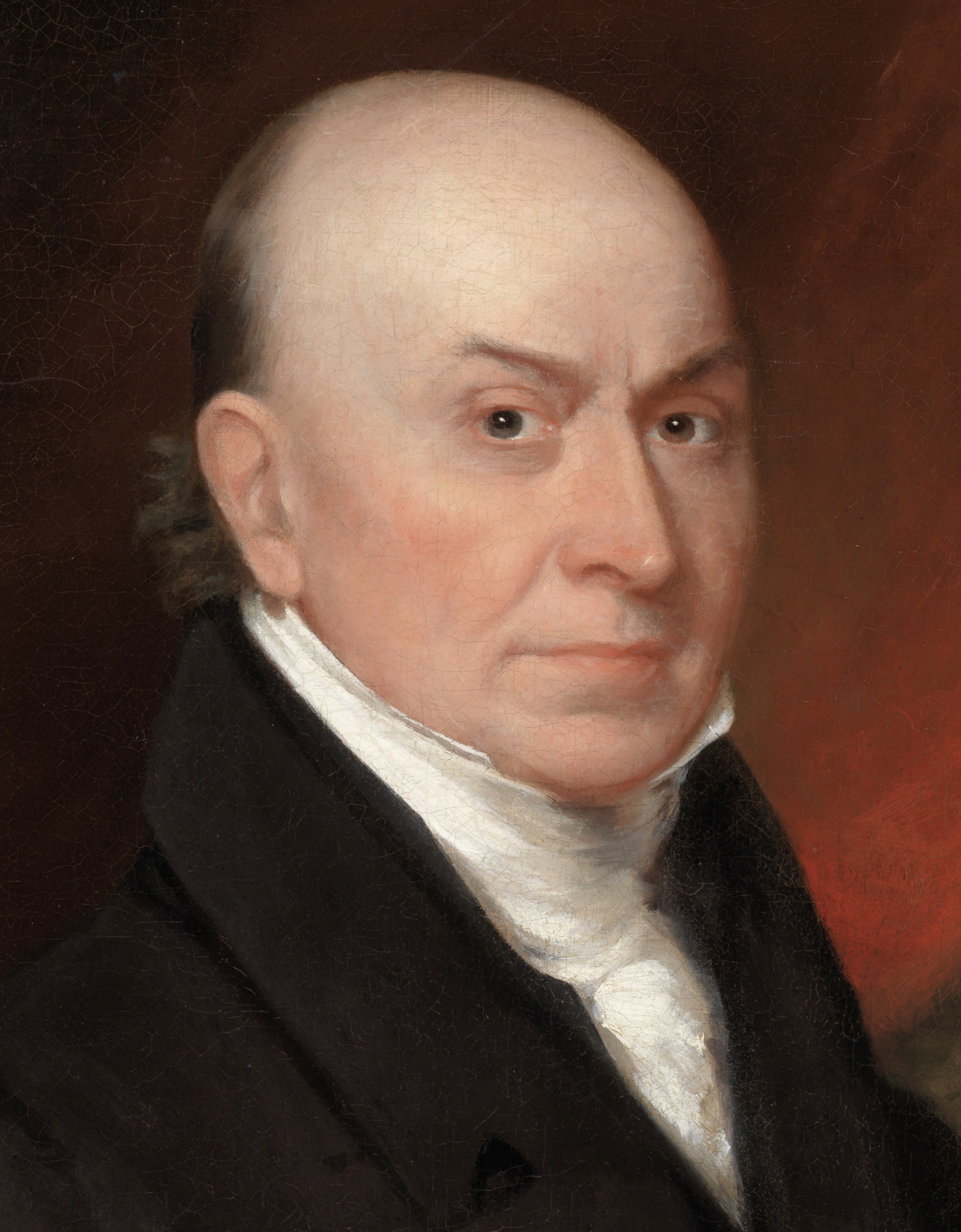

Nominee	John Quincy Adams	Andrew Jackson
Party	National Republican	Democratic
Home state	Massachusetts	Tennessee
Running mate	Richard Rush	John C. Calhoun
Electoral vote	8	1
Popular vote	20,773	13,927
Percentage	59.71%	40.03%
County results
Adams
50–60%
60–70%
70–80%
Jackson
50–60%
No Data/Vote
President before election
John Quincy Adams
Democratic-Republican
Elected President
Andrew Jackson
Democratic

The 1828 United States presidential election in Maine took place between October 31 and December 2, 1828, as part of the 1828 United States presidential election. Voters chose nine representatives, or electors to the Electoral College, who voted for the president and vice president.

Maine voted for the National Republican candidate, John Quincy Adams, over the Democratic candidate, Andrew Jackson. Adams won Maine by a margin of 19.68%. Adams received eight electoral votes and Jackson received one.

With 59.71% of the popular vote, Maine would prove to be Adams' fifth strongest state in the 1828 election after Rhode Island, Massachusetts, Vermont and Connecticut.

This was the only time prior to the 2016 election (when Republican nominee Donald Trump received one of the state's four votes) that an electoral vote split occurred in Maine.

== Results ==
1828 United States presidential election in Maine
Party	Candidate	Votes	Percentage	Electoral votes
National Republican	John Quincy Adams (incumbent)	20,773	59.71%	8
Democratic	Andrew Jackson	13,927	40.03%	1
N/A	Other	89	0.26%	0
Totals		34,789	100.0%	9

== See also ==
- United States presidential elections in Maine
