= 1828 United States presidential election in Connecticut =

- October 31 – December 2, 1828
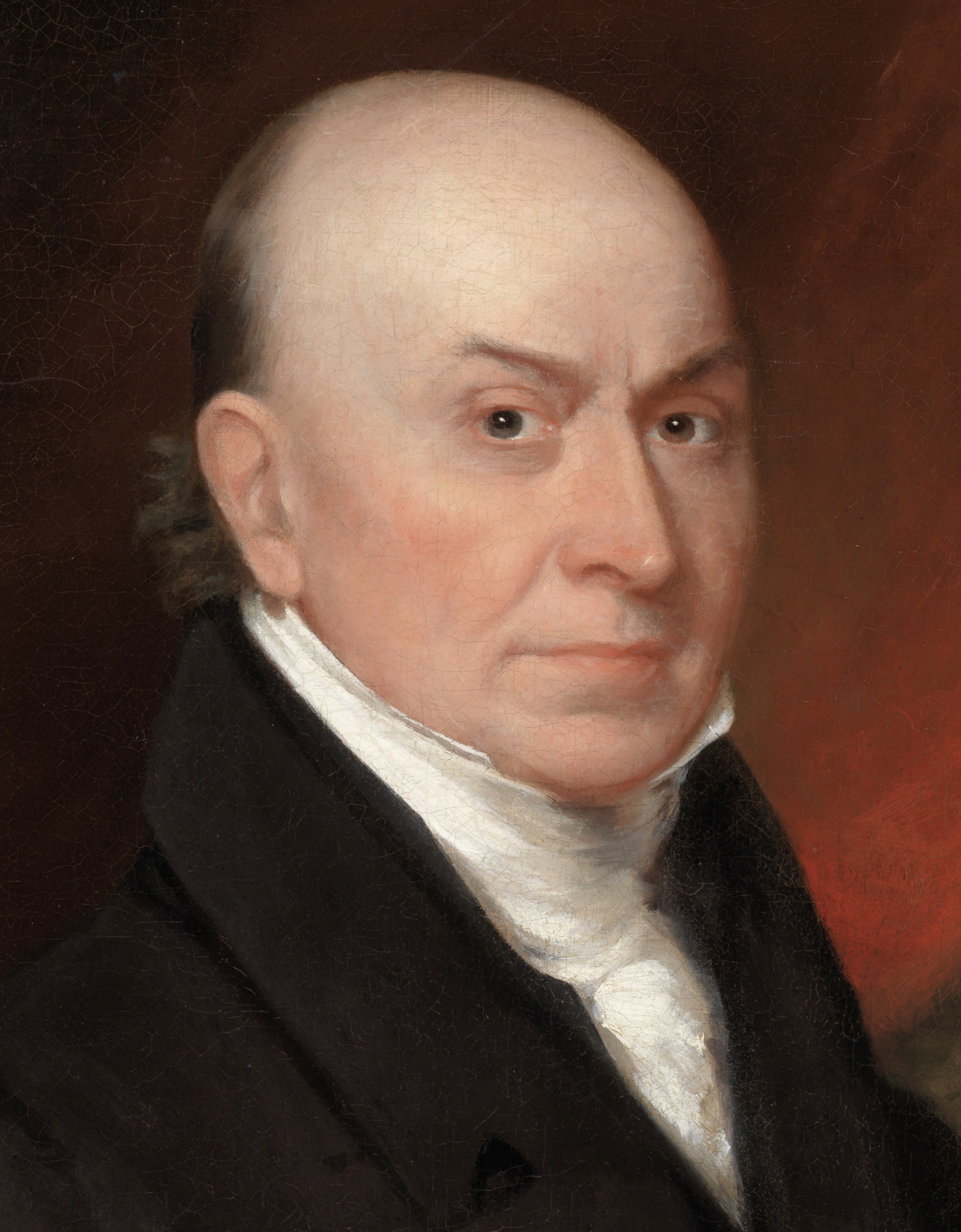

Nominee	John Quincy Adams	Andrew Jackson
Party	National Republican	Democratic
Home state	Massachusetts	Tennessee
Running mate	Richard Rush	John C. Calhoun
Electoral vote	8	0
Popular vote	13,829	4,448
Percentage	71.36%	22.95%

Quincy Adams
50–60%
60–70%
70–80%
80–90%
90–100%
Jackson
50–60%
No Data/Vote:

The 1828 United States presidential election in Connecticut took place between October 31 and December 2, 1828, as part of the 1828 United States presidential election. Voters chose eight representatives, or electors to the Electoral College, who voted for President and Vice President.

Connecticut voted for the National Republican candidate, John Quincy Adams, over the Democratic candidate, Andrew Jackson. Adams won Connecticut by a margin of 48.41%.

With 71.36% of the popular vote, Connecticut would prove to be Adams' fourth strongest state in the 1828 election after Rhode Island, Massachusetts and Vermont.

== Results ==
1828 United States presidential election in Connecticut
Party	Candidate	Votes	Percentage	Electoral votes
National Republican	John Quincy Adams (incumbent)	13,829	71.36%	8
Democratic	Andrew Jackson	4,448	22.95%	0
N/A	Other	1,101	5.68%	0
Totals		19,378	100.0%	8

== See also ==
- United States presidential elections in Connecticut
