= Adams vs. Jackson =

Adams vs. Jackson may refer to one of two United States presidential elections between John Quincy Adams and Andrew Jackson:

- 1824 United States presidential election, won by John Quincy Adams against Andrew Jackson, William H. Crawford, and Henry Clay
- 1828 United States presidential election, won by Andrew Jackson against John Quincy Adams
