= Swint =

Swint is a surname. Notable people with the surname include:

- John Joseph Swint (1879–1962), American Roman Catholic prelate
- Kerwin Swint (born 1962), American political scientist and author
