= 1828 United States presidential election in Delaware =

- October 31 – December 2, 1828
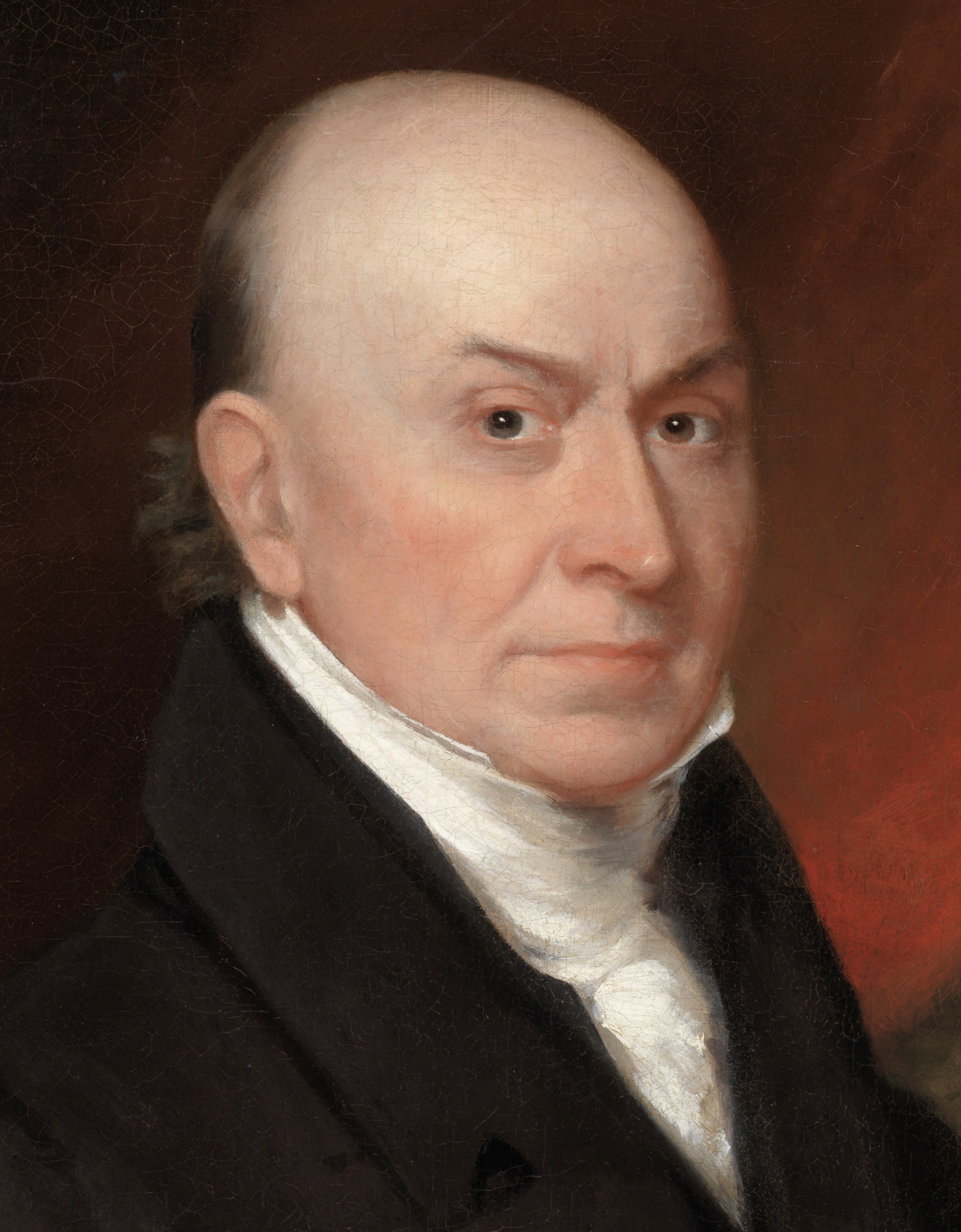

Nominee	John Quincy Adams	Andrew Jackson
Party	National Republican	Democratic
Home state	Massachusetts	Tennessee
Running mate	Richard Rush	John C. Calhoun
Electoral vote	3	0

The 1828 United States presidential election in Delaware took place between October 31 and December 2, 1828, as part of the 1828 United States presidential election. Voters chose three representatives, or electors to the Electoral College, who voted for President and Vice President.

Delaware cast three electoral votes for the National Republican candidate, John Quincy Adams, over the Democratic candidate, Andrew Jackson. These electors were elected by the Delaware General Assembly, the state legislature, rather than by popular vote.

== Results ==
1828 United States presidential election in Delaware
Party	Candidate	Votes	Percentage	Electoral votes
National Republican	John Quincy Adams (incumbent)	–	–	3
Democratic	Andrew Jackson	–	–	0
Totals		–	–	3

== See also ==
- United States presidential elections in Delaware
