= 1828 United States presidential election in Tennessee =

- October 31 – December 2, 1828

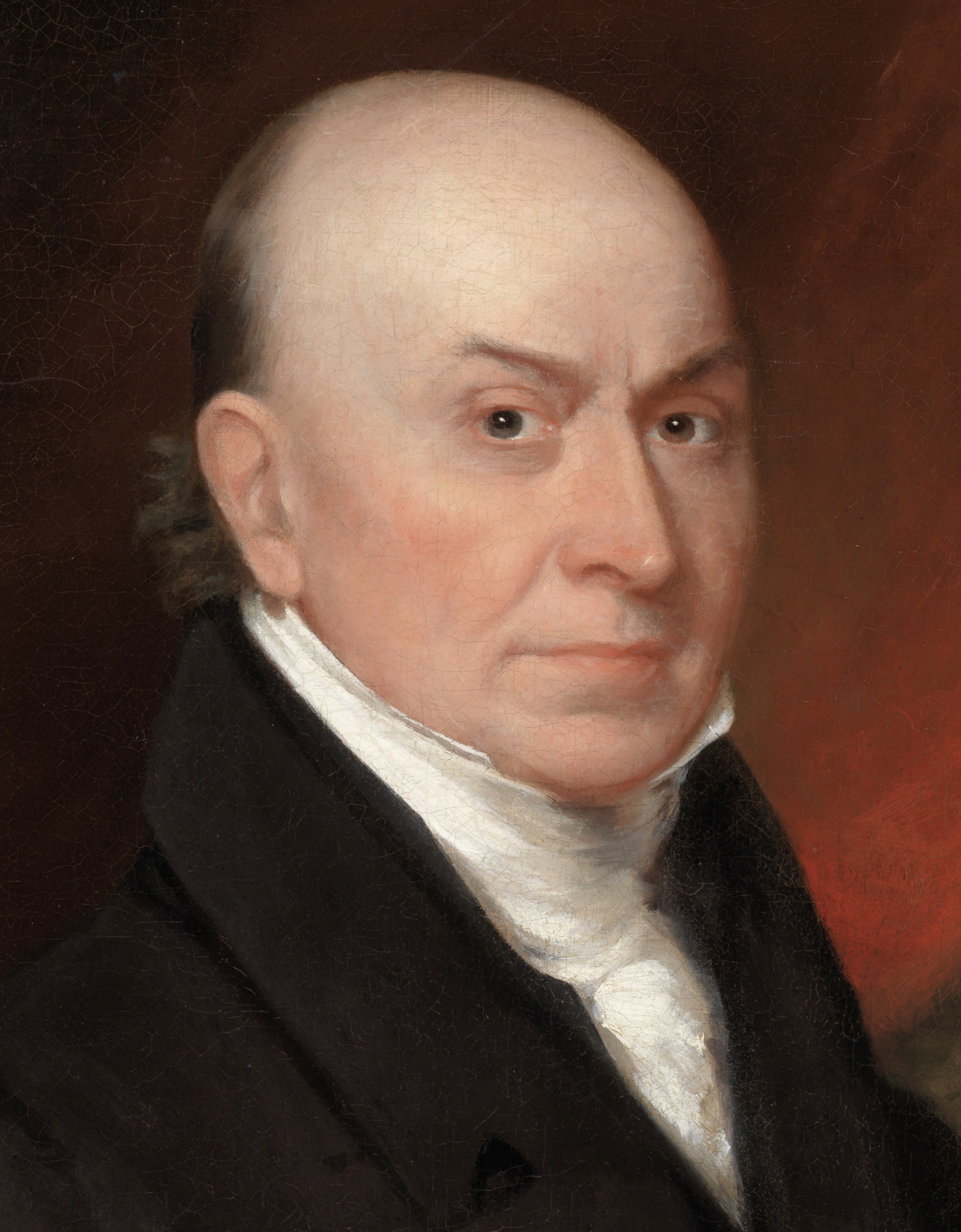
Nominee	Andrew Jackson	John Quincy Adams
Party	Democratic	National Republican
Home state	Tennessee	Massachusetts
Running mate	John C. Calhoun	Richard Rush
Electoral vote	11	0
Popular vote	44,293	2,240
Percentage	95.19%	4.81%
County results
Jackson
80–90%
90–100%
Unknown/No vote
President before election
John Quincy Adams
National Republican
Elected President
Andrew Jackson
Democratic

The 1828 United States presidential election in Tennessee took place between October 31 and December 2, 1828, as part of the 1828 United States presidential election. Voters chose 11 representatives, or electors to the Electoral College, who voted for President and Vice President.

Tennessee voted for the Democratic candidate, Andrew Jackson, over the National Republican candidate, John Quincy Adams. Jackson won Tennessee, his home state, by a wide margin of 90.38%. This is the last time any party swept every Tennessee county and the best ever performance for a Democrat in a Presidential election in Tennessee.

== Results ==
1828 United States presidential election in Tennessee
Party	Candidate	Votes	Percentage	Electoral votes
Democratic	Andrew Jackson	44,293	95.19%	11
National Republican	John Quincy Adams (incumbent)	2,240	4.81%	0
Totals		46,533	100.00%	11

== See also ==
- United States presidential elections in Tennessee
- 1827 Tennessee gubernatorial election
