= 1828 United States presidential election in Vermont =

- October 31 – December 2, 1828
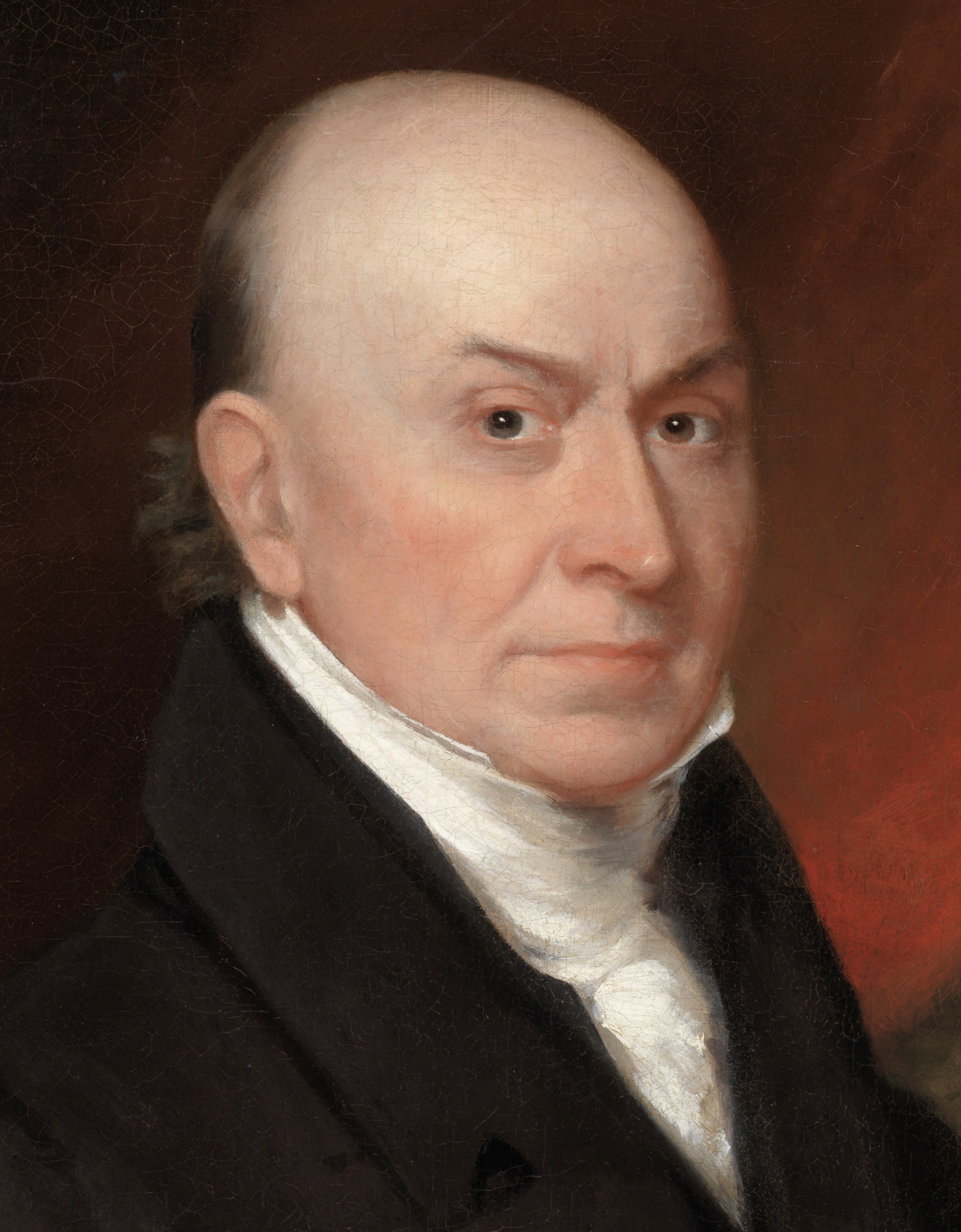

Nominee	John Quincy Adams	Andrew Jackson
Party	National Republican	Democratic
Home state	Massachusetts	Tennessee
Running mate	Richard Rush	John C. Calhoun
Electoral vote	7	0
Popular vote	25,363	8,350
Percentage	75.23%	24.77%
County results
Adams
50–60%
60–70%
70–80%
80–90%

The 1828 United States presidential election in Vermont took place between October 31 and December 2, 1828, as part of the 1828 United States presidential election. Voters chose seven representatives, or electors to the Electoral College, who voted for President and Vice President.

Vermont voted for the National Republican candidate, John Quincy Adams, over the Democratic candidate, Andrew Jackson. Adams won Vermont by a margin of 50.46%.

With 75.23% of the popular vote, Adam's victory in Vermont was his third strongest state in the 1828 election after Rhode Island and Massachusetts. No Democrat was to win Vermont until Lyndon B. Johnson did so in 1964. This election marks the first time Vermont chose its electors by popular vote rather than appointment by the state legislature.

== Results ==
1828 United States presidential election in Vermont
Party	Candidate	Votes	Percentage	Electoral votes
National Republican	John Quincy Adams (incumbent)	25,363	75.23%	7
Democratic	Andrew Jackson	8,350	24.77%	0
Totals		33,713	100.0%	7

== See also ==
- United States presidential elections in Vermont
