= 1828 United States presidential election in Maryland =

- October 31 – December 2, 1828
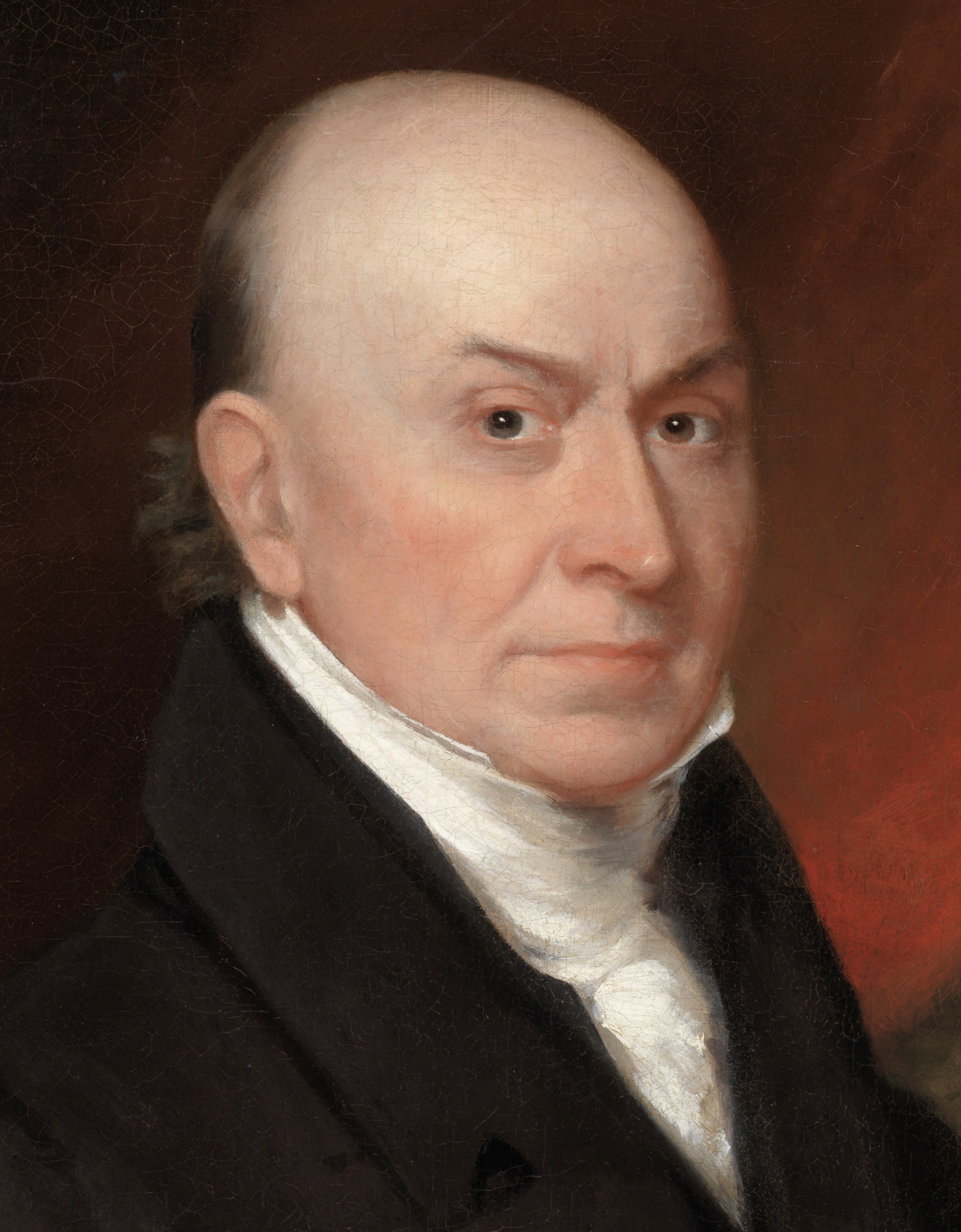

Nominee	John Quincy Adams	Andrew Jackson
Party	National Republican	Democratic
Home state	Massachusetts	Tennessee
Running mate	Richard Rush	John C. Calhoun
Electoral vote	6	5
Popular vote	23,014	22,782
Percentage	50.25%	49.75%
County results
Adams
50–60%
60–70%
70–80%
Jackson
50–60%
President before election
John Quincy Adams
National Republican
Elected President
Andrew Jackson
Democratic

The 1828 United States presidential election in Maryland took place between October 31 and December 2, 1828, as part of the 1828 United States presidential election. Voters chose 11 representatives, or electors to the Electoral College, who voted for President and Vice President.

Maryland voted for the National Republican candidate, John Quincy Adams, over the Democratic candidate, Andrew Jackson. Adams won Maryland by a margin of 0.5%. Also, this was the first time that the winner of the state's popular vote did not vote for the winning Presidential candidate.

== Results ==
1828 United States presidential election in Maryland
Party	Candidate	Votes	Percentage	Electoral votes
National Republican	John Quincy Adams (incumbent)	25,530	50.96%	6
Democratic	Andrew Jackson	24,565	49.03%	5
Totals		45,796	100.0%	11

=== Results by county ===
County	John Quincy Adams National Republican		Andrew Jackson Democratic		Margin		Total votes cast
County	#	%	#	%	#	%	Total votes cast
Allegany	741	46.40%	856	53.60%	-115	-7.20%	1,597
Anne Arundel	1,431	52.83%	1,275	47.17%	156	5.66%	2,706
Baltimore (City and County)	5,917	43.38%	7,725	56.62%	-1,808	-13.24%	13,642
Calvert	537	74.79%	181	25.21%	356	49.58%	718
Caroline	666	55.36%	537	44.64%	129	10.72%	1,203
Cecil	1,041	48.22%	1,118	51.78%	-77	-3.56%	2,159
Charles	739	57.15%	551	42.85%	188	14.30%	1,290
Dorchester	1,067	57.03%	804	42.97%	263	14.06%	1,871
Frederick	3,633	52.91%	3,234	47.09%	399	5.82%	6,867
Harford	1,201	52.31%	1,095	47.69%	106	4.62%	2,296
Kent	540	53.95%	461	46.05%	79	7.90%	1,001
Montgomery	1,036	61.78%	641	38.22%	395	23.56%	1,677
Prince George's	735	51.69%	687	48.31%	48	3.38%	1,422
Queen Anne's	668	50.26%	661	49.74%	7	-0.52%	1,329
St. Mary's	761	67.35%	369	32.65%	392	34.70%	1,130
Somerset	1,265	62.47%	760	37.53%	505	24.94%	2,025
Talbot	818	66.02%	421	33.98%	397	32.04%	1,239
Washington	1,743	45.51%	2,087	54.49%	-344	-8.98%	3,830
Worcester	991	47.35%	1,102	52.65%	-111	-5.30%	2,093
Total	25,530	50.96%	24,565	49.04%	965	1.92%	50,095

==== Counties that flipped from Democratic-Republican to Democratic ====
- Alleghany
- Baltimore
- Cecil
- Washington
- Worcester

==== Counties that flipped from Democratic-Republican to National Republican ====
- Anne Arundel
- Calvert
- Caroline
- Charles
- Dorchester
- Frederick
- Harford
- Kent
- Montgomery
- Prince George's
- St. Mary's
- Somerset
- Talbot

== See also ==
- United States presidential elections in Maryland
- 1828 United States presidential election
- 1828 United States elections
