= 1828 United States presidential election =

Election of Andrew Jackson

- October 31 – December 2, 1828

261 members of the Electoral College 131 electoral votes needed to win
- Turnout: 57.3% (▲30.4 pp)

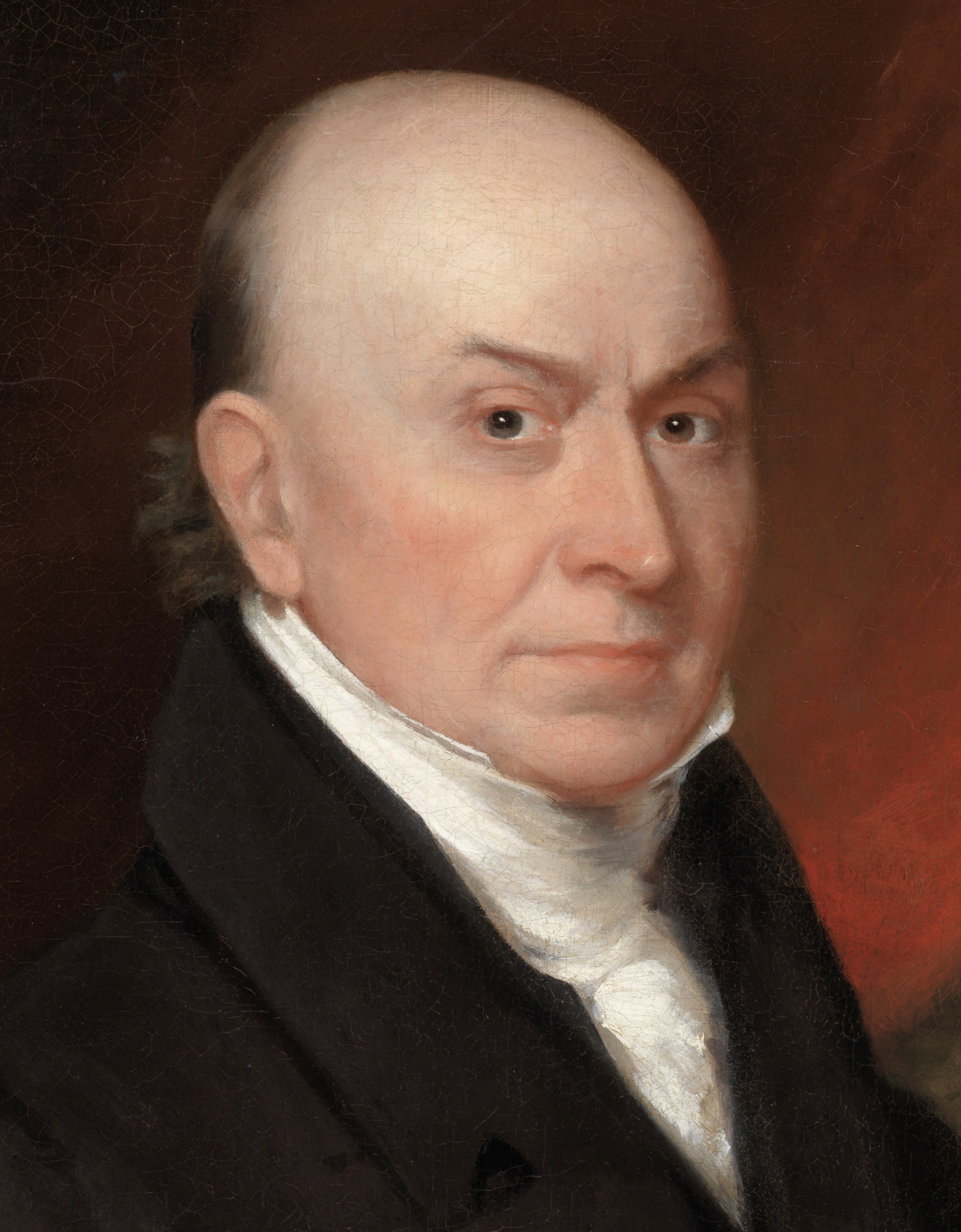
| Nominee | Andrew Jackson | John Quincy Adams |
| Party | Democratic | National Republican |
| Alliance | | Anti-Masonic |
| Home state | Tennessee | Massachusetts |
| Running mate | John C. Calhoun | Richard Rush |
| Electoral vote | 178 | 83 |
| States carried | 15 | 9 |
| Popular vote | 638,348 | 507,440 |
| Percentage | 55.3% | 44.0% |
- Presidential election results map. Blue denotes states won by Jackson and Calhoun or Smith, Beige denotes those won by Adams/Rush. Numbers indicate the number of electoral votes allotted to each state.
President before election
John Quincy Adams
National Republican
Elected President
Andrew Jackson
Democratic

A presidential election was held in the United States from October 31 to December 2, 1828. Just as in the 1824 election, President John Quincy Adams of the National Republican Party faced Andrew Jackson of the Democratic Party, making the election the second rematch in presidential history. Both parties were new organizations, and this was the first presidential election their nominees contested.

With the collapse of the Federalist Party, four members of the Democratic-Republican Party, including Jackson and Adams, had sought the presidency in the 1824 election. Jackson had won a plurality (but not majority) of both the electoral vote and popular vote in the 1824 election, but had lost the contingent election that was held in the House of Representatives. In the aftermath of the election, Jackson's supporters accused Adams and Henry Clay of having reached a "corrupt bargain" in which Clay helped Adams win the contingent election in return for the position of Secretary of State. After the 1824 election, Jackson's supporters immediately began plans for a campaign in 1828, and the Democratic-Republican Party fractured into the National Republican Party and the Democratic Party during Adams's presidency.

The 1828 campaign was marked by large amounts of "mudslinging", as both parties attacked the personal qualities of the opposing party's candidate. Jackson dominated in the South and the West, aided in part by the passage of the Tariff of 1828. With the ongoing expansion of the right to vote to most white men, the election marked a dramatic expansion of the electorate, with 9.5% of Americans casting a vote for president, compared with 3.4% in 1824. Several states transitioned to a popular vote for president, leaving South Carolina and Delaware as the only states in which the legislature chose presidential electors.

Jackson decisively won the election, carrying 55.5% of the popular vote and 178 electoral votes, to Adams' 83. The election marked the rise of Jacksonian Democracy and the transition from the First Party System to the Second Party System. Historians debate the significance of the election, with many arguing that it marked the beginning of modern American politics by removing key barriers to voter participation and establishing a stable two-party system. Jackson became the first president whose home state was neither Massachusetts nor Virginia, while Adams was the second to lose re-election, following his father John Adams.

== Nominations ==
=== Jacksonian Party ===
1828 Jacksonian Party ticket
| Andrew Jackson | John C. Calhoun |
| for President | for Vice President |
| U.S. Senator from Tennessee (1797–1798 & 1823–1825) | 7th Vice President of the United States (1825–1832) |
Campaign

In October 1825, the Tennessee legislature re-nominated Jackson for president. Congressional opponents of Adams, including former William H. Crawford supporter Martin Van Buren, rallied around Jackson's candidacy. Jackson's supporters called themselves Democrats, and would formally organize as the Democratic Party shortly after his election. In hopes of uniting those opposed to Adams, Jackson ran on a ticket with Calhoun. No congressional nominating caucus or national convention was held.

Adams' relationship with Vice President John C. Calhoun deteriorated, with Calhoun opposing Clay's appointment as Secretary of State due to his own presidential ambitions. In June 1826, Calhoun gave his support to Jackson for the 1828 election. Calhoun's stance on the removal of Native Americans was not accepted by the Georgian electors who instead voted for William Smith.

Van Buren, who supported Crawford during the 1824 election, supported Jackson during the 1828 election and aided in the selection of Calhoun as vice president in order to prevent DeWitt Clinton, his political enemy, from being selected. Clinton died on February 11, 1828. Van Buren arranged for incidents to divide Calhoun and Adams such as him abstaining from a vote on tariff legislation supported by Adams in order for Calhoun to break the tie by voting against it.

Thomas Ritchie, editor of the Richmond Examiner, was one of the leading supporters of Crawford during the 1824 election and Van Buren convinced him to support Jackson. Van Buren convinced him of an alliance "between the planters of the South and the plain Republicans of the North".

=== National Republican Party ===
1828 National Republican Party ticket
| John Quincy Adams | Richard Rush |
| for President | for Vice President |
| 6th President of the United States (1825–1829) | 8th U.S. Secretary of the Treasury (1825–1829) |

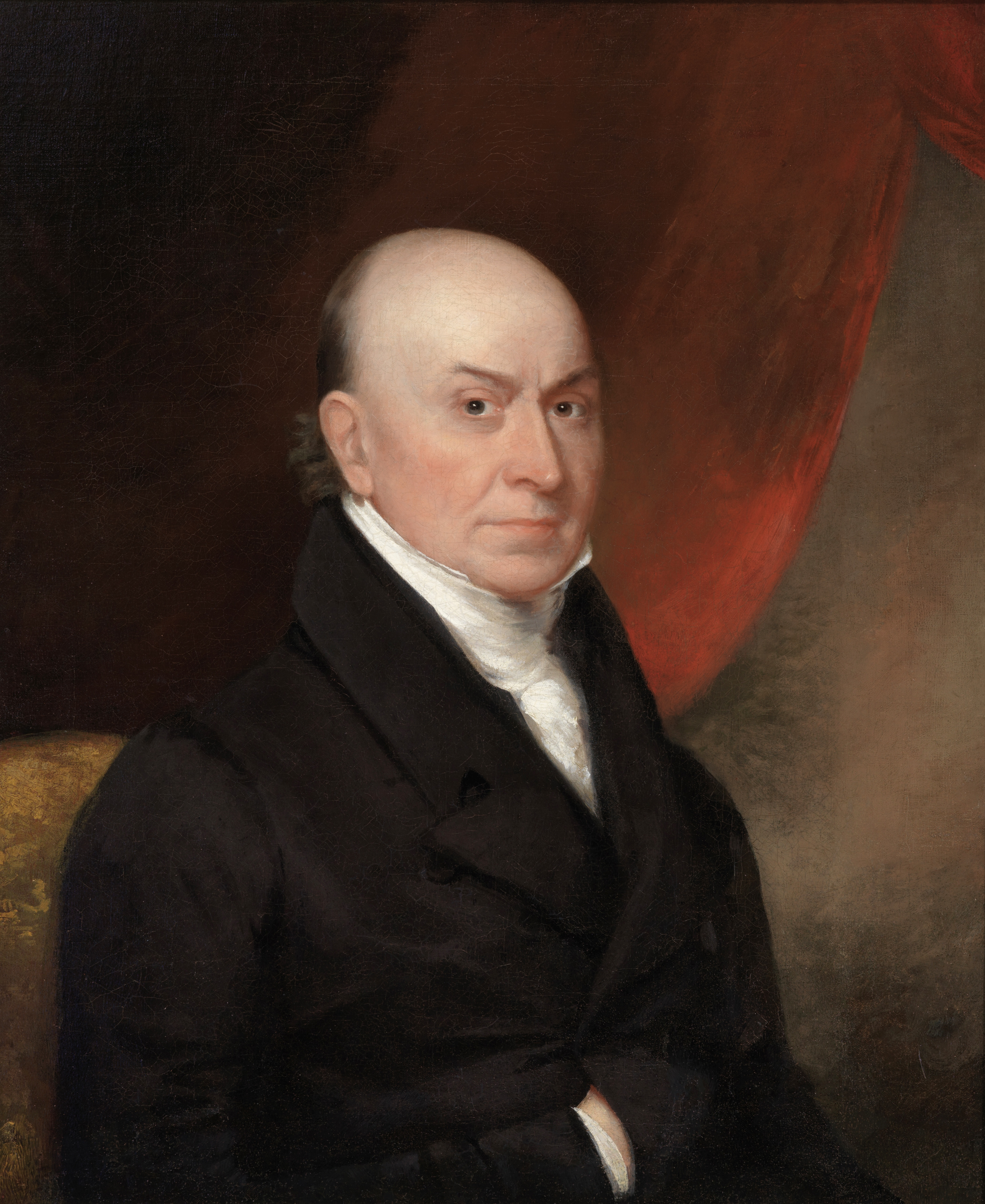
John Quincy Adams, the incumbent president in 1828, whose term expired on March 4, 1829

President Adams and his allies, including Secretary of State Clay and Senator Daniel Webster of Massachusetts, became known as the National Republicans or "Adams Party." The National Republicans were significantly less organized than the Democrats, and many party leaders did not embrace the new era of popular campaigning. Adams was re-nominated on the endorsement of state legislatures and partisan rallies. As with the Democrats, no nominating caucus or national convention was held. Adams chose Secretary of the Treasury Richard Rush, a Pennsylvanian known for his protectionist views, as his running mate. Adams, who was personally popular in New England, hoped to assemble a coalition in which Clay attracted Western voters, Rush attracted voters in the middle states, and Webster won over former members of the Federalist Party.

=== Anti-Masonic Party ===
The Anti-Masonic Party was organized in Upstate New York in 1827, in response to the disappearance of William Morgan. Senior figures in the Adams Party were sympathetic to Anti-Masonry, including Thurlow Weed, Adams's unofficial New York campaign manager. The New York Anti-Masonic Party "took little part in the presidential election," but many individual Anti-Masons supported Adams.

== General election ==
One memoir of 19th-century life in Illinois gives a sense of importance of the 1828 in American life:

It was probably the most exciting election, and probably more bitter feeling indulged in, than at any election that has ever taken place in this country. For several months before the election almost every occupation was dropped and the men occupied their time electioneering. Almost every day long lines of men could be seen marching after the fife and drum and led by some officer that had served in the war of 1812. The Jackson party would erect their hickory poles and the Adams party their tall maple poles, and stands would be erected under their respective poles, and the best speakers in the country would be brought out, and each party would have a barbecue of a roast ox or half-a-dozen sheep about every week.

=== Campaign ===
One of the Coffin Handbills: "Some account of the bloody deeds of General Andrew Jackson" (1828)

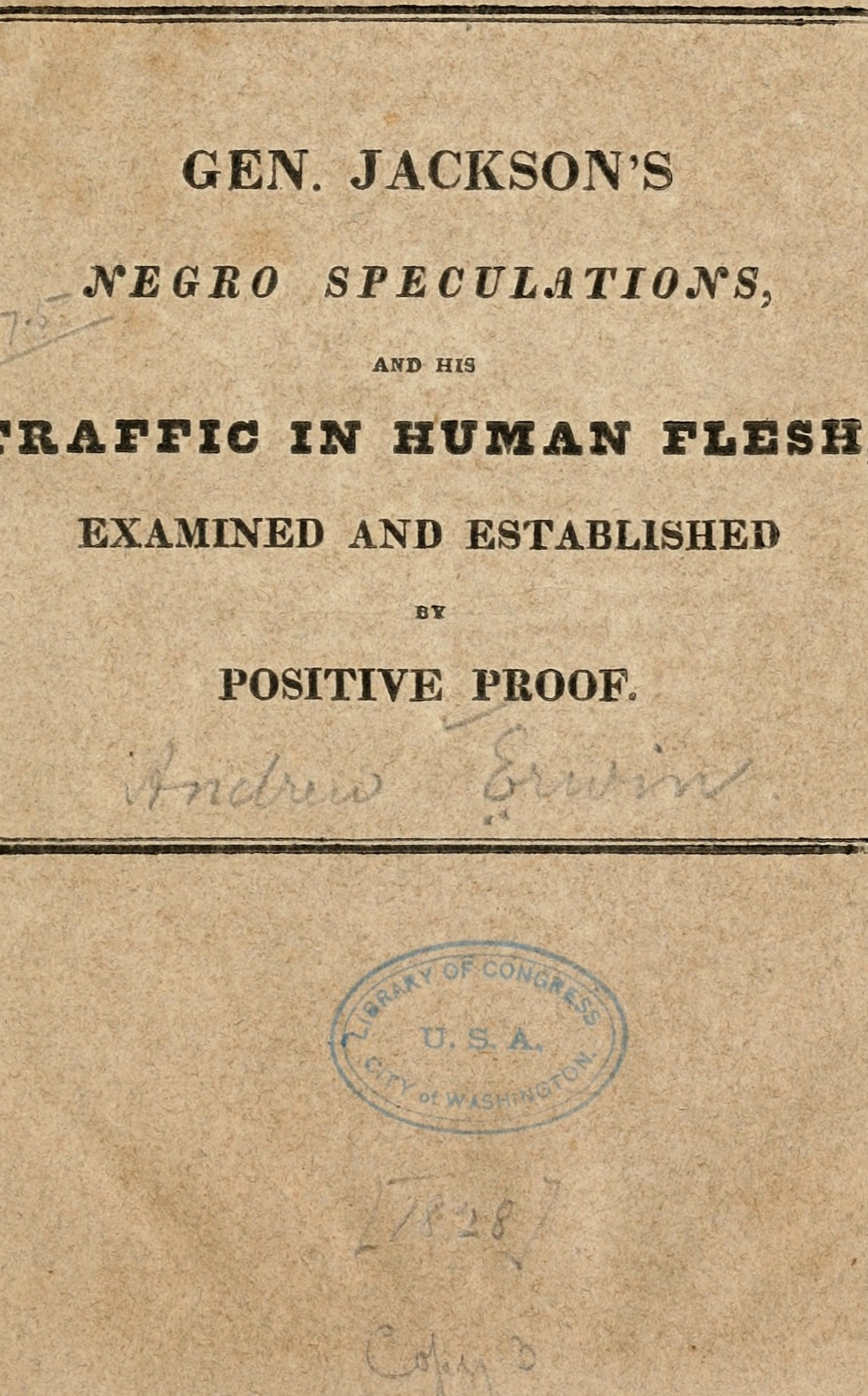
"Gen. Jackson's negro speculations and his traffic in human flesh, examined and established with positive proof" (1828) surfaced the issue of Andrew Jackson and the slave trade in the United States

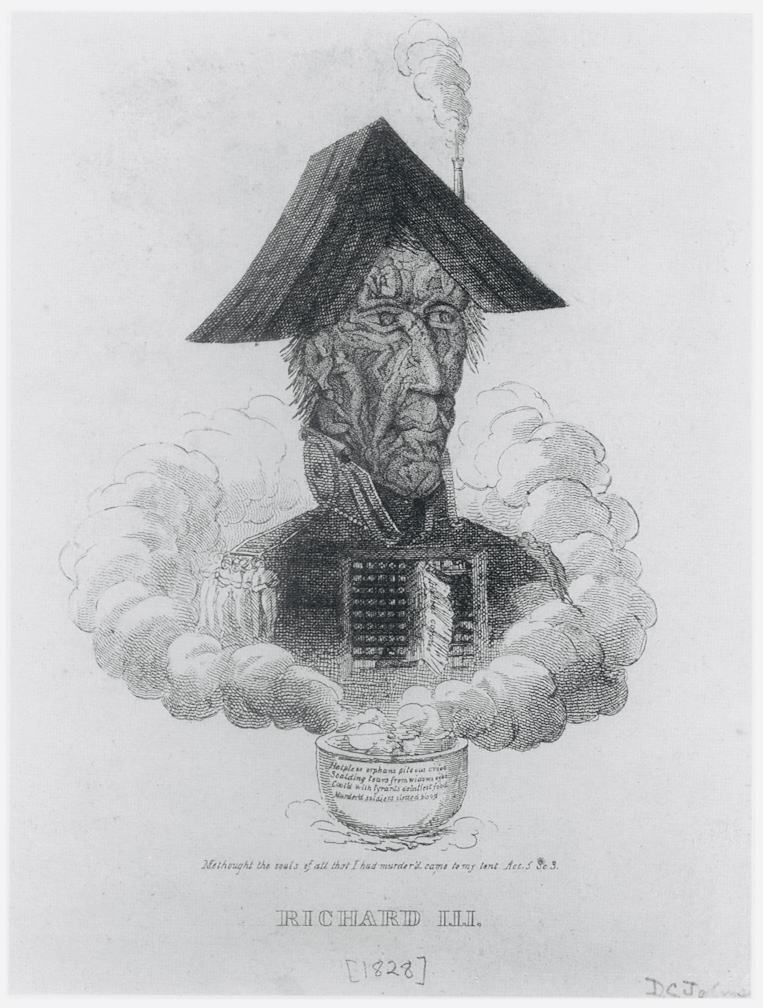
Caricature of Jackson entitled Richard III by David Claypoole Johnston (1828); according to American Art Journal, the details of his face are "composed of naked bodies of Indians. A quotation from Shakespeare's text reads, 'Me thought the souls of all that I had murder'd came to my tent.'"

The campaign was marked by large amounts of nasty "mudslinging." Jackson's marriage, for example, came in for the vicious attack. Charles Hammond, in his Cincinnati Gazette, asked: "Ought a convicted adulteress and her paramour husband be placed in the highest offices of this free and Christian land?" At the time of the election, Mr. and Mrs. Jackson had been happily, legally married for almost 35 years, but when they met, Rachel had been legally married to Lewis Robards. In the Adams campaign managers' hands, this became a scandal. The Robards–Donelson–Jackson relationship controversy has been ongoing for the better part of 200 years, but since the 1970s, historians generally agree that Andrew and Rachel ran off together to force a divorce from Lewis Robards that would have otherwise been inaccessible to Rachel and that they were a couple for roughly five years before they were legally married in 1794. Decades later, their youthful love story became a political liability. Jackson's campaign did major spin control and manufactured a false timeline, convinced friends in Natchez to vouch for the retcon, and offered a semi-plausible "they were confused about divorce law" excuse to paper over the irregular marriage.Jackson biographers and Democratic partisans carried the false narrative forward well into the late 20th century.

Jackson was also charged with being an "adulterer, a gambler, a cockfighter, a bigamist, a Negro trader, drunkard, a murderer, a thief and a liar." He was a gambler, a lifelong cocker, and a slave trader. His marriage to Rachel Donelson Robards took place before her divorce from her first husband had been finalized, making the marriage bigamous. Jackson believed that attacks on him were personal vendettas consequent to past disputes, writing, "I am branded with every crime, and Doctor McNary, Col. Erwin, Anderson and Williams are associated for this purpose." One thing that all these men had in common is that they had all known and/or been business partners and/or been military comrades of Jackson going back decades. McNairy's brother gave Jackson his first law job in Nashville in 1789, Erwin and Jackson had been long-time land speculation partners until a massive deal went bad, Anderson had been Jackson's aide-de-camp at the time of the Burr conspiracy and had succeeded him as district attorney for Tennessee, and Williams had sold slaves to Jackson and had been honored by the general for his gallant leadership as a militia commander during the 1813–14 campaign against the Red Stick Creeks.

Many of the claims about Jackson were accurate or had some basis in fact, but the claim published by Charles Hammond that Jackson's mother had been a prostitute imported by British soldiers during the American Revolutionary War, and that Jackson's father was "a mulatto man," was an obvious slander.

Jackson's campaigners fired back by claiming that while serving as minister to Russia, Adams had procured a young girl to serve as a prostitute for Emperor Alexander I. They also stated that Adams had a billiard table in the White House and that he had charged the government for it. (In fact Adams while minister to Russia had employed a young girl as a maid to his wife; the girl had written a letter which had been intercepted by the Russian postal services. Alexander I had been curious to meet the letter writer publicly at court and Adams had done so. The billiard table was Adams' personal property; a bill for repairing it had been accidentally included in the White House expense accounts. Adams also came under attack for having a chess set). In the words of Mark R. Cheathem, historian and editor of the presidential papers of Martin Van Buren, "Jackson's campaign accused the incumbent, John Quincy Adams, of being a pimp and spending the people's money to fund gambling in the White House. Adams was many things—stiff, dour, pious, the son of a president, an accomplished diplomat—but a betting whoremonger he was not."

Jackson also came under heavy attack as a slave trader who bought and sold slaves and moved them about in defiance of modern standards of morality (he was not attacked for merely owning slaves used in plantation work). The Coffin Handbills attacked Jackson for his courts-martial, execution of deserters, and massacres of Indian villages, and also his habit of dueling and that he supposedly fought over 100 duels. In fact, Jackson had only fought three duels: in the first both men had fired at each other but made up; in the second duel, Jackson vs John Sevier, it had taken place but only two persons not connected with either party had been slightly injured. The third duel was with Charles Dickinson in which Dickinson was mortally wounded while Jackson was left with a bullet in his chest. A so-called fourth duel between Jackson and Thomas Hart Benton was in fact a frontier brawl which left Jackson badly wounded in the shoulder. That said the list of violent incidents involving Andrew Jackson began with his arrival in Tennessee in the 1780s and continued apace for years. As historian J. M. Opal put it, "[Jackson's] willingness to kill, assault, or threaten people was a constant theme in his adult life and a central component of the reputation he cultivated."

Ezra Stiles Ely attacked Adams' Unitarian beliefs and called for Christians to vote for Jackson.

Jackson avoided articulating issue positions, instead campaigning on his personal qualities and his opposition to Adams. Adams avoided popular campaigning, instead emphasizing his support of specific issues. Adams's praise of internal improvements in Europe, such as "lighthouses of the skies" (observatories), in his first annual message to Congress, and his suggestion that Congress not be "palsied by the will of our constituents" were given attention in and out of the press. John Randolph stated on the floor of the Senate that he "never will be palsied by any power save the constitution, and the will of my constituents." Jackson wrote that a lavish government combined with contempt of the constituents could lead to despotism, if not checked by the "voice of the people." Modern campaigning was also introduced by Jackson. People kissed babies, had picnics, and started many other traditions during the campaign.

==== Jefferson's opinion ====
Hunters of Kentucky
Jackson supporters used this Battle of New Orleans anthem as their campaign song.

Thomas Jefferson wrote favorably in response to Jackson in December 1823 and extended an invitation to his estate of Monticello: "I recall with pleasure the remembrance of our joint labors while in the Senate together in times of great trial and of hard battling, battles indeed of words, not of blood, as those you have since fought so much for your own glory & that of your country; with the assurance that my attempts continue undiminished, accept that of my great respect & consideration."

Jefferson wrote of the outcome of the contingent election of 1825 in a letter to William H. Crawford, who had been the nominee of the congressional caucus of Democratic-Republicans, saying that he had hoped to congratulate Crawford on his election to the presidency but "events had not been what we had wished."

In the next election, Jackson's and Adams's supporters saw value in establishing the opinion of Jefferson in regards to their respective candidates and against their opposition. Jefferson died on July 4, 1826, on the same day as his predecessor, John Adams, Adams's father.

A goal of the pro-Adams was to depict Jackson as a "mere military chieftain." Edward Coles recounted that Jefferson told him in a conversation in August 1825 that he feared the popular enthusiasm for Jackson: "It has caused me to doubt more than anything that has occurred since our Revolution." Coles used the opinion of Thomas Gilmer to back himself up; Gilmer said Jefferson told him at Monticello before the election of Adams in 1825, "One might as well make a sailor of a cock, or a soldier of a goose, as a President of Andrew Jackson." Daniel Webster, who was also at Monticello at the time, made the same report. Webster recorded that Jefferson told him in December 1824 that Jackson was a dangerous man unfit for the presidency. Historian Sean Wilentz described Webster's account of the meeting as "not wholly reliable." Biographer Robert V. Remini said that Jefferson "had no great love for Jackson."

Gilmer accused Coles of misrepresentation, in Jefferson's opinion had changed, Gilmer said. Jefferson's son-in-law, former Virginia Governor Thomas Mann Randolph Jr., said in 1826 that Jefferson had a "strong repugnance" to Henry Clay. Randolph publicly stated that Jefferson became friendly to Jackson's candidacy as early as the summer of 1825, perhaps because of the "corrupt bargain" charge, and thought of Jackson as "an honest, sincere, clear-headed and strong-minded man; of the soundest political principles" and "the only hope left" to reverse the increasing powers assumed by the federal government. Others said the same thing, but Coles could not believe Jefferson's opinion had changed.

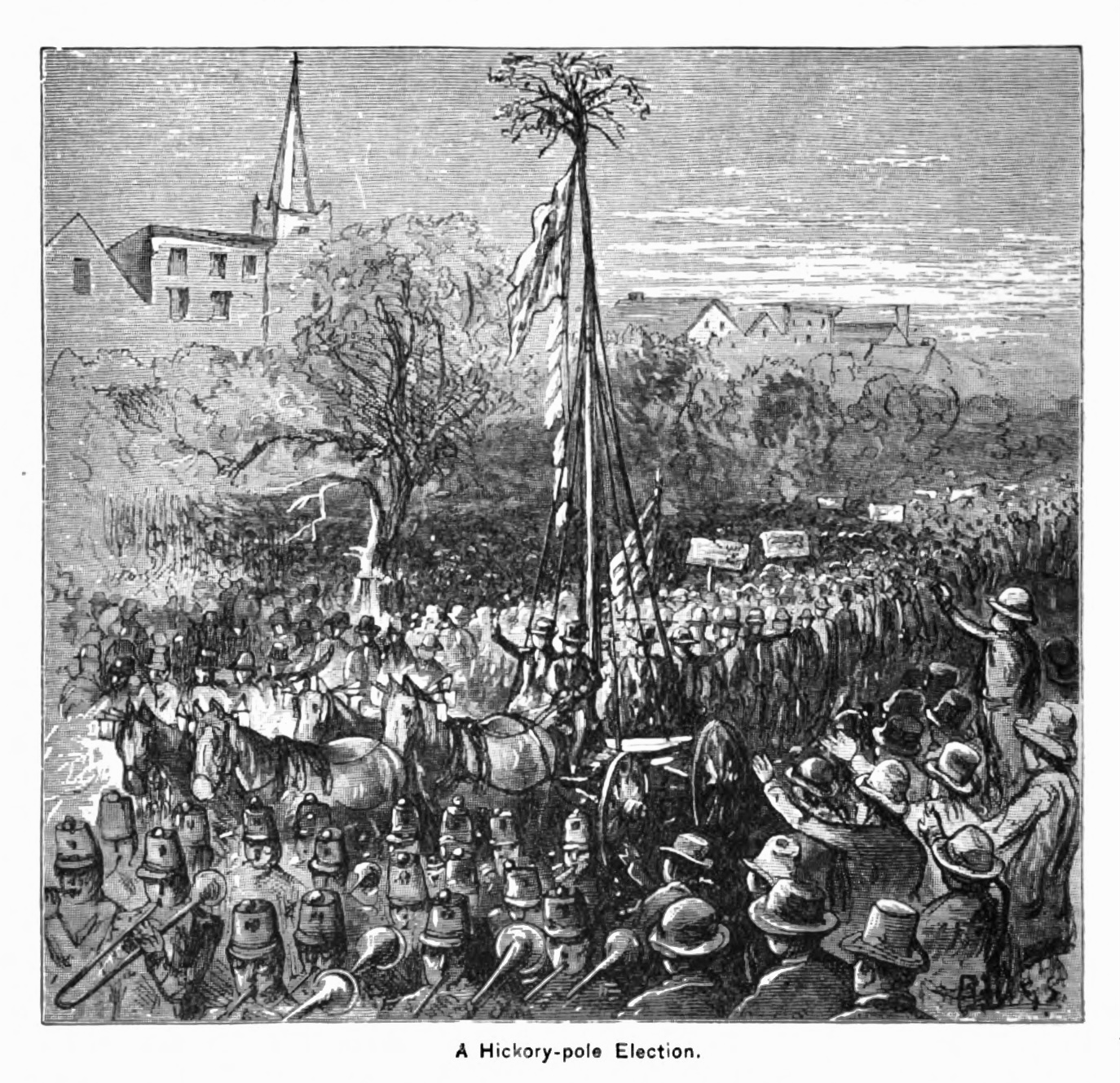
Jackson supporters put up hickory poles

In 1827, Virginia Governor William B. Giles released a letter from Jefferson meant to be kept private to Thomas Ritchie's Richmond Enquirer. It was written after Adams's first annual message to Congress and it contained an attack from Jefferson on the incumbent administration. Giles said Jefferson's alarm was with the usurpation of the rights of the states, not with a "military chieftain." Jefferson wrote, "take together the decisions of the federal court, the doctrines of the President, and the misconstructions of the constitutional compact acted on by the legislature of the federal bench, and it is but too evident, that the three ruling branches of that department are in combination to strip their colleagues, the State authorities, of the powers reserved by them, and to exercise themselves all functions foreign and domestic." Of the Federalists, he continued, "But this opens with a vast accession of strength from their younger recruits, who, having nothing in them of the feelings or principles of '76, now look to a single and splendid government of an aristocracy, founded on banking institutions, and moneyed incorporations under the guise and cloak of their favored branches of manufactures, commerce, and navigation, riding and ruling over the plundered plowman and beggared yeomanry." The Jacksonians and states' rights men heralded its publication; the Adams men felt it a symptom of senility. Giles omitted a prior letter of Jefferson's praise of Adams for his role in the embargo of 1808. Thomas Jefferson Randolph soon collected and published Jefferson's correspondence.

=== Media ===
Newspapers supporting Jackson included the United States Telegraph, the St. Louis Enquirer, Albany Argus, Richmond Enquirer, New Hampshire Patriot, New York Enquirer, and the Rochester Daily Advertiser.

Newspapers supporting Adams included the Washington's National Journal, the Democratic Press of Philadelphia, the Kentucky Reporter, and the Cincinnati Gazette.

=== Results ===
22.2% of the voting age population and 57.3% of eligible voters participated in the election. All of the states, except for Delaware and South Carolina, selected their electors through a popular vote. The selection of electors began on October 31 with elections in Ohio and Pennsylvania and ended on November 13 with elections in North Carolina. The Electoral College met on December 3.

Adams won the same states that his father had won in the election of 1800 (the New England states, New Jersey, and Delaware) and Maryland, but Jackson won all other states and won the election in a landslide.

The Democratic Party in Georgia was hopelessly divided into two factions (Troup and Clark) at the time. Despite this, both factions nominated Jackson for President, with the election being primarily a test of the strength of these two factions - the Adams electors ran a very poor third, with just 3.21% of the vote. The winning slate received a 3,000 vote majority.

Jackson received 50.3% of the vote in states without slavery while he received 72.6% of the vote in states with slavery. He received 200,000 votes in the South and 400,000 votes in the North, but the Three-fifths Compromise, which inflated the South's electoral votes, resulted in him receiving 105 electoral votes from the South and 73 votes from the North.

This was the first election in American history in which the incumbent president lost re-election despite winning a greater share of the popular vote than in the previous election. This would not happen again until 2020. Adams' loss was also the second time an elected president lost the popular vote twice, this also occurred with Benjamin Harrison in 1888 and 1892, and Donald Trump who lost the popular vote in 2016 and 2020.

This was the last election in which the Democrats won Kentucky until 1856. It is also the only election where Maine, New Hampshire, New Jersey, and Vermont voted for the National Republicans, and the last time that New Hampshire voted against the Democrats until 1856.

It was also the only election in which an electoral vote split occurred in Maine until the election of 2016, the first election in which the winning ticket did not have a north–south balance, and the first election in which two northerners ran against two southerners.

Electoral results
| Presidential candidate | Party | Home state | Popular vote^{(a)} | | Electoral vote | Running mate | | |
| Presidential candidate | Party | Home state | Count | Percentage | Electoral vote | Vice-presidential candidate | Home state | Electoral vote |
|---|---|---|---|---|---|---|---|---|
| Andrew Jackson | Democratic | Tennessee | 638,348 | 55.33% | 178 | John Caldwell Calhoun (incumbent) | South Carolina | 171 |
| Andrew Jackson | Democratic | Tennessee | 638,348 | 55.33% | 178 | William Smith | South Carolina | 7 |
| John Quincy Adams (incumbent) | National Republican | Massachusetts | 507,440 | 43.98% | 83 | Richard Rush | Pennsylvania | 83 |
| Andrew Jackson | Democratic (Clark) | Tennessee | 7,991^{(b)} | 0.69%^{(b)} | 0 | John C. Calhoun (incumbent) | South Carolina | 0 |
| Total | | | 1,153,779 | 100% | 261 | | | 261 |
| Needed to win | | | | | 131 | | | 131 |

Source (Popular Vote): Dubin, Michael J. United States Presidential Elections, 1788–1860 Source (Electoral Vote): "Electoral College Box Scores 1789–1996". National Archives and Records Administration.

^{(a)} The popular vote figures exclude Delaware and South Carolina: both states' electors were chosen by the state legislatures rather than by a popular vote.

^{(b)} Votes cast for Jackson electors nominated by the Clark faction of the Democratic Party of Georgia. Two tickets pledged to Jackson ran in this state; the Clark ticket was defeated by electors nominated by the Troup faction. Many sources combine the votes for both factions when reporting the Georgia results, but this is legally incorrect.

=== Maps ===
Electoral College map (president)

Electoral College map (vice president)

Map of presidential election results by county, shaded according to the vote share of the highest result for an elector of any given candidate

Map of presidential election results by electoral district, shaded according to the vote share of the highest result for an elector of any given candidate. Electoral boundaries for most of Tennessee, Maine, and Maryland could not be found

== Results by state ==
Legend
States/districts won by Jackson/Calhoun
States/districts won by Adams/Rush
| † | At-large results (For states that split electoral votes) |

| | | Andrew Jackson Democratic | | | John Quincy Adams National Republican | | | Margin | | State Total | |
| State | electoral votes | # | % | electoral votes | # | % | electoral votes | # | % | # | |
|---|---|---|---|---|---|---|---|---|---|---|---|
| Alabama | 5 | 16,750 | 89.78 | 5 | 1,976 (Note: Stated total was 1,993) | 10.22 | - | 14,774 | 79.90 | 18,726 | AL |
| Connecticut | 8 | 4,488 (Note: Stated total was 4,448) | 24.5 | - | 13,838 | 75.5 | 8 | -9,350 | -51.02 | 18,326 | CT |
| Delaware | 3 | no popular vote | | | no popular vote | | 3 | - | - | - | DE |
| Georgia (Note: There were two Jackson tickets in Georgia representing different factions of the party. The Troup faction "won" with 9,712 votes and the Clarke faction lost with 7,991. They are combined here, though legally this is incorrect. The state rejected returns from 10 counties and 8 others submitted none. Including the rejected returns, the total votes are Jackson (Troup) 10,508, Jackson (Clarke) 8,854 and Adams, 642.) | 9 | 17,703 | 96.70 | 9 | 605 | 3.31 | - | 17,098 | 93.39 | 18,308 | GA |
| Illinois | 3 | 9,582 | 67.18 | 3 | 4,681 | 32.82 | - | 4,901 | 34.36 | 14,263 | IL |
| Indiana | 5 | 22,140 | 56.60 | 5 | 16,978 | 43.40 | - | 5,162 | 13.20 | 39,118 | IN |
| Kentucky | 14 | 39,085 | 55.41 | 14 | 31,456 | 44.59 | - | 7,629 | 10.81 | 70,541 | KY |
| Louisiana | 5 | 4,603 | 53.04 | 5 | 4,076 | 46.96 | - | 527 | 6.07 | 8,679 | LA |
| Maine† | 2 | 13,808 (Note: Stated total was 13,927) | 40.18 | - | 20,558 | 59.82 | 2 | -6,750 | -19.58 | 34,366 | ME |
| Maine-Cumberland | 1 | 4,227 | 51.11 | 1 | 4,043 | 48.89 | - | 184 | 2.22 | 8,270 | ME1 |
| Maine-York | 1 | 1,865 | 37.97 | - | 3,047 | 62.03 | 1 | -1,182 | -24.06 | 4,912 | ME2 |
| Maine-Kennebec | 1 | 1,057 | 25.58 | - | 3,075 | 74.42 | 1 | -2,018 | -48.83 | 4,132 | ME3 |
| Maine-Lincoln | 1 | 820 | 29.79 | - | 1,933 | 71.21 | 1 | -1,113 | -40.43 | 2,753 | ME4 |
| Maine-Oxford | 1 | 2,812 | 47.05 | - | 3,248 | 52.95 | 1 | -364 | -5.90 | 6,170 | ME5 |
| Maine-Hancock & Washington | 1 | 1,235 | 35.26 | - | 2,268 | 64.74 | 1 | -1,033 | -29.49 | 3,503 | ME6 |
| Maine-Somerset & Ponobscot | 1 | 1,792 | 36.99 | - | 3,052 | 63.01 | 1 | -1,260 | -26.01 | 4,844 | ME7 |
| Maryland-1 | 1 | 1,101 | 35.19 | - | 2,027 | 65.8` | 1 | -926 | -29.60 | 3,128 | MD1 |
| Maryland-2 | 1 | 1,328 | 42.85 | - | 1,771 | 57.14 | 1 | -443 | -14.29 | 3,099 | MD2 |
| Maryland-3 (Note: In Maryland's 3rd and 4th districts, voters voted for two electors, with each pledged to one candidate or another. The votes in the 3rd were 6,177 for William Fitzhugh Jr. and 6,164 for William Tyler, both for Jackson, versus 6,117 for George Baltzell and William Price for Adams. In the 4th the votes were 6,058 for Benjamin Chew Howard and James Sewell for Jackson versus 5,743 and 5,742 for the Adams electors. Note: Dubin mistakenly swapped the 3rd and 4th districts in his book, but that has been corrected here.) | 2 | 6,177 | 50.24 | 2 | 6,117 | 49.76 | - | 60 | 0.49 | 12,294 | MD3 |
| Maryland-4 | 2 | 6,058 | 51.33 | 2 | 5,743 | 49.66 | - | 315 | 2.67 | 11,801 | MD4 |
| Maryland-5 | 1 | 2,942 | 64.74 | 1 | 1,602 | 35.26 | - | 1,340 | 29.49 | 4,544 | MD5 |
| Maryland-6 | 1 | 2,213 | 49.68 | - | 2,242 | 50.33 | 1 | -29 | -0.65 | 4,455 | MD6 |
| Maryland-7 | 1 | 1,122 | 48.15 | - | 1,208 | 51.85 | 1 | -86 | -4.04 | 2,130 | MD7 |
| Maryland-8 | 1 | 1,050 | 40.37 | - | 1,551 | 59.63 | 1 | -501 | -19.26 | 2,601 | MD8 |
| Maryland-9 | 1 | 2,574 | 44.15 | - | 3,256 | 55.85 | 1 | -682 | -11.70 | 5,830 | MD9 |
| Massachusetts | 15 | 6,016 | 16.78 | - | 29,842 (Note: Stated total was 29,836) | 83.22 | 15 | -23,826 | -66.45 | 35,858 | MA |
| Mississippi | 3 | 7,086 (Note: Stated total was 7,088) | 81.56 | 3 | 1,602 | 18.44 | - | 5,484 | 63.12 | 8,688 | MS |
| Missouri | 3 | 8,287 | 69.30 | 3 | 3,672 | 30.70 | - | 4,615 | 38.59 | 11,959 | MO |
| New Hampshire | 8 | 21,182 | 46.76 | - | 24,120 | 53.24 | 8 | -2.938 | -6.48 | 45,302 | NH |
| New Jersey | 8 | 21,951 | 48.02 | - | 23,764 | 51.98 | 8 | -1,813 | -4.02 | 45,715 | NJ |
| New York (Note: Two statewide electors were chosen by the electors elected at the district level.) | 2 | 139,412 | 51.45 | 2 | 131,563 | 48.55 | - | 7,849 | 2.9 | 270,975 | NY |
| New York-1 | 1 | 3,075 | 51.93 | 1 | 2,847 | 48.07 | - | 228 | 3.85 | 5,922 | NY1 |
| New York-2 | 1 | 2,936 | 59.89 | 1 | 1,966 | 40.11 | - | 970 | 19.79 | 4,902 | NY2 |
| New York-3 | 3 | 15,435 | 61.56 | 3 | 9,638 | 38.44 | - | 5,797 | 23.12 | 25,073 | NY3 |
| New York-4 | 1 | 3,788 | 54.57 | 1 | 3,153 | 45.43 | - | 635 | 9.15 | 6,941 | NY4 |
| New York-5 | 1 | 4,680 | 58.92 | 1 | 3,263 | 41.08 | - | 1,417 | 17.84 | 7,943 | NY5 |
| New York-6 | 1 | 3,798 | 59.49 | 1 | 2,586 | 40.51 | - | 1,212 | 18.98 | 6,384 | NY6 |
| New York-7 | 1 | 4,624 | 69.71 | 1 | 2,009 | 30.29 | - | 1,212 | 18.27 | 6,633 | NY7 |
| New York-8 | 1 | 3,446 | 48.62 | - | 3,642 | 51.38 | 1 | -196 | -2.77 | 7,088 | NY8 |
| New York-9 | 1 | 4,263 | 47.83 | - | 4,650 | 52.17 | 1 | -387 | -4.34 | 8,913 | NY9 |
| New York-10 | 1 | 3,924 | 48.33 | - | 4,195 | 51.67 | 1 | -271 | -3.34 | 8,119 | NY10 |
| New York-11 | 1 | 5,331 | 61.27 | 1 | 3,370 | 38.73 | - | 1961 | 22.54 | 8,701 | NY11 |
| New York-12 | 1 | 3,740 | 59.14 | 1 | 2,584 | 48.86 | - | 1156 | 18.28 | 6,324 | NY12 |
| New York-13 | 1 | 4,241 | 52.09 | 1 | 3.900 | 47.91 | - | 341 | 4.19 | 8,141 | NY13 |
| New York-14 | 1 | 5,136 | 46.89 | - | 5,817 | 53.11 | 1 | -681 | -6.22 | 10.953 | NY14 |
| New York-15 | 1 | 3,177 | 55.86 | 1 | 2,510 | 44.14 | - | 667 | 11.73 | 5,687 | NY15 |
| New York-16 | 1 | 3,778 | 48.69 | - | 3,982 | 54.76 | 1 | -204 | -2.63 | 7,760 | NY16 |
| New York-17 | 1 | 2,929 | 45.25 | - | 3,545 | 45.24 | 1 | -616 | -9.51 | 6,474 | NY17 |
| New York-18 | 1 | 2,658 | 39.42 | - | 4,085 | 60.58 | 1 | -1,427 | -21.16 | 6,743 | NY18 |
| New York-19 | 1 | 4,503 | 47.18 | - | 5,042 | 52.82 | 1 | -539 | -5.65 | 5,922 | NY19 |
| New York-20 | 2 | 9,081 | 49.77 | - | 9,164 | 50.23 | 2 | -83 | -0.45 | 18,245 | NY20 |
| New York-21 | 1 | 4,329 | 58.15 | 1 | 3,116 | 41.85 | - | 1,213 | 16.29 | 7,445 | NY21 |
| New York-22 | 1 | 4,136 | 45.40 | - | 4,974 | 54.60 | 1 | -838 | -9.20 | 9,110 | NY22 |
| New York-23 | 1 | 4,264 | 52.90 | 1 | 3,796 | 47.10 | - | 468 | 5.81 | 8,060 | NY23 |
| New York-24 | 1 | 4,159 | 63.25 | 1 | 2,416 | 36.75 | - | 1,743 | 26.51 | 6,575 | NY24 |
| New York-25 | 1 | 5,427 | 59.10 | 1 | 3,755 | 40.90 | - | 1,672 | 18.21 | 9,182 | NY25 |
| New York-26 | 2 | 7,011 | 43.47 | - | 9,119 | 56.53 | 2 | -2,108 | -13.07 | 16,130 | NY26 |
| New York-27 | 1 | 4,631 | 39.55 | - | 7,079 | 60.45 | 1 | -2,448 | -20.91 | 11,701 | NY27 |
| New York-28 | 1 | 5,347 | 54.89 | 1 | 4,395 | 45.11 | - | 952 | 9.77 | 9,742 | NY28 |
| New York-29 | 1 | 3,256 | 32.28 | - | 6,832 | 67.72 | 1 | -3,576 | -34.54 | 10,088 | NY29 |
| New York-30 | 1 | 3,660 | 31.44 | - | 7,983 | 68.56 | 1 | -4,323 | -37.13 | 11,643 | NY30 |
| North Carolina | 15 | 37,634 | 72.97 | 15 | 13,938 | 27.03 | - | 23,696 | 45.95 | 51,572 | NC |
| Ohio | 16 | 67,596 | 51.58 | 16 | 63,456 | 48.42 | - | 4,140 | 3.16 | 131,052 | OH |
| Pennsylvania | 28 | 102,151 | 66.79 | 28 | 50,783 | 33.21 | - | 51,368 | 33.59 | 152,934 | PA |
| Rhode Island | 4 | 820 | 22.95 | - | 2,753 | 77.05 | 4 | -1,933 | -54.10 | 3,573 | RI |
| South Carolina | 11 | no popular vote | | 11 | no popular vote | | | - | - | - | SC |
| Tennessee-1 | 1 | 3,136 | 100.00 | 1 | 0 | 0.00 | - | 3,136 | 100.00 | 3,136 | TN1 |
| Tennessee-2 | 1 | 3,418 | 95.98 | 1 | 143 | 4.02 | - | 3,275 | 91.97 | 3,561 | TN2 |
| Tennessee-3 | 1 | 4,001 | 94.03 | 1 | 254 | 5.97 | - | 3,747 | 88.06 | 4,255 | TN3 |
| Tennessee-4 | 1 | 3,211 | 99.78 | 1 | 7 | 0.22 | - | 3,204 | 99.56 | 3,218 | TN4 |
| Tennessee-5 | 1 | 5,196 | 98.60 | 1 | 74 | 1.40 | - | 5,122 | 97.19 | 5,270 | TN5 |
| Tennessee-6 | 1 | 3,605 | 100.00 | 1 | 0 | 0.00 | - | 3,605 | 100.00 | 3,605 | TN6 |
| Tennessee-7 | 1 | 5,008 | 87.51 | 1 | 715 | 12.49 | - | 4,293 | 75.01 | 5,723 | TN7 |
| Tennessee-8 | 1 | 3,443 | 99.83 | 1 | 6 | 0.17 | - | 3,437 | 99.65 | 3,449 | TN8 |
| Tennessee-9 | 1 | 4,311 | 95.14 | 1 | 220 | 4.86 | - | 4,091 | 90.29 | 4,531 | TN9 |
| Tennessee-10 | 1 | 3,481 | 95.11 | 1 | 179 | 4.89 | - | 3,302 | 90.22 | 3,660 | TN10 |
| Tennessee-11 | 1 | 5,282 | 89.16 | 1 | 642 | 10.84 | - | 4,640 | 78.33 | 5,924 | TN11 |
| Vermont | 7 | 8,335 | 25.49 | - | 24,365 | 74.51 | 7 | -16,030 | -49.02 | 32,700 | VT |
| Virginia | 24 | 26,842 | 69.13 | 24 | 11,989 | 30.87 | - | 14,853 | 38.25 | 38,831 | VA |
| TOTALS: | 261 | 638,348 | 55.71 | 178 | 507,440 | 44.29 | 83 | 130,908 | 11.43 | 1,145,788 | US |
| TO WIN: | 131 | | | | | | | | | | |

=== States that flipped from Democratic-Republican to National Republican ===
- Connecticut
- Delaware
- Maine
- Maryland
- Massachusetts
- New Hampshire
- New Jersey
- Rhode Island
- Vermont

=== States that flipped from Democratic-Republican to Democratic ===
- Alabama
- Georgia
- Illinois
- Indiana
- Kentucky
- Louisiana
- Mississippi
- Missouri
- New York
- North Carolina
- Ohio
- Pennsylvania
- South Carolina
- Tennessee
- Virginia

=== Close states ===
Districts where the margin of victory was under 1%:

1. NY-20 0.45%
2. MD-3 0.49%
3. MD-6 0.65%

States and Districts where the margin of victory was under 5%:

1. Maine-Cumberland 2.22%
2. NY-16 2.63%
3. MD-4 2.67%
4. NY-8 2.77%
5. Ohio 3.16%
6. NY-10 3.34%
7. NY-1 3.85%
8. New Jersey 4.02%
9. MD-7 4.04%
10. NY-13 4.19%
11. NY-9 4.34%

States and Districts where the margin of victory was under 10%:

1. NY-19 5.65%
2. NY-23 5.81%
3. Maine-Oxford 5.90%
4. Louisiana 6.07%
5. NY-14 6.22%
6. New Hampshire 6.48%
7. NY-4 9.15%
8. NY-22 9.20%
9. NY-17 9.51%
10. NY-28 9.77%

Popular vote
| Jackson | 55.33% |
| Adams | 43.98% |
| Other | 0.69% |

Electoral vote—President
| Jackson | 68.20% |
| Adams | 31.80% |

Electoral vote—Vice President
| Calhoun | 65.52% |
| Rush | 31.80% |
| Smith | 2.68% |

== Aftermath ==
A voter named Thomas J. Forney, who lived in Burke County, North Carolina, wrote to a friend in Virginia on December 4, 1828:

Permit me in the next place to touch a little on the presidential question. On the day of the electoral election I was at Muddy Creek, at which place Adams received 4 votes, from John Rutherford, myself, William Alexander and — Bedford. Adams received something like 200 in this county, but it appears from undubitable authority that the "Hero" will succeed; if so, I will, I must, submit to a greater power. At the election ground of Col. Carson's, Jackson received all of the votes. Col. Carson planted a hickory pole on the ground that day, and intends to keep it alive by pouring whiskey on its roots. Gen. Jackson was first started on the electioneering campaign as a tool to answer some purpose intended by his anti-supporters, but after canvassing the business up to the present date it appears that he is the spectacle of the people. I am surprised that the Kentuckians supported him, after his saying in that stigmatizing language, that "The Kentuckians ingloriously fled." I am persuaded, Sir, that they were right and perfectly justifiable in making their escape, as they were destitute of arms of defence. The South Carolinians support Jackson with the belief that he is an anti-tariff man; the Pennsylvanians because he is a tariff man. If I could believe that he was a supporter of the tariff, I would rest contented. Finally, I presume he will be our next president. If so, we have "cut the rod to whip ourselves," and must bear with the malady. My next choice will be the able and monstrous Henry Clay. But enough of such.

Rachel Jackson had been having chest pains throughout the campaign, and she was traumatized by the personal attacks on her marriage. She became ill and died on December 22, 1828. Jackson accused the Adams campaign, and Henry Clay even more so, of causing her death, saying, "I can and do forgive all my enemies. But those vile wretches who have slandered her must look to God for mercy."

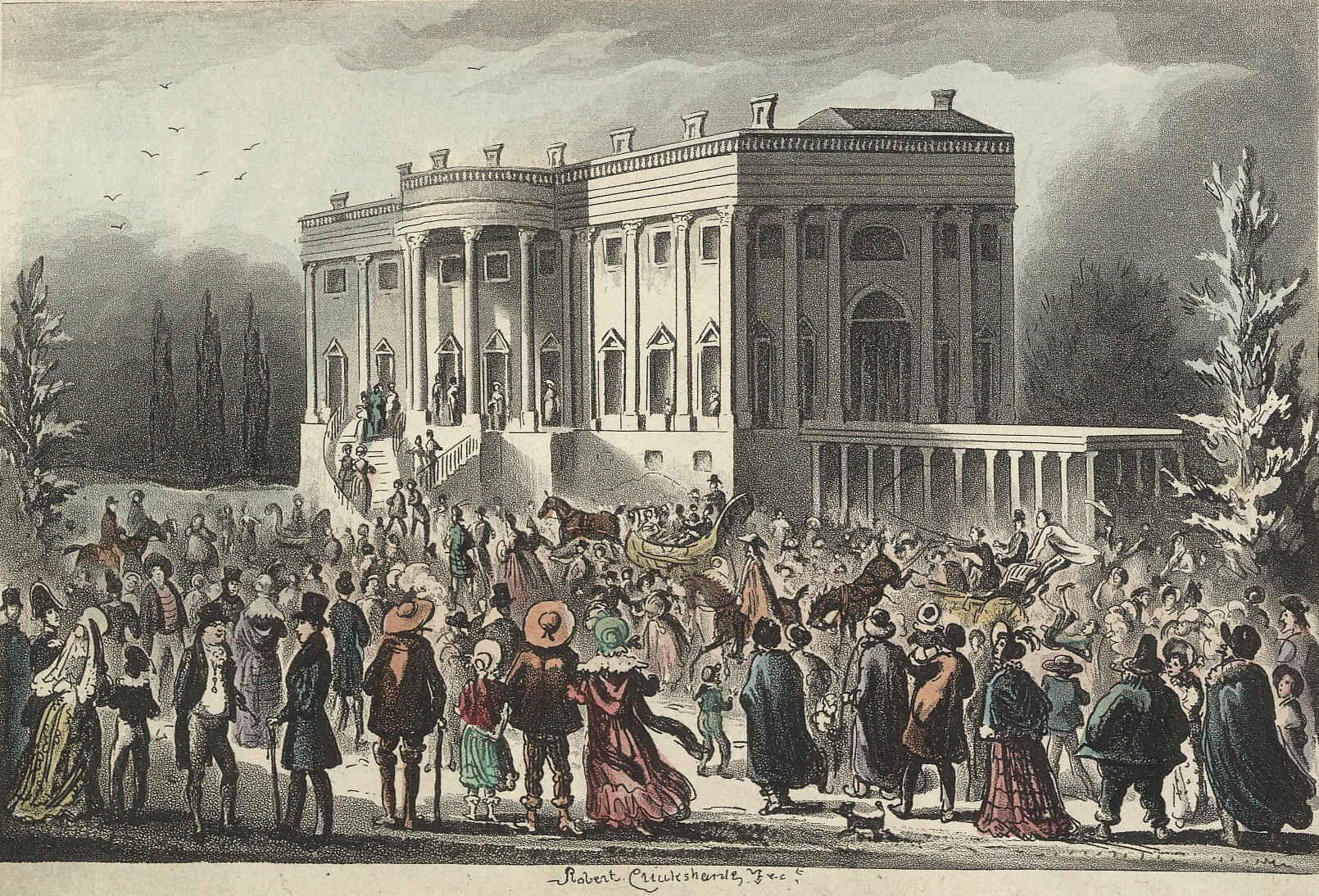
1829 depiction by Robert Cruikshank of U.S. President Andrew Jackson's inauguration

Andrew Jackson was sworn in as president on March 4, 1829. After the inauguration, a mob entered the White House to shake the new president's hand, damaging the furniture and lights. Jackson escaped through the back, and large punch bowls were set up to lure the crowd outside. Conservatives were horrified at this event, and held it up as a portent of terrible things to come from the first Democratic president. When Jackson arrived in Washington, D.C., he was to pay the customary courtesy call on the outgoing president, but he refused to do so. John Quincy Adams responded by refusing to go to the inauguration of Andrew Jackson, similar to his father who did not attend the inauguration of Thomas Jefferson 28 years before. While Jackson did not hold John Quincy Adams among those who had slandered Rachel Jackson, social relations between the two men were cold and impersonal: for example, when Adams heard from a third party that Jackson would invite him to a social dinner he responded that Jackson should send the invitation personally. In his diary Adams also revealed his disgust that not only was his alma mater Harvard College going to award Jackson an honorary Doctor of Law degree (Jackson had not gone to study law in college but had learned law as a law clerk to a judge) but that they were going to do so to a "barbarian" [i.e., someone who had not studied the classical languages of Latin and Greek].

== Electoral College selection ==
| Method of choosing electors | State(s) |
|---|---|
| Each elector appointed by state legislature | Delaware; South Carolina |
| State is divided into electoral districts, with one elector chosen per district by the voters of that district | Maryland; Tennessee |
| Two electors chosen by voters statewide; One elector chosen per congressional district by the voters of that district | Maine |
| One elector chosen per congressional district by the voters of that district; Remaining two electors chosen by the other electors | New York |
| Each elector chosen by voters statewide | (all other states) |

== See also ==
- First inauguration of Andrew Jackson
- History of the United States (1789–1849)
- Jacksonian democracy
- 1828–29 United States House of Representatives elections
- 1828–29 United States Senate elections

== Bibliography ==
- Abramson, Paul; Aldrich, John; Rohde, David (1995). Change and Continuity in the 1992 Elections. CQ Press. ISBN 0871878399.
- Bemis, Samuel Flagg (1956). John Quincy Adams and the Union. Vol. 2. New York, Knopf.
- Cheathem, Mark R. (2013). Andrew Jackson, Southerner.
- Cheathem, Mark R. (2018). The Coming of Democracy: Presidential Campaigning in the Age of Jackson. doi:10.56021/9781421425979. ISBN 9781421425979.
- Cheathem, Mark R. (2014), "Frontiersman or Southern Gentleman? Newspaper Coverage of Andrew Jackson during the 1828 Presidential Campaign", The Readex Report, vol. 9, no. 3
- Cole, Donald B. (2009). Vindicating Andrew Jackson: The 1828 Election and the Rise of the Two Party System. excerpt and text search
- Heidler, David S.; Heidler, Jeanne T. (2018). The Rise of Andrew Jackson: Myth, Manipulation, and the Making of Modern Politics.
- Holt, Michael F. (1992). Political Parties and American Political Development: From the Age of Jackson to the Age of Lincoln.
- Howe, Daniel (2007). What Hath God Wrought: The Transformation of America, 1815–1848. Oxford University Press. ISBN 978-0-19-507894-7.
- Howell, William Huntting (Summer 2010). "Read, Pause, and Reflect!!". Journal of the Early Republic. 30 (2): 293–300. doi:10.1353/jer.0.0149. S2CID 144448483. examines the campaign literature of 1828
- Maiden, Leota Driver (1958). "Colonel John Williams". East Tennessee Historical Society's Publications. 30. Tennessee Historical Commission, University of Tennessee. Knoxville, Tennessee: East Tennessee Historical Society: 7–46. ISSN 0361-6193. OCLC 1137265. FHL 1345572.
- McCormick, Richard P. (1966). The Second American Party System: Party Formation in the Jacksonian Era. Chapel Hill, University of North Carolina Press.
- Parsons, Lynn H. (2009). The Birth of Modern Politics: Andrew Jackson, John Quincy Adams, and the Election of 1828. excerpt and text search
- Remini, Robert V. Election of 1828 in Arthur Schlesinger Jr, ed. The coming to power: Critical presidential elections in American history (1972) pp. 67–90 online
- Remini, Robert V. (1959). Martin Van Buren and the Making of the Democratic Party. New York, Columbia University Press.
- Remini, Robert V. (1981). Andrew Jackson and the Course of American Freedom, 1822–1832. ISBN 9780060148447.
- Sheppard, Simon (October 2007). American media, American bias: The partisan press from broadsheet to blog (Ph.D.). Baltimore, Maryland: Johns Hopkins University. ISBN 978-0-549-31312-0. ProQuest 304616839.
- Swint, Kerwin C. (2006). Mudslingers: The Top 25 Negative Political Campaigns of All Time. Praeger Publishers.
- Vaughn, William Preston (1983). The Antimasonic Party in the United States, 1826-1843. Lexington: University of Kentucky Press. ISBN 9780813114743.
- Ward, John William (1955). Andrew Jackson, Symbol for an Age. New York: Oxford University Press.
- Watson, Harry L. (1990). Liberty and Power: The Politics of Jacksonian America. Farrar, Straus and Giroux. ISBN 0-374-52196-4.
- Wilentz, Sean (2005). The Rise of American Democracy: Jefferson to Lincoln.
