= 1828 United States presidential election in New York =

- November 4, 1828
- Turnout: 80.2%

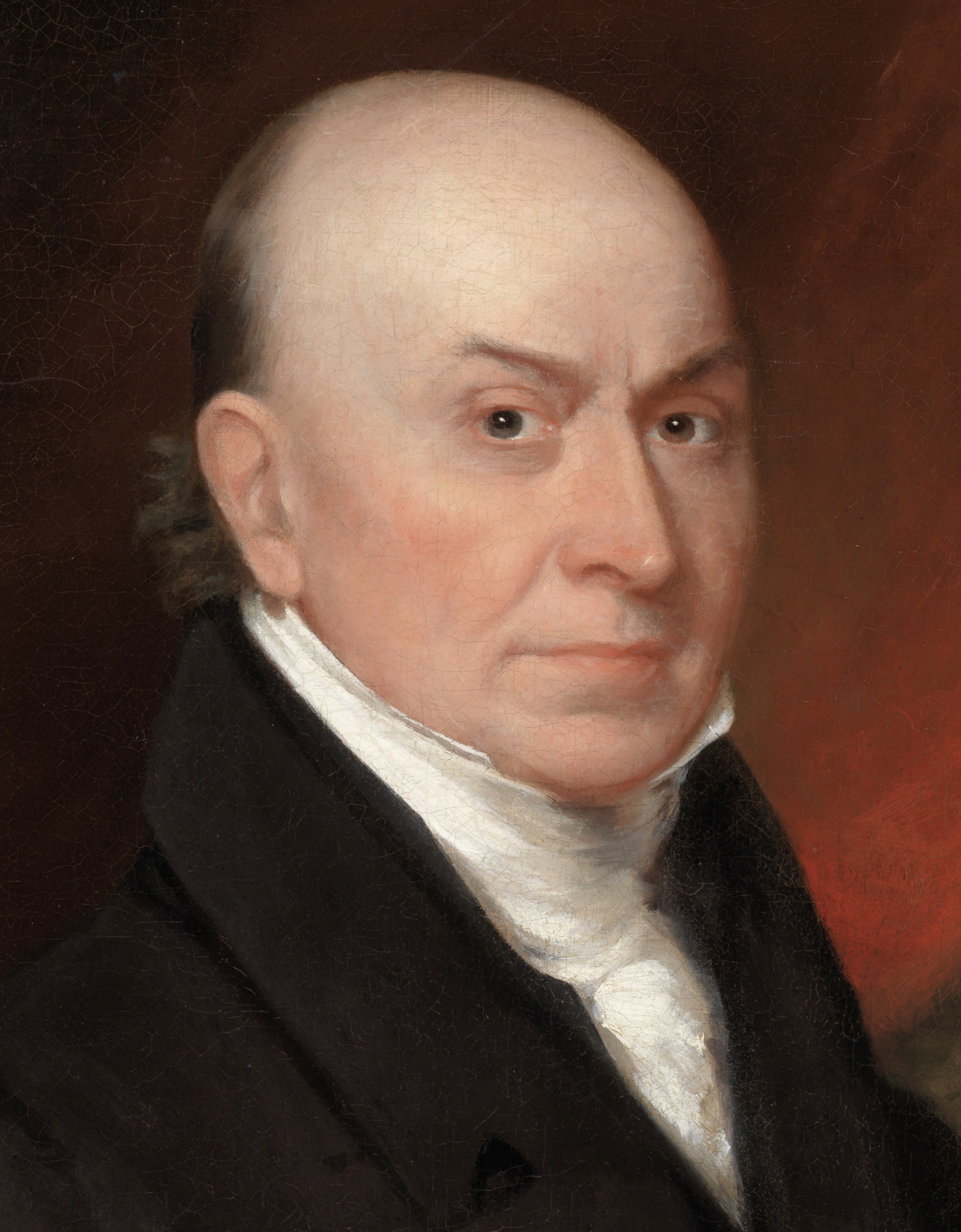
Nominee	Andrew Jackson	John Quincy Adams
Party	Democratic	National Republican
Alliance	-	Anti-Masonic
Home state	Tennessee	Massachusetts
Running mate	John C. Calhoun	Richard Rush
Electoral vote	20	16
Popular vote	139,412	131,563
Percentage	51.45%	48.55%
County results
Jackson
50–60%
60–70%
70–80%
Adams
50–60%
60–70%
70–80%

The 1828 United States presidential election in New York took place on November 4, 1828, as part of the 1828 United States presidential election. Voters chose 36 representatives, or electors to the Electoral College, who voted for President and Vice President. For this election, New York used the congressional district method of choosing electors, with 34 of its electors being chosen by the winner in each of the state's congressional districts, and the remaining two being chosen by the first 34 electors. Jackson won 18 congressional districts while Adams won 16. This election marks the first time New York did not choose its electoral votes through its State Legislature.

Thurlow Weed, Adams' campaign manager in New York, was sympathetic to the anti-masonic movement and support for Adams in New York was aligned with the Anti-Masonic Party.

New York voted for the Democratic candidate, Andrew Jackson, over the National Republican candidate, John Quincy Adams. Jackson won New York by a margin of 2.9%.

== Results ==
1828 United States presidential election in New York
Party	Candidate	Votes	Percentage	Electoral votes
Democratic	Andrew Jackson	139,412	51.45%	20
National Republican	John Quincy Adams (incumbent)	131,563	48.55%	16
Totals		270,975	100.0%	36

== See also ==
- United States presidential elections in New York

== Works cited ==
- Howe, Daniel (2007). What Hath God Wrought: The Transformation of America, 1815–1848. Oxford University Press. ISBN 978-0-19-507894-7.
