= 2016 United States presidential election in Maine =

- November 8, 2016
- Turnout: 72.53%

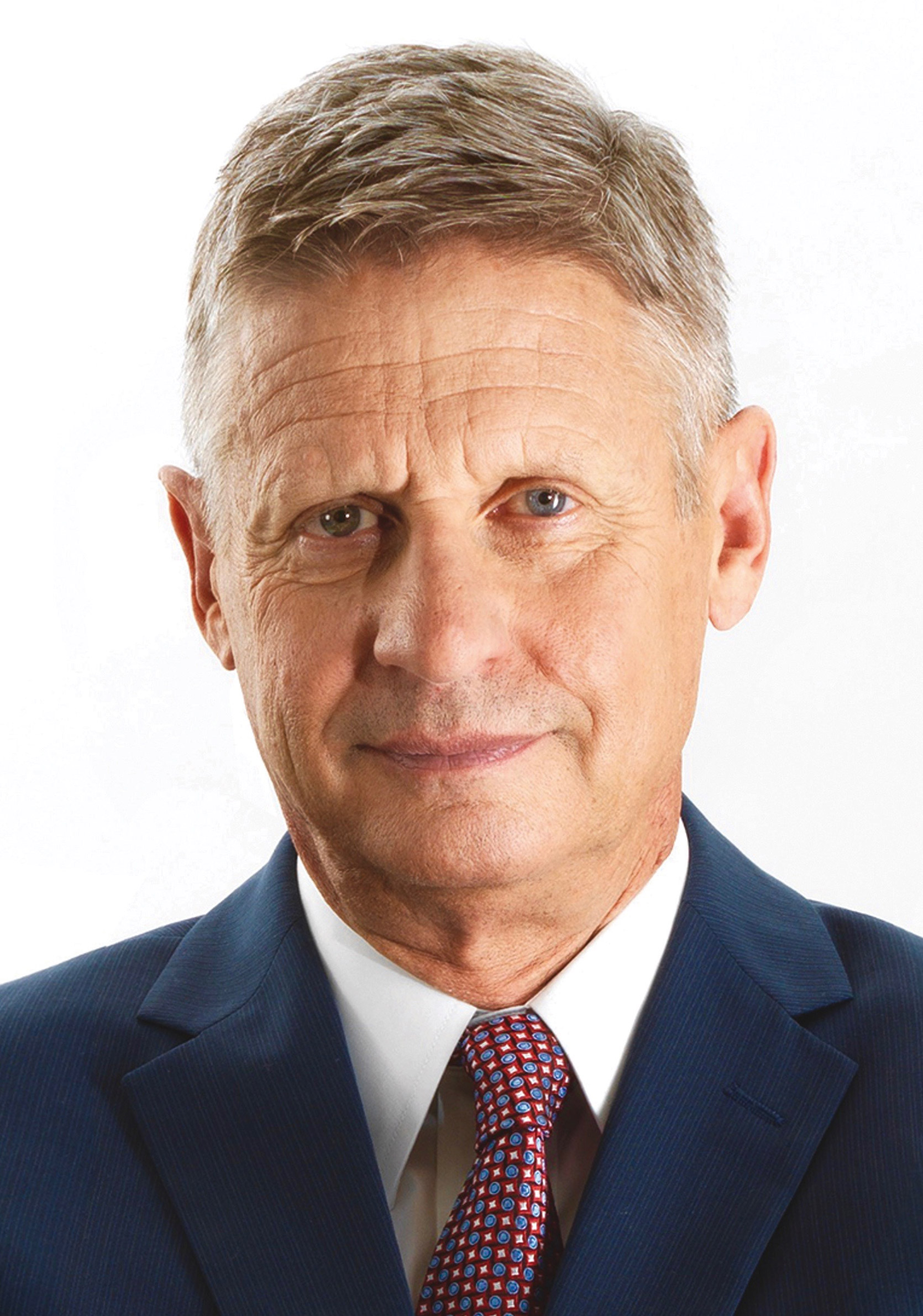
Nominee	Hillary Clinton	Donald Trump	Gary Johnson
Party	Democratic	Republican	Libertarian
Home state	New York	New York	New Mexico
Running mate	Tim Kaine	Mike Pence	Bill Weld
Electoral vote	3	1	0
Popular vote	357,735	335,593	38,105
Percentage	47.83%	44.87%	5.09%

Clinton
40–50%
50–60%
60–70%
70–80%
90–100%
Trump
40–50%
50–60%
60–70%
70–80%
80–90%
90–100%
Stein
60–70%
Tie/No data
President before election
Barack Obama
Democratic
Elected President
Donald Trump
Republican

Treemap of the popular vote by county.

The 2016 United States presidential election in Maine was held on Tuesday, November 8, 2016, as part of the 2016 United States presidential election in which all 50 states plus the District of Columbia participated. Maine voters chose electors to represent them in the Electoral College via a popular vote, pitting the Republican Party's nominee, businessman, reality television host of The Apprentice, media personality and real estate mogul Donald Trump, and running mate Indiana Governor Mike Pence against Democratic Party nominee, former Secretary of State Hillary Clinton, and her running mate Virginia Senator Tim Kaine. Maine has four electoral votes in the Electoral College. Unlike all other states except Nebraska, Maine awards two electoral votes based on the statewide vote, and one vote for each congressional district. The last time it did so was in 1828.

Maine was once one of the most Republican states in the nation. It voted for the Democratic ticket only three times (1912, 1964, and 1968) from 1856 to 1988, but a Democrat has won the state's popular vote in every election since then. Although regarded as a safe blue state prior to the election, Maine shifted dramatically and unexpectedly towards the Republicans, with Clinton's 2.96% margin of victory the narrowest for a Democrat since 1988, when Republicans last won the state, and well down on Obama's 15.29% margin in 2012. As a measure of how Republican Maine once was at the presidential level, Trump is only the third Republican to win the White House without winning the popular vote in Maine after Richard Nixon in 1968 and George W. Bush in both his 2000 and 2004 campaigns. Maine's significant Republican shift was largely attributed to Trump's stronger than expected support from the state's rural white working class voters, a demographic that overwhelmingly supported Obama in the previous two elections.

On election day, Clinton carried Maine's two at-large electoral votes with a plurality and won Maine's 1st congressional district, while Trump won Maine's 2nd congressional district, making him the first Republican to do so since George H. W. Bush in 1988 (Note: Bush won the entire state of Maine in addition to the 2nd district, not on a split vote.) and also making him the first Republican to win an electoral vote from a New England state since George W. Bush won New Hampshire in 2000. In addition to the historic electoral vote split in Maine, this marked the first time that such a split occurred after Maine began awarding electoral votes based on congressional districts in 1972. This was also the second time that a state split its Electoral College vote by congressional district since Nebraska in 2008.

== Caucuses ==
=== Democratic caucuses ===
Democratic caucus results by county. Bernie Sanders

Both Hillary Clinton and Bernie Sanders were on the ballot in Maine for the Democratic Presidential caucuses. Ahead of the caucuses, polling suggested that Sanders had a slight lead over Clinton.

Maine Democratic caucuses, March 6, 2016
Candidate	State convention delegates		Estimated delegates		
Candidate	Count	Percentage	Pledged	Unpledged	Total
Bernie Sanders	2,226	64.17%	17	1	18
Hillary Clinton	1,231	35.49%	8	4	12
Uncommitted	12	0.35%	0	0	0
Total	3,469	100%	25	5	30

Sanders swept all of Maine's counties and also won a large share of the democratic caucus votes in New England.

=== Republican caucuses ===
Republican caucus results by county. Donald Trump: 30–40%; 40–50%; Ted Cruz: 30–40%; 40–50%; 50–60%; 60–70%

Ted Cruz, Marco Rubio, Donald Trump, and John Kasich were all on the ballot for the 2016 Maine state Republican caucuses. The caucuses were held on March 5, 2016, in the following counties in Maine: Cumberland, Franklin, Piscataquis, Somerset, Aroostook, Androscoggin, Sagadahoc, Kennebec, Lincoln, Knox, Hancock, Waldo, Washington, York, Oxford, and Penobscot.

Ted Cruz won the caucus with 45.9% of the vote and was awarded 12 delegates, with Donald Trump in second, receiving 32.59% of the votes and 9 delegates.

Maine Republican municipal caucuses, March 5, 2016
Candidate	Votes	Percentage	Actual delegate count		
Candidate	Votes	Percentage	Bound	Unbound	Total
Ted Cruz	8,550	45.90%	12	0	12
Donald Trump	6,070	32.59%	9	0	9
John Kasich	2,270	12.19%	2	0	2
Marco Rubio	1,492	8.01%	0	0	0
Ben Carson (withdrawn)	132	0.71%	0	0	0
Rand Paul (withdrawn)	55	0.3%	0	0	0
Jeb Bush (withdrawn)	31	0.17%	0	0	0
Carly Fiorina (withdrawn)	17	0.09%	0	0	0
Mike Huckabee (withdrawn)	10	0.05%	0	0	0
Unprojected delegates:			0	0	0
Total:	18,627	100%	23	0	23
Source: The Green Papers

Delegates were awarded to candidates who got 10% or more of the vote proportionally.

=== Green caucuses ===
Maine held a series of caucuses throughout the state between February 27 and March 19. The Maine Green Independent Party didn't compile the results until the state convention on May 7, during which it then assigned delegates based on the results.

On March 13, 2016, it was announced that Jill Stein had won the Maine Green Independent Party caucuses.

Maine Green Party presidential caucus, February 27 – March 19, 2016
Candidate	Votes	Percentage	National delegates
Jill Stein	–	–	–
William Kreml	–	–	–
Kent Mesplay	–	–	–
Sedinam Moyowasifza-Curry	–	–	–
Darryl Cherney	–	–	–
Uncommitted	–	–	–
Total	-	-	-

=== Libertarian convention ===
The Libertarian Party nominated its ticket, former New Mexico Governor Gary Johnson for president and former Massachusetts Governor William Weld for vice president, at its national convention in Orlando, Florida, on May 29, 2016.

Until July 13, 2016, the Libertarian Party was not a legally recognized party in Maine. A 2013 change in the ballot access law permitted a party to gain recognition if they enroll 5,000 Maine voters in the party. The Libertarian Party of Maine turned approximately 6,500 signatures in to the Maine Secretary of State's office in 2015, but Secretary of State Matthew Dunlap invalidated 2,000 of them, bringing the total below the threshold required. The party then sued Dunlap, claiming Maine's ballot access requirements were unconstitutionally unreasonable. While losing an initial ruling by U.S. District Court Judge John Woodcock, Woodcock later ordered that they be given until July 12 to collect the necessary signatures. On July 13, Dunlap certified that 5,150 signatures had been validated, surpassing the threshold required to allow their candidates on the ballot. Maintenance of the status required obtaining 10,000 presidential votes in the general election.

== General election ==
=== Predictions ===
Source	Ranking	As of
Los Angeles Times	Safe D	November 6, 2016
CNN	Safe D	November 4, 2016
Cook Political Report	Safe D	November 7, 2016
Electoral-vote.com	Likely D	November 8, 2016
Rothenberg Political Report	Likely D	November 7, 2016
Sabato's Crystal Ball	Likely D	November 7, 2016
RealClearPolitics	Tossup	November 8, 2016
Fox News	Lean D	November 7, 2016
NBC	Lean D	November 7, 2016

Source	1st district	2nd district	As of
CNN	Safe D	Lean D	November 4, 2016
Sabato's Crystal Ball	Safe D	Lean R (flip)	November 7, 2016
RealClearPolitics	Lean D	Tossup	November 8, 2016
NBC	Safe D	Tossup	November 7, 2016

=== Polling ===
Maine distributes 2 EVs based on the statewide vote and 1 EV for each congressional district's vote. Statewide, Hillary Clinton won every pre-election poll but one with margins ranging from 3 to 11 points. The average of the last two polls showed Hillary Clinton ahead of Donald Trump 46.5% to 41% statewide.

==== Statewide Polls ====
Poll source	Date(s) administered	Sample size	Margin of error	Hillary Clinton (D)	Donald Trump (R)	Others	Undecided
Maine People's Resource Center	November 2–3, 2016	450	4.7%	45%	39%	11%	5%
Maine People's Resource Center	October 24–26, 2016	429	4.7%	45%	33%	13%	9%
Maine People's Resource Center	October 14–15, 2016	469	4.5%	46%	36%	12%	7%
Maine People's Resource Center	October 7–9, 2016	468	4.5%	49%	32%	11%	8%
University of New Hampshire	September 15–20, 2016			50%	28%	14%	—
Maine People's Resource Center	September 15–17, 2016	440	4.7%	41%	30%	17%	12%
University of New Hampshire	June 15–21, 2016			48%	33%	16%	3%

==== 1st congressional district ====
Hillary Clinton won every poll in the 1st Congressional District. The average of the last three polls had her leading 49% to 36%.

==== 2nd congressional district ====
Donald Trump won most of the polls conducted in Maine's 2nd district. He was ahead anywhere from 3 to 11 points, although Hillary Clinton won the last poll 44% to 42%. An average of the last two polls showed Trump leading Hillary Clinton 41.5% to 41%.

Poll source	Date(s) administered	Sample size	Margin of error	Hillary Clinton (D)	Donald Trump (R)	Others	Undecided
Maine People's Resource Center	November 2–3, 2016	405	4.9%	41%	43%	10%	6%
Maine People's Resource Center	October 24–26, 2016	382	5%	38%	41%	11%	9%
Maine People's Resource Center	October 14–15, 2016	420	4.8%	38%	37%	14%	11%
Maine People's Resource Center	October 7–9, 2016	424	4.8%	39%	40%	13%	8%
University of New Hampshire	September 15–20, 2016			34%	48%	16%	—
Maine People's Resource Center	September 15–17, 2016	396	4.9%	33%	44%	14%	9%
University of New Hampshire	June 15–21, 2016			36%	37%	23%	4%

=== Results ===
2016 United States presidential election in Maine
Party	Candidate	Votes	%
Democratic	Hillary Clinton	357,735	47.83%
Republican	Donald Trump	335,593	44.87%
Libertarian	Gary Johnson	38,105	5.09%
Green	Jill Stein	14,251	1.91%
Independent	Evan McMullin (write-in)	1,887	0.25%
Constitution	Darrell L. Castle (write-in)	333	0.04%
Independent	Laurence Kotlikoff (write-in)	16	0.00%
Independent	Cherunda Lynn Fox (write-in)	7	0.00%
Invalid or blank votes		23,965	3.10%
Majority		22,142	2.96%
Total votes		771,892	100.00%
Turnout			72.53
Democratic win			

==== By county ====
County	Hillary Clinton Democratic		Donald Trump Republican		Various candidates Other parties		Margin		Total votes cast
County	#	%	#	%	#	%	#	%	Total votes cast
Androscoggin	23,009	41.38%	28,227	50.77%	4,365	7.85%	-5,218	-9.39%	55,601
Aroostook	13,386	38.14%	19,419	55.33%	2,292	6.53%	-6,033	-17.19%	35,097
Cumberland	102,981	59.94%	57,709	33.59%	11,128	6.47%	45,272	26.35%	171,818
Franklin	7,016	42.55%	7,918	48.02%	1,554	9.43%	-902	-5.47%	16,488
Hancock	16,117	50.16%	13,705	42.65%	2,308	7.19%	2,412	7.51%	32,130
Kennebec	29,302	44.26%	31,675	47.84%	5,231	7.90%	-2,373	-3.58%	66,208
Knox	12,443	53.76%	9,148	39.52%	1,556	6.72%	3,295	14.24%	23,147
Lincoln	10,241	47.63%	9,727	45.24%	1,535	7.13%	514	2.39%	21,503
Oxford	12,172	39.01%	16,210	51.95%	2,819	9.04%	-4,038	-12.94%	31,201
Penobscot	32,838	40.77%	41,622	51.68%	6,080	7.55%	-8,784	-10.91%	80,540
Piscataquis	3,098	33.74%	5,406	58.88%	678	7.38%	-2,308	-25.14%	9,182
Sagadahoc	10,664	49.33%	9,304	43.04%	1,648	7.63%	1,360	6.29%	21,616
Somerset	9,092	34.88%	15,001	57.55%	1,971	7.57%	-5,909	-22.67%	26,064
Waldo	10,440	45.98%	10,378	45.70%	1,889	8.32%	62	0.28%	22,707
Washington	6,075	37.12%	9,093	55.56%	1,197	7.32%	-3,018	-18.44%	16,365
York	55,844	48.87%	50,403	44.11%	8,027	7.02%	5,441	4.76%	114,274
Total	357,735	47.83%	335,593	44.87%	54,599	7.30%	22,142	2.96%	747,927

Counties that flipped from Democratic to Republican

- Androscoggin (largest city: Lewiston)
- Aroostook (largest city: Presque Isle)
- Franklin (largest town: Farmington)
- Kennebec (largest city: Augusta)
- Oxford (largest town: Rumford)
- Penobscot (largest city: Bangor)
- Somerset (largest town: Skowhegan)
- Washington (largest city: Calais)

==== By congressional district ====
Clinton won the southern 1st district, while Trump carried the more rural 2nd district.

District	Clinton	Trump	Representative
1st	54%	39%	Chellie Pingree
2nd	41%	51%	Bruce Poliquin

== Analysis ==
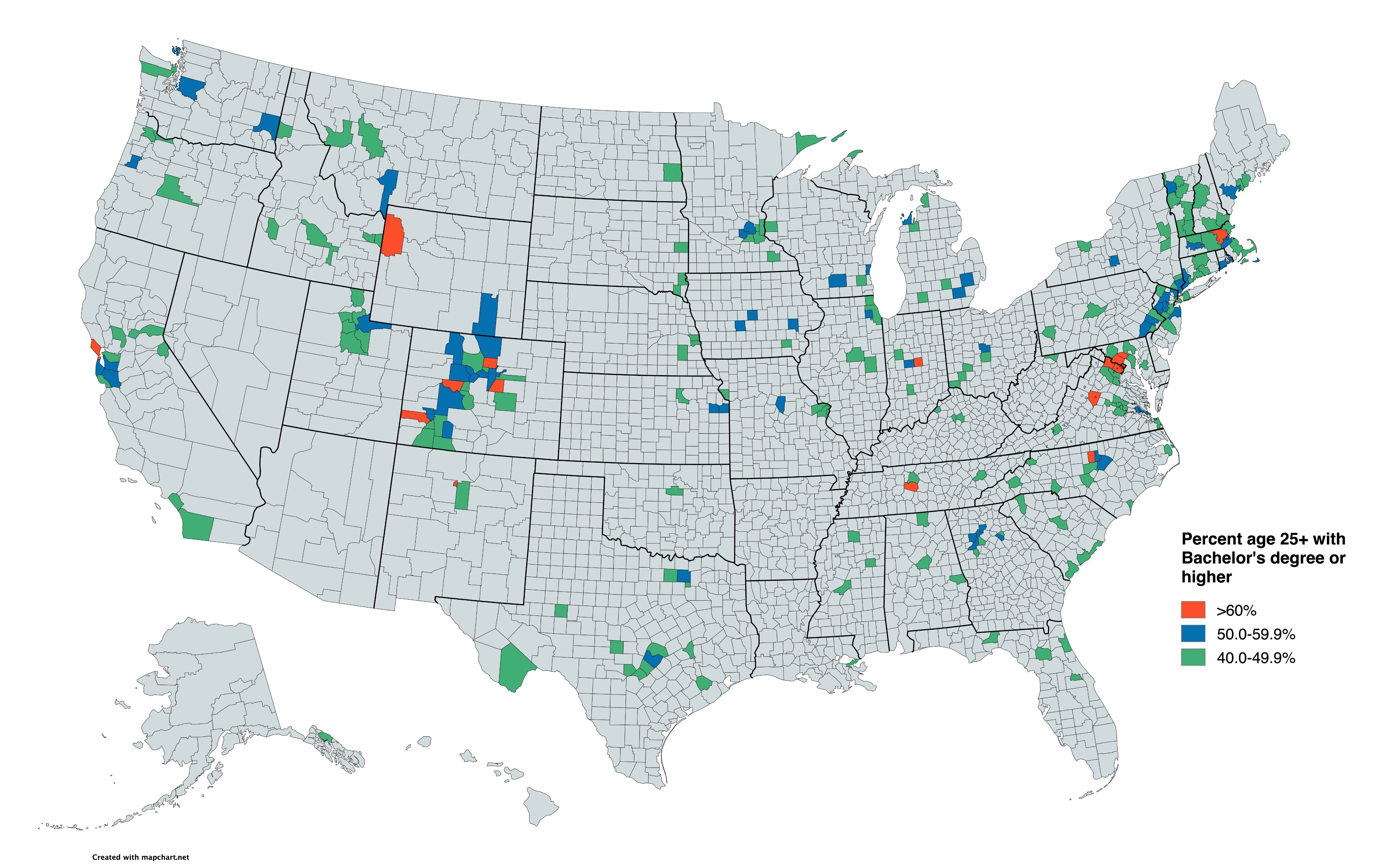
A map of the most college-educated counties in the United States

Overall, Maine as a whole shifted right by 12.33%, with its 1st and 2nd districts shifting right by 6.58% and 18.85%, respectively; the 2nd district's rightward shift was the strongest such shift seen in any electoral vote in 2016.

This was because Maine’s 1st congressional district contains the most highly educated counties in the state, while Maine’s 2nd congressional district does not. Although Trump gained in both districts, he made his largest gains among white voters without college degrees.

== See also ==
- United States presidential elections in Maine
- 2016 Democratic Party presidential debates and forums
- 2016 Democratic Party presidential primaries
- 2016 Republican Party presidential debates and forums
- 2016 Republican Party presidential primaries
