= 1828 United States presidential election in Massachusetts =

- October 31 – December 2, 1828
- Turnout: 25.7% ▼3.3 pp
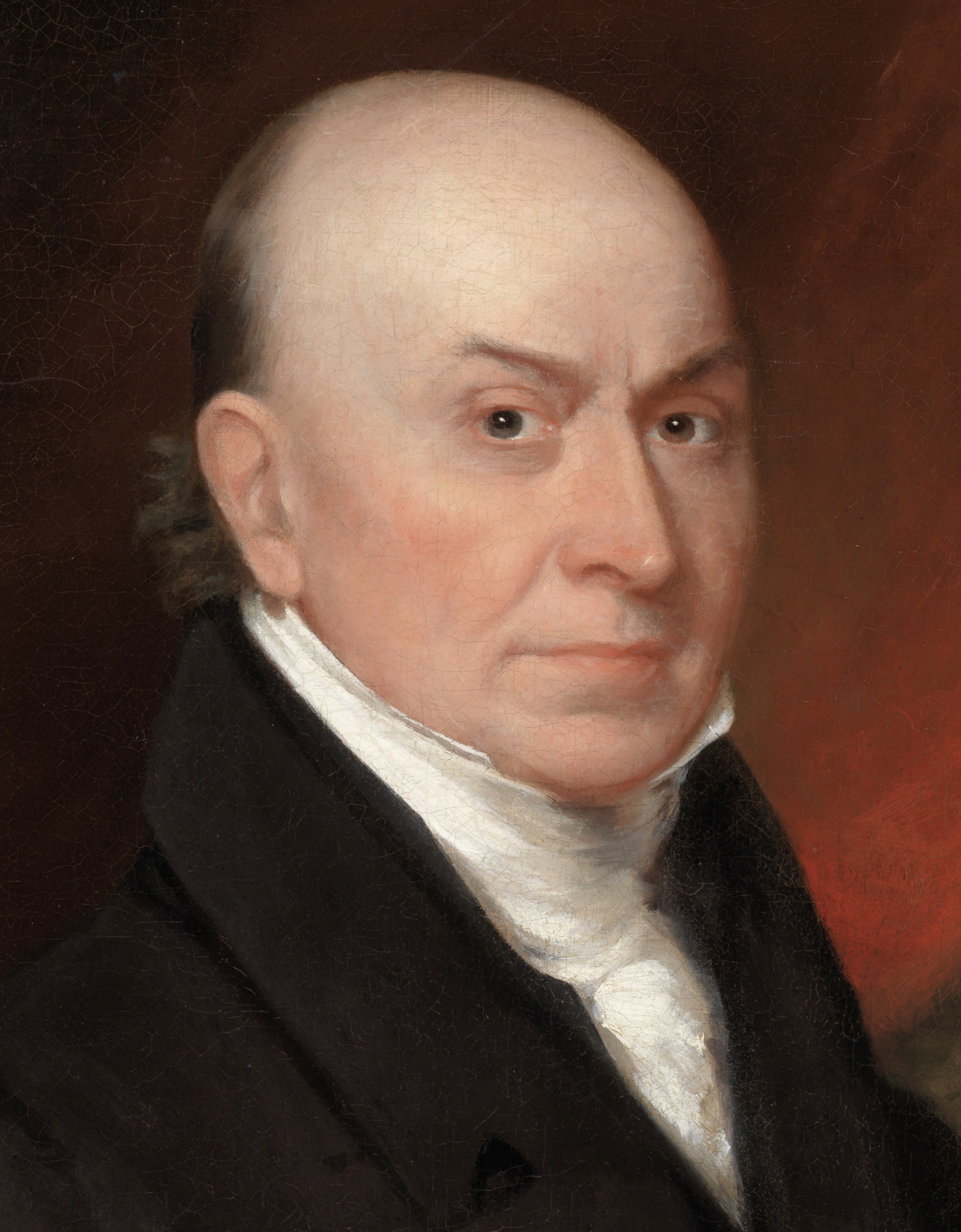

Nominee	John Quincy Adams	Andrew Jackson
Party	National Republican	Democratic
Home state	Massachusetts	Tennessee
Running mate	Richard Rush	John C. Calhoun
Electoral vote	15	0
Popular vote	29,836	6,012
Percentage	76.36%	15.39%
County results
Adams
60–70%
80–90%
90–100%
No data/vote
President before election
John Quincy Adams
National Republican Party
Elected President
Andrew Jackson
Democratic Party

The 1828 United States presidential election in Massachusetts took place between October 31 and December 2, 1828, as part of the 1828 United States presidential election. Voters chose 15 representatives, or electors to the Electoral College, who voted for president and vice president.

Massachusetts voted for the National Republican candidate, incumbent president John Quincy Adams, over the Democratic candidate, Andrew Jackson. Adams won Massachusetts by a landslide margin of 60.97%.

With 76.36% of the popular vote, Adams' home state would prove to be his second strongest victory in the 1828 election after neighboring Rhode Island. This would be the last election until 1976 that the incumbent president lost reelection but won his home state.

== Results ==
1828 United States presidential election in Massachusetts
Party	Candidate	Votes	Percentage	Electoral votes
National Republican	John Quincy Adams (incumbent)	29,836	76.36%	15
Democratic	Andrew Jackson	6,012	15.39%	0
N/A	Other	3,226	8.26%	0
Totals		39,074	100.0%	15

== See also ==
- United States presidential elections in Massachusetts
