= Kerwin Swint =

American political scientist and author (born 1962)

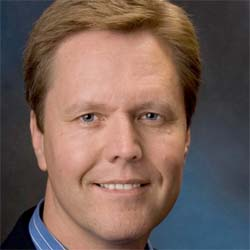
Kerwin Swint

Kerwin Swint (born March 21, 1962) is an American political scientist and author, known for his research and writing in the fields of political campaigns, mass media, and political history. He or his work has appeared in a number of national and international media, including CNN, FOX News, the BBC, the ABC program The View, The Wall Street Journal, the Los Angeles Times, The Washington Post, NPR, The Toronto Star, The Daily Mail (UK), The Guardian (UK), National Journal, Mental Floss, Publishers Weekly, Salon, Slate, The Chronicle of Higher Education, and numerous other media.

A native Atlantan, Swint graduated from the University of Georgia in 1984 with a bachelor's degree in political science. After working in Washington, D.C. for several years he returned to Georgia and earned a master's degree and then a Ph.D. He is currently a tenured professor at Kennesaw State University outside Atlanta. From 1998 to 2004 he operated a political campaign consulting firm, Southeast Political Group, Inc.

== Mudslingers ==
Swint's book "Mudslingers: The 25 Dirtiest Political Campaigns of All Time" chronicles what he and other scholars believe to be the most negative political campaigns in history. The book has been cited frequently since its publication in 2006 by academics and journalists.

== Selected publications ==
- The King Whisperers: Power Behind the Throne, From Rasputin to Rove, Union Square Press (2011) ISBN 1-4027-7201-7
- Dark Genius: The Influential Career of Legendary Political Operative and Fox News Founder Roger Ailes, Union Square Press (2008) ISBN 1-4027-5445-0
- Mudslingers: The 25 Dirtiest Political Campaigns of All Time, Praeger (2006) ISBN 0-275-98510-5
