= 1828 United States presidential election in Rhode Island =

- October 31 – December 2, 1828
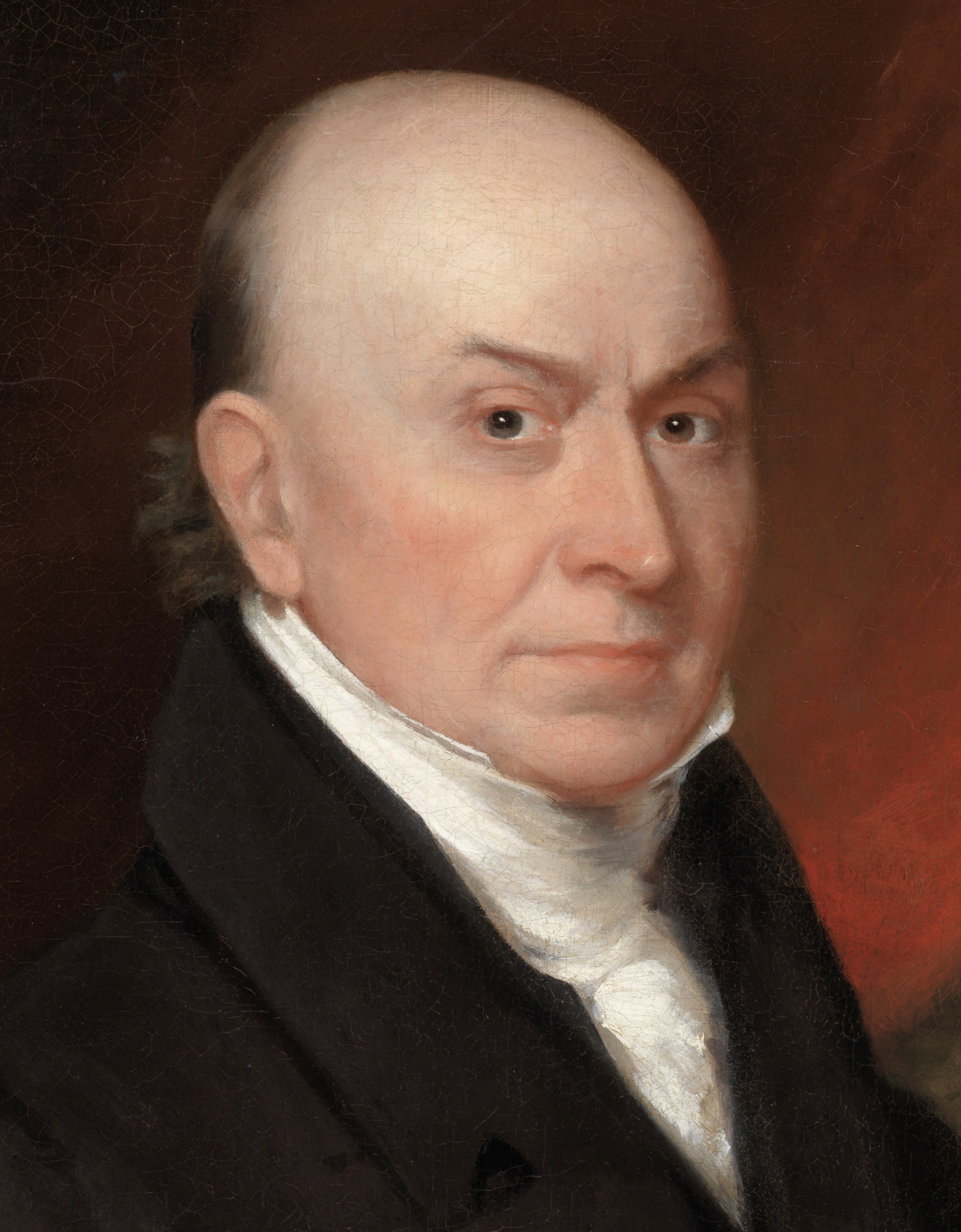

Nominee	John Quincy Adams	Andrew Jackson
Party	National Republican	Democratic
Home state	Massachusetts	Tennessee
Running mate	Richard Rush	John C. Calhoun
Electoral vote	4	0
Popular vote	2,754	821
Percentage	77.03%	22.97%

Adams
50-60%
60–70%
70–80%
80–90%
90-100%
Jackson
50-60%
No data

The 1828 United States presidential election in Rhode Island took place between October 31 and December 2, 1828, as part of the 1828 United States presidential election. Voters chose four representatives, or electors to the Electoral College, who voted for President and Vice President.

Rhode Island voted for the National Republican candidate, John Quincy Adams, over the Democratic candidate, Andrew Jackson. Adams won Rhode Island by a margin of 54.06%.

With 77.03% of the popular vote, Adams' victory in Rhode Island made it his strongest state in the 1828 election.

== Results ==
1828 United States presidential election in Rhode Island
Party	Candidate	Votes	Percentage	Electoral votes
National Republican	John Quincy Adams (incumbent)	2,754	77.03%	4
Democratic	Andrew Jackson	821	22.97%	0
Totals		3,575	100.0%	4

== See also ==
- United States presidential elections in Rhode Island
