= McNairy =

McNairy is a surname. Notable people with the surname include:

- Boyd McNairy (1785–1856), American physician
- Francine G. McNairy, American academic administrator
- John McNairy (1762–1837), United States federal judge in Tennessee
- Mark McNairy (born 1961), American fashion designer
- Nathaniel A. McNairy (1779–1851), American planter and enslaver
- Scoot McNairy, American actor

== See also ==
- McNairy, Tennessee, an unincorporated community in the United States
- McNairy County, Tennessee, county located in the U.S. state of Tennessee
