= Joseph Erwin =

American businessman (1762–1829)

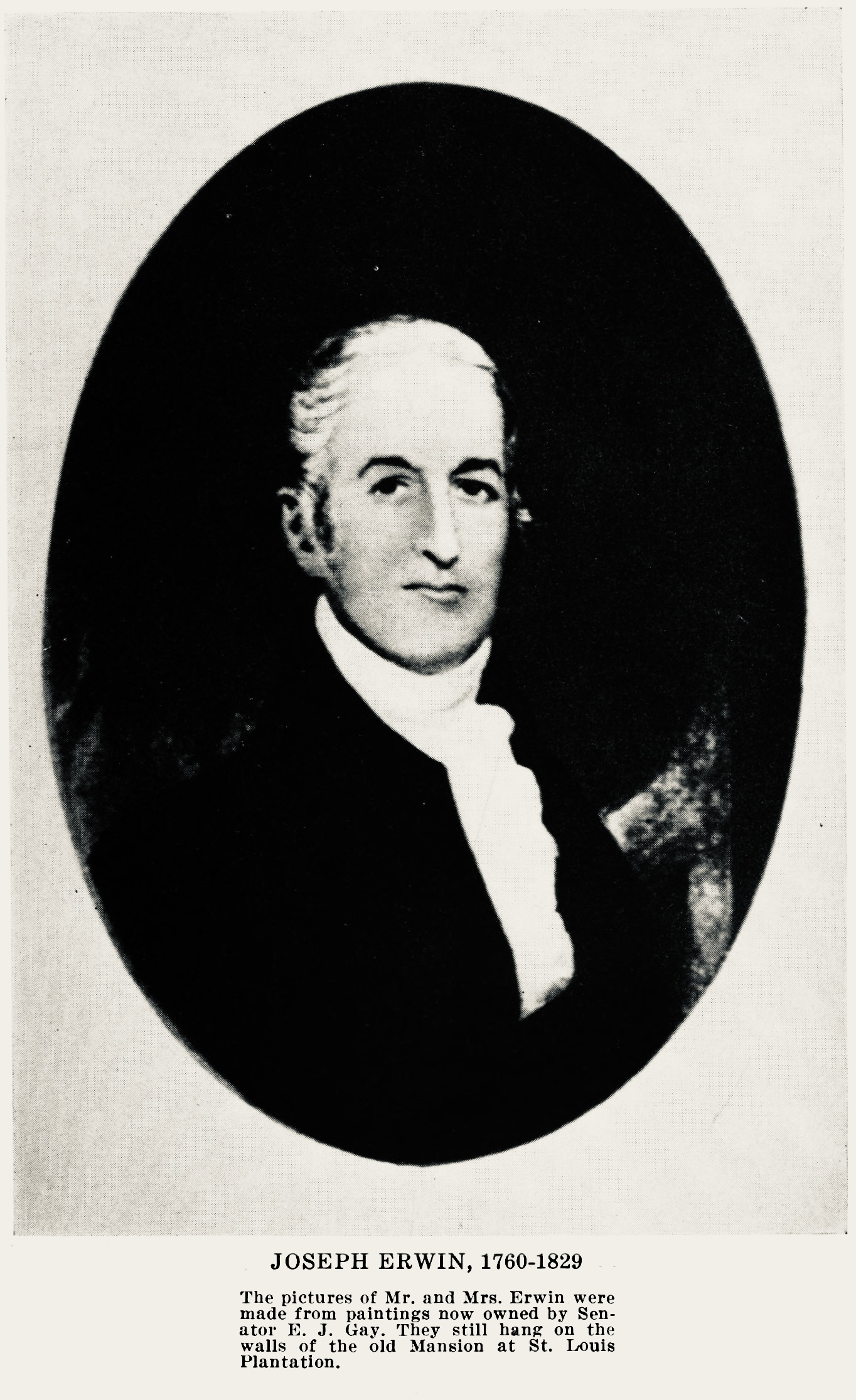
- Born: 1762; Guilford County, North Carolina, U.S.
- Died: April 14, 1829; Near Bayou Plaquemine, Iberville Parish, Louisiana, U.S.

Joseph Erwin (1762 – April 14, 1829) was an American racehorse owner, owner of cotton and sugar plantations, and a slave trader. He is best known for the enmity between him and future U.S. president Andrew Jackson. Their conflict over their competing thoroughbred racehorses, Erwin's Ploughboy and Jackson's Truxton, led to the fatal 1806 duel between Jackson and Erwin's son-in-law Charles Dickinson. After Dickinson's death at Jackson's hand, Erwin moved to Louisiana where he owned as many as seven plantations and hundreds of slaves. He ended up heavily in debt. Erwin died by suicide in 1829.

== Biography ==
Joseph Erwin was born to Robert and Martha Erwin in 1761 in Guilford County, British North Carolina. He served as an officer in the American Revolutionary War, ending as a captain. In 1782 there was a marriage bond filed for Joseph Erwin and "Livy McMamey" in Guilford County. Erwin's bondsman and witness was land speculator David Allison. "Livy McMamey" was born Lavinia Thompson; her first husband had been a man named James McKemey. Lavinia Thompson's brother Jason Thompson married Catherine McNairy, a sister of John McNairy, Nathaniel McNairy, and Boyd McNairy.

In April 1793 Erwin seems to have lived in what is now Claiborne County, Tennessee, in the far northeastern angle of the state, as placed an ad in the Knoxville Gazette seeking to recover a runaway slave named Jim, described as a "country born negro" who "laughs very loud, and is fond of children." Erwin was an early settler of Middle Tennessee, dating to the Fort Nashborough days. After he arrived in the Nashville area in the 1790s he began growing cotton on what was called Peach Blossom plantation. In 1797 he bought 540 acres of land near Richland Creek that had been part of the North Carolina military land grant of Francis Hodge. In 1800 he bought another 100 acres of Hodge's grant, and then in 1805 he added another 50 acres, purchased from James Martin, to the property that eventually became known as the Haynes place. In around 1803 Erwin's slaves and contractors built a house "on what became Craighead Ave. Originally a brick Georgian-style mansion with a drive that fronted on what became the Richland Turnpike (West End Ave), Peach Blossom was surrounded by 650 acres. The mansion had a 50-foot entrance hall and a classic spiral stairway across from the front door. " In January 1805 he was a signatory to a petition protesting the court-martial of Thomas Butler, probably produced at the behest of Andrew Jackson and sent to Thomas Jefferson's government, recorded in official state papers under the title "Disobedience of Orders Justified on the Grounds of Illegality."

Around 1880 an old colonel named Willoughby Williams wrote up his reminiscences of Old Nashville, including a description of the neighborhood in which Erwin had dwelt:

"I now return to the other fork leading from Cockrill's Spring to Richland Creek, which was known as the Harding Pike. The first man of note on this road was Capt. Joseph Erwin, who settled on this place in 1805. He was a very wealthy man, having large sugar plantations at Plaquemines, La., though he resided in Tennessee. He was the father-in-law of Charles Dickinson, who was killed by Gen. Jackson in a duel, and was buried on this place, near the turnpike. Dickinson also lived in this neighborhood, in sight, on the opposite side of the road. Capt. Erwin was the uncle of Governor Newton Cannon, and was the friend and backer of Cannon in the great Clover-Bottom race between Gen. Jackson and Governor Cannon, which resulted in the duel between Dickinson and Jackson. The next man was Charles Bosley, a brother of John Bosley, who married the sister of Gen. Robertson. Mr. Charles Bosley was a large trader and operator at Natchez, Miss., and settled on this place in 1818. I neglected to mention some points of interest in regard to Capt. Erwin which are important. He raised a large family, among them three daughters, one of whom married Charles Dickinson; after his death she married Mr. John. B. Craighead; another married Col. Andrew Hynes; and a third married William Blount Robertson, a brother of Dr. Felix Robertson. He was a lawyer by profession, owned and lived at the place where Mark Cockrill lived and died. The next man was Capt. John Nichols, who settled on his place in 1807. He was the bosom friend of Capt. Erwin and Mr. Charles Dickinson.

=== Ploughboy, Truxton, and the Jackson–Dickinson duel ===
Joseph Erwin raised racehorses on his farm near Bosley's Springs in the vicinity of Nashville. According to an 1873 article called "Memories of the Turf" by Balie Peyton:

"In the fall of 1805, Capt. Joseph Erwin offered to run his horse Tanner, a son of imp. Tanner, against any horse in the world, four mile heats, for $5,000 a side, the person accepting the bet to name at the post. Gen. Jackson accented the banter, and trained 16 horses, Truxton, and Greyhound among them. He started the Greyhound, and won the race at three heats over the Clover Bottom course. At the same time and place, Gen. Jackson had a match of $2,000 a side in cash notes on Truxton, against Capt. Erwin's Plow Boy, two mile heats, but Plow Boy being amiss, Capt. Erwin paid the forfeit. A misunderstanding arose concerning this last mentioned race which was the occasion, but not the cause, of a fatal duel between Gen. Jackson and Mr. Dickinson."

To summarize, Joseph Erwin owned a horse named Tanner that lost a race to Greyhound, a horse owned by Jackson. Erwin wanted a rematch of sorts, with his horse Ploughboy racing against Jackson's Truxton. The race was planned for November 28, 1805, with a $2,000 purse, but Erwin withdrew Ploughboy before the race, and paid the agreed-upon $800 forfeit fee. There was a disagreement about which type of "note" (cash equivalent) would be used to pay the fee, but it was resolved and Jackson got paid. After that, there was a long run of masculine posturing, snippy newspaper columns, hostile letters, and all manner of 1805 Tennessee interpersonal drama, including an episode where Jackson caned a man in a tavern because he was not a good enough "gentleman" to be worth dueling. Things escalated, a duel challenge was issued, the two Tennesseans stepped over to Kentucky so as to not violate their state's anti-dueling laws, and a duel was fought. Dickinson died, Jackson took a bullet to the chest and survived. Jackson biographer James Parton claimed in 1861 that what really set Jackson off was Dickinson insulting his wife but research by historian Mark R. Cheathem found that "Nowhere in the private correspondence or public exchanges that took place during these months, however, does Rachel's name appear as a pretext for the enmity between the two men." After the fact, Erwin wrote in a public letter:

"It may not be improper before this subject is dismissed to enquire whether the proceedings on the field were strictly proper? and whether general Jackson had a right, according to the laws of dueling, to recock his pistol after having snapped it? It is said it was agreed that a snap should not be considered a fire, granted, but was it not also agreed that nothing which was not committed to writing should be considered as binding or having effect? A snap not to be considered as a fire was not committed to writing, consequently, it was not one of the stipulations in the agreement, neither was it warranted by the usual practice; yet such was the cruel fate of the unfortunate Dickinson, he gallantly maintained his ground, and fell a victim to this unguarded, illiberal and unjust advantage. Peace be to his manes, respect to his memory, which will be ever dear to his friend."

Erwin was administrator of his son-in-law's estate and placed a newspaper ad stating that on January 12, 1808, he would be hiring out Dickinson's estate slaves for a 12-month term.

=== Business in the lower Mississippi River valley ===
According to a master's thesis done at Louisiana State University in 1933 and later republished in Louisiana Historical Quarterly, "On one occasion when the larder ran low and there were no finances with which to meet the need, Captain Erwin, together with a friend, disappeared from home for six months and speculated in ginseng which was in great demand at that time."

In 1807, Joseph Erwin and his wife relocated to Iberville Parish, Territory of Orleans, where they established a plantation just below Plaquemine. The plantation was purchased from Nicholas Rousseau and consisted of five and a half arpents of land along the river, just below the confluence of the river and Bayou Plaquemine.

In 1807 he had a trunk stolen at the Natchez, Mississippi boat landing containing six weeks worth of "bills of sale for negroes" and 50-odd promissory notes totaling US$20,000 (equivalent to $439,773 in 2025). In April 1807, Erwin and his partner Abraham Wright placed an ad in the Mississippi Messenger under the heading "CAUTION AGAINST IMPOSITION." The ad stated, "Sometime during the night of the 4th inst. some Person or Persons entered a Flat Bottomed Boat, lying at the Landing, within the City of Natchez, belonging to the undersigned, and feloniously carried away a CHEST, containing between Two and Three Hundred Dollars in Cash, Promissory Notes and other Papers, of the following Description, to wit..." and at the end of a list of 50 or so promissory notes, they added that they were also seeking "Two Red Morocco Pocket-Books, Containing a Number of Notes, Due Bills, and Bills of Sale for Negroes." The paperwork would have had the names Joseph Erwin, John Erwin, Erwin & Billings, or Erwin & Wright. If the notes and papers were brought to the Messenger office or to Col. F. L. Claiborne, the reward would be $100, no questions asked. The following month they placed a similar ad in a Nashville newspaper, stating that the total value of the notes was approximately US$20,000 (equivalent to $439,773 in 2025), and that they were all dated to between March 24 and May 4, 1807.

Erwin paid US$10,000 (equivalent to $219,886 in 2025) for his first plantation in June 1807. Over the next 20 years he bought and sold 30,000 arpents of plantation land, with his holdings running miles along the riverfront. He also bought and sold hundreds of slaves. The plantations were primarily planted in cotton and provisions; some of the land was put in sugarcane starting in the 1820s. According to his major biographer, "Erwin was by nature and practice a trader and 'trafficker' and he found the less highly developed section just to his liking. He began building his estate by buying up small adjacent farms and organizing them into great plantations, or by selling them to others, most often at large profits, for the same purpose."

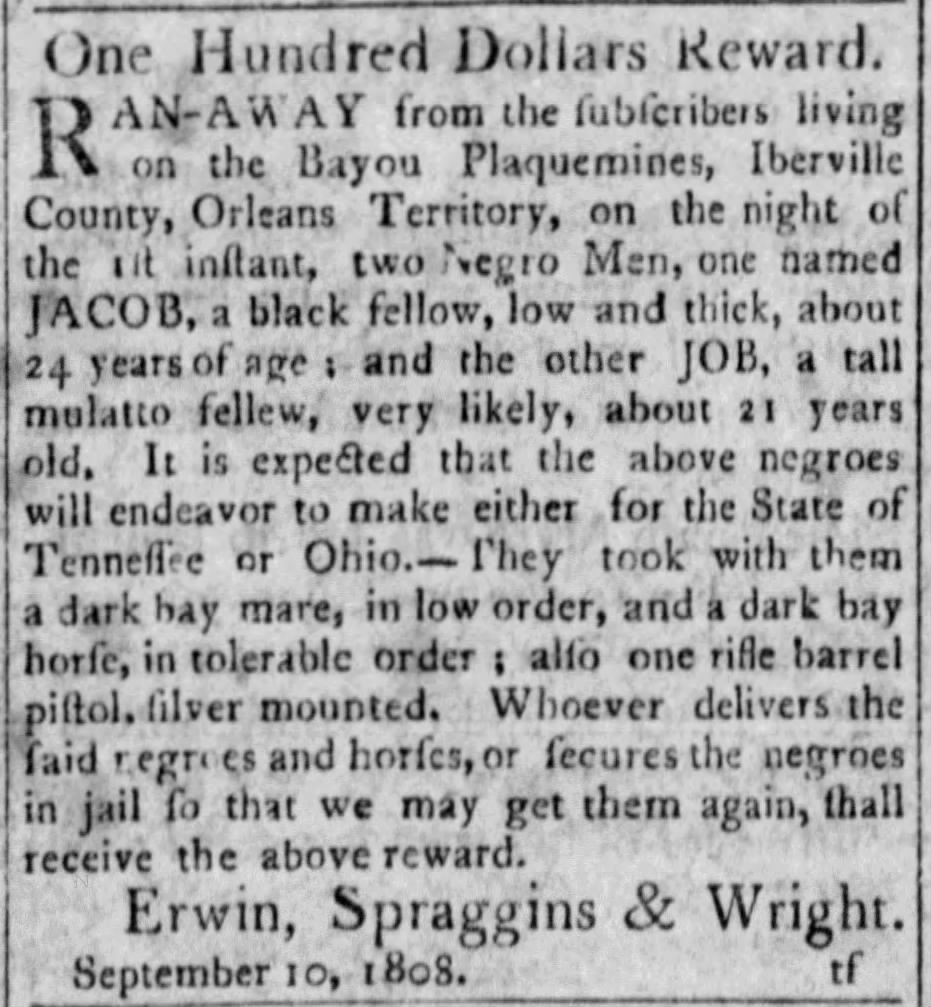
"One Hundred Dollars Reward" The Weekly Democrat, Natchez, September 23, 1808

In 1808, Erwin, Spraggins & Wright offered a $100 reward for the capture of 24-year-old Jacob and 21-year-old Job, who had been enslaved by them near the Bayou Plaquemines, Iberville Parish, Orleans Territory. Erwin, Spraggins, and Wright thought that Jacob and Job would try to get to Tennessee or Ohio with their two stolen horses and stolen silver-mounted one rifle barrel pistol. The full name of Spraggins was Samuel Spraggins.

In June 1809, there were six letters waiting for Capt. Joseph Erwin at the Natchez post office and two at the Pinckneyville post office in Mississippi Territory.

In 1812 Erwin offered a $10 reward for the return of a 21-year-old mulatto slave named John, as well as $10 each for a trio of Virginia-born slaves, 25-year-old Roger, 22-year-old Sam, and a 26-year-old "dark mulatto man" all last seen "descending the river in a skiff." Sam had been advertised as "nearly 6 feet high." On September 29, 1813, the Feliciana Parish jailor took in "a negro fellow; named Sam, very large and well made, says he belongs to Joseph Erwin on the coast."

In February 1813 Erwin's agent was looking for an 18-year-old Creole slave named Jim who had a "handsome countenance," was "burned on both cheeks," spoke fluent French but minimal English, and had "come down on a raft last week and has since absconded."

By 1817 Erwin had raised his reward rate to $20 per slave and was looking to recover 30-year-old Tom who was tall, had a "yellow complexion" and a limp, and as well as a "yellow fellow" in his early 20s named Jim. Jim had grey eyes, was not as tall as Tom, and was described as "stout formed, fat, and appears to be lazy." In April 1817 Louis de Aury, a pioneer of the "privateer" settlement at Galveston in Spanish Texas, sold 300 African-born slaves to Erwin, James Still, and Christopher Adams.

=== 1820s ===
In 1822 Erwin, in partnership with brothers George and Robert Bell, bought 93 slaves from Warner Washington II of Virginia, a cousin of George Washington. The US$34,000 (equivalent to $822,375 in 2025) purchase was made with a cash down payment and debt financing of the remainder, due in 1828, 1829, and 1830. The debt was guaranteed by a mortgage on Erwin's Louisiana land, and the mortgage eventually came into the hands of Lawrence Lewis, who later granted the same instrument to his daughter, wife of Andrew Jackson's former ward Edward G. W. Butler, a son of one of the five Fighting Butlers.

In 1823 Erwin took out a mortgage on the Home Plantation. Records of the transaction record the names of 221 people enslaved there "146 were employed on the Front Place and 79 on the so-called Back Place."

In 1824, someone stole another Erwin promissory note, this one being an exchange between Joseph Erwin to John Erwin, in the amount of US$3,250 (equivalent to $95,284 in 2025).

=== Decline and death ===
As early as 1825, family friends began to describe Erwin as "mentally imbalanced, drinking heavily, and in financial distress." Erwin had apparently experienced financial reversals as a result of the Panic of 1819. He borrowed heavily as a result. He also came to suffer some kind of physical debility. Mississippi River flooding of the Home Place and Evergreen Plantations in 1828 resulted in a loss of income. According to Erwin's estate records:

"Desobry, a merchant of Plaquemine, believed that Erwin's embarrassed condition resulted from the great overflow of his plantations in 1828, and further states: 'I called upon Capt. Erwin for the payment of my claim, and found him greatly depressed in mind; he stated to me that he was ruined, and was unable to pay his debts; that I was a poor man and ought not to lose by him; that he would pay me a part cash on my claim, and would give me negroes to pay the balance; that he did not expect to live much longer, and when he died I would lose all."

Erwin committed suicide on April 14, 1829. The total value of his estate was appraised at US$368,000 (equivalent to $11,126,250 in 2025). He freed four slaves in his will: Job Walker, his wife, Esther, and their children, William and Caroline...and bequeathed to Job $1000 in cash and six acres of land on Bayou Grosse Téte." The estate slaves were collectively appraised at $ US$102,000 (equivalent to $3,083,906 in 2025). News of Erwin's suicide was published in a Donaldson, Louisiana newspaper and the story was picked up by the Charleston Daily Courier, which reported that:

"...a more extraordinary case of suicide has rarely come under our notice. In a fit of mental derangement (of which the deceased had of late been subject) as is supposed, he enveloped his head in a blanket, and plunged into a large water jar, head foremost, in which situation he was found lifeless. Capt. Erwin was a wealthy sugar planter...those who have experienced his munificent hospitality, will long deplore the act of infatuation which led to his tragical end."

When Erwin died in 1829, his estate included a "splendid...first rate" 3,000 acres (1,200 ha) sugar and cotton plantation in Iberville Parish, which was to be sold "with or without negroes."

== Lavinia Erwin ==
After Erwin's death, hundreds of slaves, a son-in-law, and his widow Lavinia Erwin ably managed the Home plantation and Irion plantation; "The inventories reveal seventeen skilled laborers among Mrs. Erwin's slaves: Moses, the driver; Bill, the ginner; Caesar, the blacksmith; Pollard and Alfred, carpenters; Bill, the miller; Peter and Moses, coopers; Dick, the cook; William, the coachman; Clem, a bricklayer; Bill, the gamer; John, the drummer; Lem, the sugarmaker; and Suckey, the weaver." Over the course of four days in 1835, a cholera outbreak on the Back Place of Home Plantation killed 28 slaves, and the overseer. Lavinia Erwin died at Plaquemines, Louisiana in 1836. Some of Erwin's descendants remained in their riverfront plantation houses until 1862 "when the Federal army made it intolerable to live there."

== Slave trading ==
Erwin's role in the interstate slave trade is shrouded by the complexity of his business arrangements but there are hints throughout of large transactions such as "Hence, in 1819, Abner Robinson of Baltimore shipped a cargo of ninety-nine slaves to William Kenner and Company, Erwin's factors at New Orleans." His biographer reluctantly conceded the point with the statement:

"However, from the number of individual purchases and sales, Erwin would be classified as an intrastate or small town trader, a career which was facilitated by the constant flow of newcomers to Louisiana. He was in direct touch with the markets of New Orleans, 'the traders' paradise,' and made many of his slave transactions there."

Erwin-as-slave-trader was assisted by Joseph Thompson, a nephew of his wife.

Slave prices were high in the year 1818, and records show Erwin sold US$19,000 (equivalent to $399,620 in 2025) worth of people that year. The highest prices were paid for three prime-age male field hands, Hooper, Sam, and Peter, priced at $1250 each and $1500 respectively, and for "A quadroon, Chloe, aged twelve and warranted a slave for life...sold to Dominie DeVerbois for the price of $1,800."

== Descendants and relatives ==
In 1807, one of Erwin's daughters, Leodocia Erwin, married William Blount Robertson, a son of James Robertson.

Newton Cannon, a nephew of Erwin, was later elected governor of Tennessee. Newton Cannon's mother and Erwin's wife are believed to have both been daughters of Robert Thompson of Guilford County, North Carolina, who was killed at the Battle of Alamance in 1771.

== See also ==
- Natchez, Mississippi slave market
- Andrew Jackson and the slave trade in the United States
- List of slave traders of the United States

== Sources ==
- Carey, Bill (2018). Runaways, Coffles and Fancy Girls: A History of Slavery in Tennessee. Nashville, Tennessee: Clearbrook Press. ISBN 978-0-9725680-4-3. LCCN 2018903570. OCLC 1045068878.
- Cheathem, Mark R. (2014). Andrew Jackson, Southerner. Baton Rouge, Louisiana: Louisiana State University Press. ISBN 978-0-8071-5099-3. LCCN 2012049695. OCLC 858995561. Project MUSE book 26506.
- Clement, W. Edwards (1952). Plantation Life on the Mississippi. In collaboration with Stuart Omer Landry. New Orleans: Pelican Publishing Co. LCCN 52003383. OCLC 2889401. IA plantationlifeon00clem.
- Kelley, Sarah Foster (1987). West Nashville: Its People and Environs. Nashville, Tennessee: Douglas Printing, Inc. ISBN 978-0-9615960-0-2. LCCN 87174035. OCLC 17229742.
- Plater, David D. (2015). The Butlers of Iberville Parish, Louisiana: Dunboyne Plantation in the 1800s. Baton Rouge: Louisiana State University Press. ISBN 978-0-8071-6128-9. LCCN 2015008666. OCLC 921176215. Project MUSE book 48467.
- Robbins, Fred (October 1971). "The Origin and Development of the African Slave Trade in Galveston, Texas, and Surrounding Areas from 1816 to 1836". East Texas Historical Journal. 9 (2). ISSN 0424-1444.
- White, Alice Pemble (April 1944). "The Plantation Experience of Joseph and Lavinia Erwin, 1807–1836". Louisiana Historical Quarterly. XXVII (2). Cabildo, New Orleans: Louisiana Historical Society: 343–477. ISSN 0095-5949 – via Internet Archive.
