= Boyd McNairy =

American physician (1785–1856)

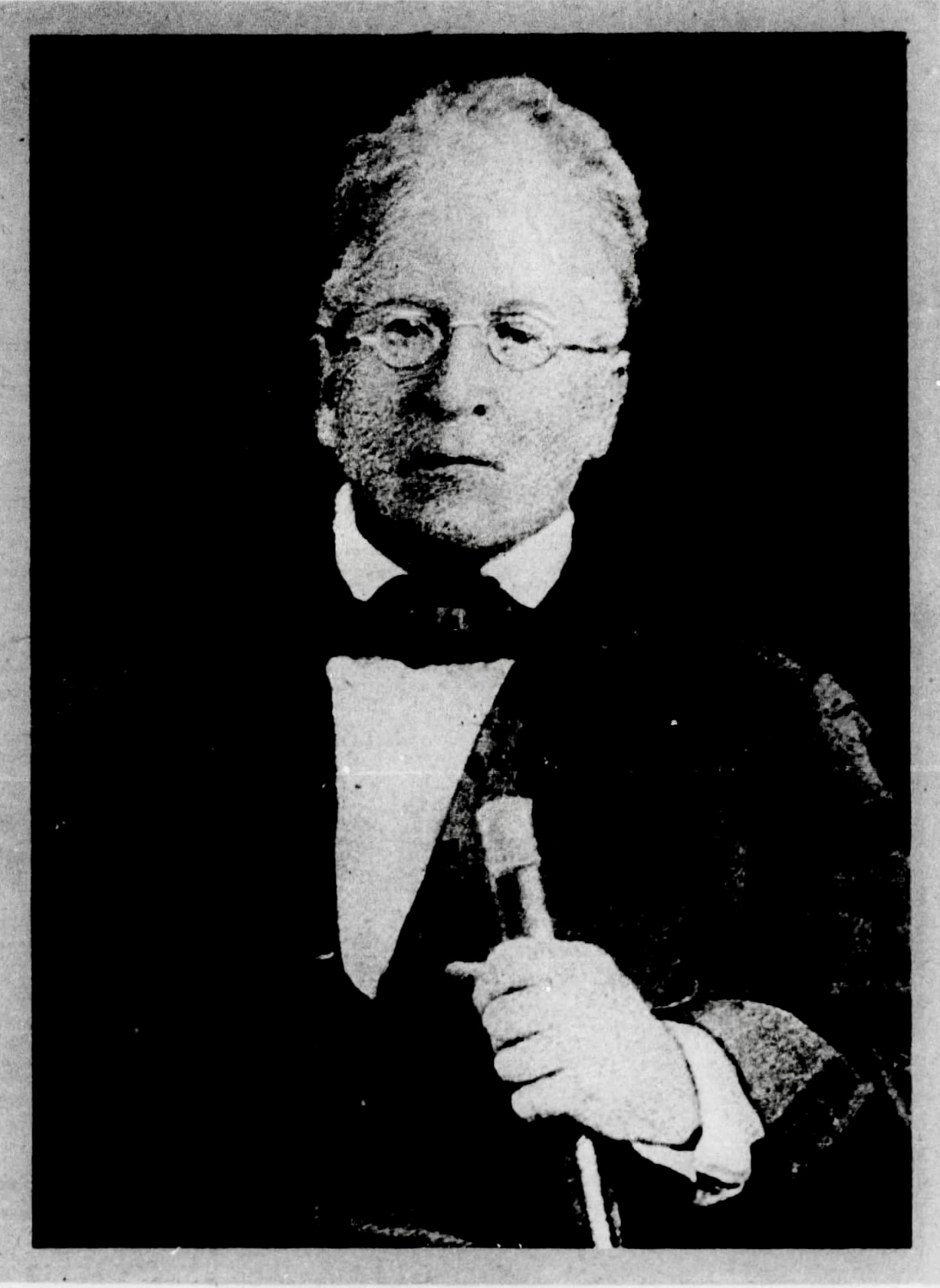
- Born: 1785; North Carolina, U.S.
- Died: November 21, 1856 (aged 70–71); Nashville Tennessee, U.S.
- Occupation: Physician

Dr. Boyd McNairy (1785 – November 21, 1856) was a medical doctor and an influential early settler of Nashville, Tennessee, United States. A member of local medical organizations, McNairy also served as director of the Nashville Lunatic Asylum. He was influential in local politics; although never a candidate himself, he worked to oppose the election of Andrew Jackson to the Presidency and later to promote the nascent Whig Party. The Marquis de Lafayette stayed at McNairy's house when he visited Nashville in 1825. Federal judge John McNairy and lawyer N. A. McNairy were Boyd McNairy's older brothers.

== Career ==
McNairy was born in North Carolina in 1785, and moved to Nashville as a child, departing with his family, "the widow and family of General Davidson," and Andrew Jackson on November 28, 1788. McNairy was 23 years younger than his older brother John McNairy, a United States district court judge. According to one study of Andrew Jackson's apparently disputed birthplace, Boyd McNairy and John McNairy "who came with Jackson from North Carolina" endorsed the belief of U.S. senator Alexander Porter that Jackson had been born in Ireland and immigrated to the American colonies when he was two years old. In 1813, Dr. McNairy treated Jackson for his wounds following a fight involving Thomas Hart Benton.

According to the standard history of Nashville, published in 1890, he "began the practice of his profession here in the early part of 1815. His office at that time was in the brick house formerly owned by Robert Stothart. He graduated in medicine at the University of Pennsylvania, and after beginning the practice of medicine soon acquired an enviable rank for the sterling worth of his professional and manly character. He was distinguished for sound judgment and decision of character." McNairy formed a medical partnership with his neighbor John Shelby in 1817. Sometime maybe in the 1820s the partners promoted a smallpox inoculation program to ward off a feared epidemic. In 1825, during the Marquis de Lafayette's national tour of the United States, the old soldier stayed at McNairy's house while the McNairys stayed with his brother, N. A. McNairy. According to a history of the visit, McNairy's "wife was the daughter of a prosperous Philadelphia trader. The McNairy home was one of the finest brick houses in Nashville and was frequently opened to important visitors...Lafayette slept in a bed which was enclosed by magnificent curtains made of linen woven in Philadelphia in 1776 and brought to Nashville by Mrs. McNairy when she married in 1809. Elaborate designs and pictures com memorating the Revolution were stamped on the linen."

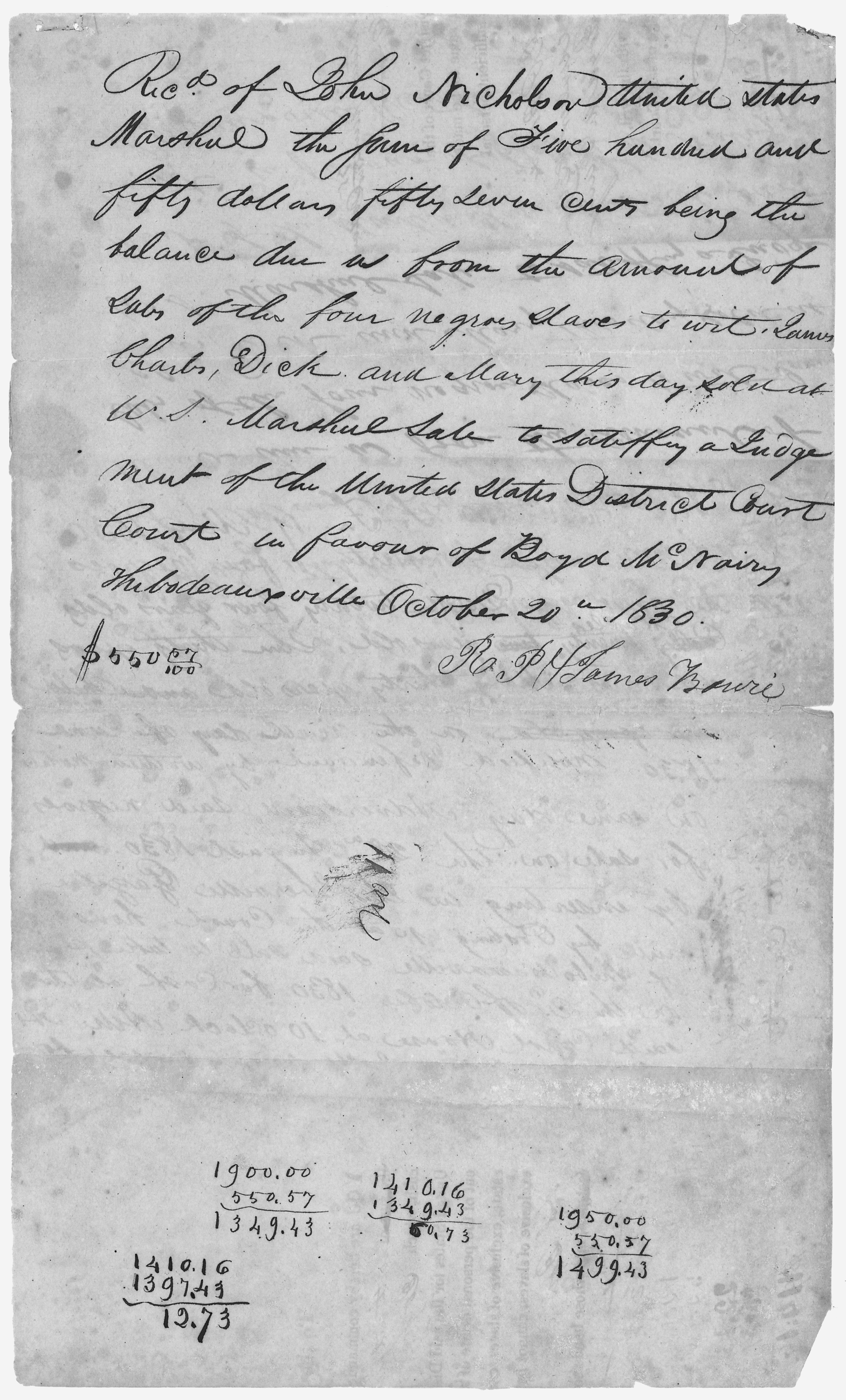
Document filed in case of Boyd McNairy v. James and Rezin Bowie (1830): "Rec'd of John Nicholson United States marshal the sum of Five hundred and fifty dollars fifty seven cents being the balance due us from the amount of sale of the four negroes slaves to wit James [?], Charles, Dick, and Mary, this day sold at U.S. marshal sale to satisfy a judge-ment of the United States District Court in favour of Boyd McNairy Thibodeauxville, October 20th, 1830 R P & James Bowie"

He was one of five commissioners of the Nashville Lunatic Asylum, organized in 1832. McNairy also served as an attending physician at this facility, which was later known as the Old Asylum. When a new facility was built along the Murfreesboro Pike in 1848 under the influence on the legislature of Dorothea Dix, McNairy served as superintendent in 1849.

He died of a "lingering illness" on November 21, 1856. An obituary in the Southern Journal of the Medical and Physical Sciences stated, "He had been engaged actively in the practice of medicine for a half century in the city of Nashville, highly esteemed for his social qualities, his gentlemanly deportment and scientific attainments. As a physician, he was kind, attentive and successful, always observing to maintain the dignity of his calling. His name, in connection with that of two others: yet residing in that city, Drs. Robertson and Waters, is associated with our earliest recollections of physic."

== Politics ==
According to historian Thomas Abernethy, there were a number of Tennesseans "who would not bend the knee" to Andrew Jackson, including John Williams, Jesse Benton, James Jackson, Wilkins Tannehill, Newton Cannon, and Boyd McNairy. Another account described McNairy as a "bitter foe" of Jackson. Indices of early printing in Tennessee credit McNairy with two publications created for the 1828 U.S. presidential election cycle; both documents attack the character of Andrew Jackson.

- McMurtrie 270: Jackson a Negro Trader. From the Nashville Banner and Whig. To the Public. [At end]: Boyd McNairy. 14 July 1828. 27.5 x 45 cm. Broadside.
- McMurtrie 273: Dr. M'Nairy's Circular | To the Citizens of the Seventh Electoral District, in the State of Tennessee, composed of the Counties of Rutherford, Davidson, and Williamson: [Nashville, 1828.] 34 x 53.5 cm. Broadside. Text in 5 columns.

McNairy ran against Jackson supporter William Sublett of Rutherford County for presidential elector from the seventh district of Tennessee in 1828.

In 1831 he was the only representative from Tennessee at convention of the National Republican Party, nominating Henry Clay for president. In company with John Bell, he led Nashville's support for "Tippacanoe and Tyler Too!" during the 1840 presidential election cycle, and Henry Clay stayed at McNairy's house during a political convention that year. In 1848 McNairy was among the leaders of what "John Bell referred to as the 'Clay and Confusion movement'" again backing Henry Clay.

== Personal life ==
He married Anne Marie Hodgkinson of Philadelphia, daughter of a merchant ship owner, in 1809. Their daughter Carolyn McNairy left a description of the McNairy house and Jackson's rehabilitation there after the 1813 tavern brawl. One of their children, John Sims McNairy, was also a medical doctor in adulthood.

== See also ==
- Andrew Jackson and the slave trade in the United States
- Visit of the Marquis de Lafayette to the United States
- History of the Whig Party (United States)
