= John McNairy =

American judge (1762–1837)

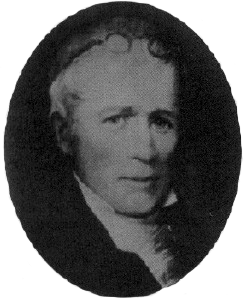

Judge of the United States District Court for the Eastern District of Tennessee Judge of the United States District Court for the Western District of Tennessee
- In office April 29, 1802 – September 1, 1833
- Appointed by: operation of law
- Preceded by: Seat established by 2 Stat.165
- Succeeded by: Morgan Welles Brown

Judge of the United States District Court for the District of Tennessee
- In office February 20, 1797 – April 29, 1802
- Appointed by: George Washington
- Preceded by: Seat established by 1 Stat. 496
- Succeeded by: Seat abolished

Personal details
- Born: John McNairy; March 30, 1762 Lancaster County, Province of Pennsylvania, British America
- Died: November 12, 1837 (aged 75) Nashville, Tennessee
- Relations: N. A. McNairy, Boyd McNairy (brothers)
- Education: read law

John McNairy (March 30, 1762 – November 12, 1837) was a U.S. federal judge in Tennessee. He was the judge for the Southwest Territory, and for the United States District Court for the District of Tennessee, the United States District Court for the Eastern District of Tennessee and the United States District Court for the Western District of Tennessee, back when one judge covered all three districts. McNairy and Andrew Jackson went to school together and read law together, and travelled together to the Mero District of North Carolina in the late 1780s to set up the federal judiciary in what is now Tennessee. George Washington appointed McNairy to be judge, and McNairy appointed Jackson to a position roughly equivalent to U.S. Attorney.

== Education and career ==
McNairy was born on March 30, 1762, in Lancaster County, Province of Pennsylvania, British America. Other sources state that he was born near Horsepen Creek in the vicinity of the now extinct settlement of Martinsville, North Carolina. His parents, Francis McNairy and Mary Boyd, had moved to the area shortly after their April 1761 marriage in Pennsylvania. Part of the American Revolutionary War Battle of Guilford Courthouse took place on the McNairy property, and the family house sheltered injured soldiers after the fight. There is no surviving record of McNairy's participation in the war other than a payment record from North Carolina.

McNairy was educated under the oversight of local Presbyterian minister David Caldwell. He likely studied law with neighbor and Founding Father Alexander Martin. McNairy was licensed to practice in Guilford County in 1783, and then in 1784 moved to Salisbury, North Carolina where was worked with Spruce MacKay and met young Andrew Jackson. Jackson and McNairy lived together "at the McNairy home" and worked locally as lawyers during the winter of 1787–88.

In December 1787, North Carolina appointed McNairy to be the judge of the forthcoming Mero District. McNairy entered private practice in Jonesboro, North Carolina (unorganized territory from April 2, 1790, Southwest Territory from May 26, 1790) starting in 1788. He was a Judge of the Superior Court of Law and Equity, Mero District, starting in 1788. (Note: The Superior Court was established by the State of North Carolina in 1788 to serve the residents of what would become Tennessee and continued to exist during the territorial period and after Tennessee gained statehood, but was abolished by Tennessee in 1809.)

He was nominated to the Territorial Court for the Southwest Territory by President Washington on June 7, 1790, and was confirmed by the United States Senate on June 8, 1790, serving in that post until his appointment to the District of Tennessee.

McNairy was a delegate to the 1796 Tennessee Constitutional Convention in Knoxville and contributed to drafting the state constitution.

== Federal judicial service ==
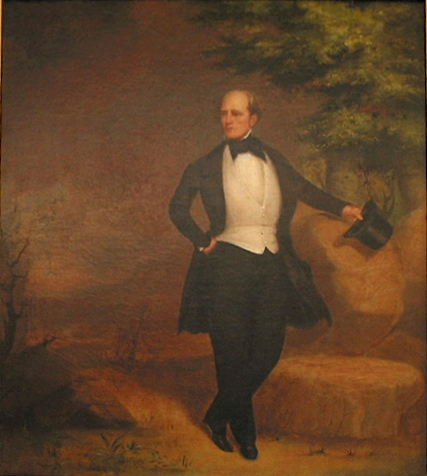
Portrait of McNairy by unknown artist, early 1800s.

Following the admission of the Southwest Territory to the Union as the State of Tennessee on June 1, 1796, McNairy was nominated by President George Washington on February 17, 1797, to the United States District Court for the District of Tennessee, to a new seat authorized by 1 Stat. 496. He was confirmed by the United States Senate on February 20, 1797, and received his commission the same day. The annual salary for the position was US$800 (equivalent to $14,978 in 2025).

McNairy was reassigned by operation of law to the United States District Court for the Eastern District of Tennessee and the United States District Court for the Western District of Tennessee on April 29, 1802, to a new joint seat authorized by 2 Stat. 165. His service terminated on September 1, 1833, due to his resignation.

The Judiciary Act of 1801 abolished the United States District Court for the District of Tennessee on February 13, 1801, and assigned McNairy to serve as a district judge on the United States Circuit Court for the Sixth Circuit. The Act was repealed on March 8, 1802, reestablishing the district court as of July 1, 1802.

McNairy resigned from the bench in 1834.

== Death and legacy ==
McNairy died on November 12, 1837, near Nashville, Tennessee. McNairy County, Tennessee, is named in McNairy's honor.

== Slavery ==
McNairy placed a runaway slave ad in 1801 offering a $5 reward for the return of an enslaved man named Ned, who "plays well on the Violin."

== Personal life ==
McNairy got married in either 1788 or 1789 to Mary Bell Hunt (or Hunter) Robertson, who had been married twice before and widowed twice before "by Indian raids." Mary Bell's husband, Mark Robertson, brother of James Robertson, was killed March 1786 in the vicinity of Nashville "by the Indians." She had two brothers who were members of the Nashville Masonic Lodge, "George and Robert Bell (brothers) were gentlemen of means and leisure, and were 'fighting friends' of General Jackson. They owned Capitol Hill, which they sold to George W. Campbell, with three or four acres adjoining, for six thousand dollars. They delighted in horse-racing, but were the very 'soul of honor'.” Judge McNairy married a sister of these gentlemen." They had no children together.

McNairy had several siblings who survived to adulthood:

- Margaret McNairy m. Thomas Hamilton
- Catherine McNairy m. Jason Thompson; Jason's sister Lavinia Thompson McKemey was married to another early affiliate of Andrew Jackson, Capt. Joseph Erwin
- Mary McNairy m. Elisha Nicholson
- James McNairy stayed in Guilford County and worked as a lawyer
- Robert McNairy moved to Giles County, Tennessee
- Nathaniel McNairy, lawyer
- Andrew McNairy, lawyer
- Boyd McNairy, physician

== McNairy and Andrew Jackson ==
In January 1805 he was a signatory to a petition protesting the court-martial of Thomas Butler, probably produced at the behest of Andrew Jackson and sent to Thomas Jefferson's government, recorded in official state papers under the title "Disobedience of Orders Justified on the Grounds of Illegality."

According to Judge John W. Green, writing in 1943, "Later on Andrew Jackson, who had been appointed Attorney-General for the district, fell out with McNairy over the removal of Col. James Robertson as agent of the Chickasaw Indians. McNairy favored his removal and Jackson opposed it. Jackson became so enraged at the attitude of his former friend and fellow student and used such 'unparliamentary language' in regard to him that a breach occurred that time never healed." They apparently had other conflicts over the years but McNairy "endorsed his initial, unsuccessful presidential bid in 1824 and served on a committee of Nashvillians who supported Jackson's second, successful race for the presidency in 1828."

== See also ==
- List of United States federal judges by longevity of service

== Sources ==
- Carey, Bill (2018). Runaways, Coffles and Fancy Girls: A History of Slavery in Tennessee. Nashville, Tennessee: Clearbrook Press. ISBN 978-0-9725680-4-3. LCCN 2018903570. OCLC 1045068878.
- John McNairy at the Biographical Directory of Federal Judges, a publication of the Federal Judicial Center.
- Green, John W. (1943). "Six Judges of the United States District Court for Tennessee (1797–1908)". Tennessee Law Review. 17 (8.1). Knoxville, Tennessee: University of Tennessee Law School: 889–898.
- Hoskins, Mary Katherine (1991). "John McNairy". In Powell, William S. (ed.). Dictionary of North Carolina Biography. Vol. 4: L–O. Chapel Hill: University of North Carolina Press. pp. 178–179. ISBN 978-0-8078-1918-0. LCCN 79010106.
- Kelley, Sarah Foster (1987). West Nashville: Its People and Environs. Nashville, Tennessee: Douglas Printing, Inc. ISBN 978-0-9615960-0-2. LCCN 87174035. OCLC 17229742.
- Nelson, Anson (Summer 2015). "Distinguished Nashville Masons of 1818 [orig. pub. 1869]" (PDF). Middle Tennessee Journal of Genealogy & History. XXIX (1): 30–33.

Legal offices
Preceded by Seat established by 1 Stat. 496	Judge of the United States District Court for the District of Tennessee; 1797–1802	Succeeded by Seat abolished
Preceded by Seat established by 2 Stat. 165	Judge of the United States District Court for the Eastern District of Tennessee; Judge of the United States District Court for the Western District of Tennessee; 1802–1833	Succeeded by Morgan Welles Brown
