= History of the Whig Party (United States) =

Aspect of U.S. political history

The history of the United States Whig Party lasted from its establishment early in President Andrew Jackson's second term (1833–1837) to the collapse of the party during the term of President Franklin Pierce (1853–1857). This article covers the party in national politics.

The Whigs emerged in the 1830s in opposition to President Andrew Jackson, pulling together former members of the National Republican Party, the Anti-Masonic Party, and disaffected Democrats. The Whigs had some links to the defunct Federalist Party, but the Whig Party was not a direct successor to that party and many Whig leaders, including Clay, had previously aligned with the Democratic-Republican Party rather than the Federalist Party. In the 1836 presidential election, four different Whig candidates received electoral votes, but the party failed to defeat Jackson's chosen successor, Martin Van Buren. Whig nominee William Henry Harrison unseated Van Buren in the 1840 presidential election, but died just one month into his term. Harrison's successor, John Tyler, broke with the Whigs in 1841 after clashing with Clay and other Whig Party leaders over economic policies such as the re-establishment of a national bank.

Clay won his party's nomination in the 1844 presidential election but was eventually defeated by Democrat James K. Polk, who subsequently presided over the Mexican–American War. Whig nominee Zachary Taylor won the 1848 presidential election, but Taylor died in 1850 and was succeeded by Millard Fillmore. Fillmore, Clay, Daniel Webster, and Democrat Stephen A. Douglas led the passage of the Compromise of 1850, which helped to defuse sectional tensions in the aftermath of the Mexican–American War. Nonetheless, sectional divisions contributed to a decisive Whig defeat in the 1852 presidential election. The Whigs collapsed following the passage of the Kansas–Nebraska Act in 1854, with most Northern Whigs eventually joining the anti-slavery Republican Party and most Southern Whigs joining the nativist American Party and later the Constitutional Union Party.

== Background ==
=== End of the First Party System ===
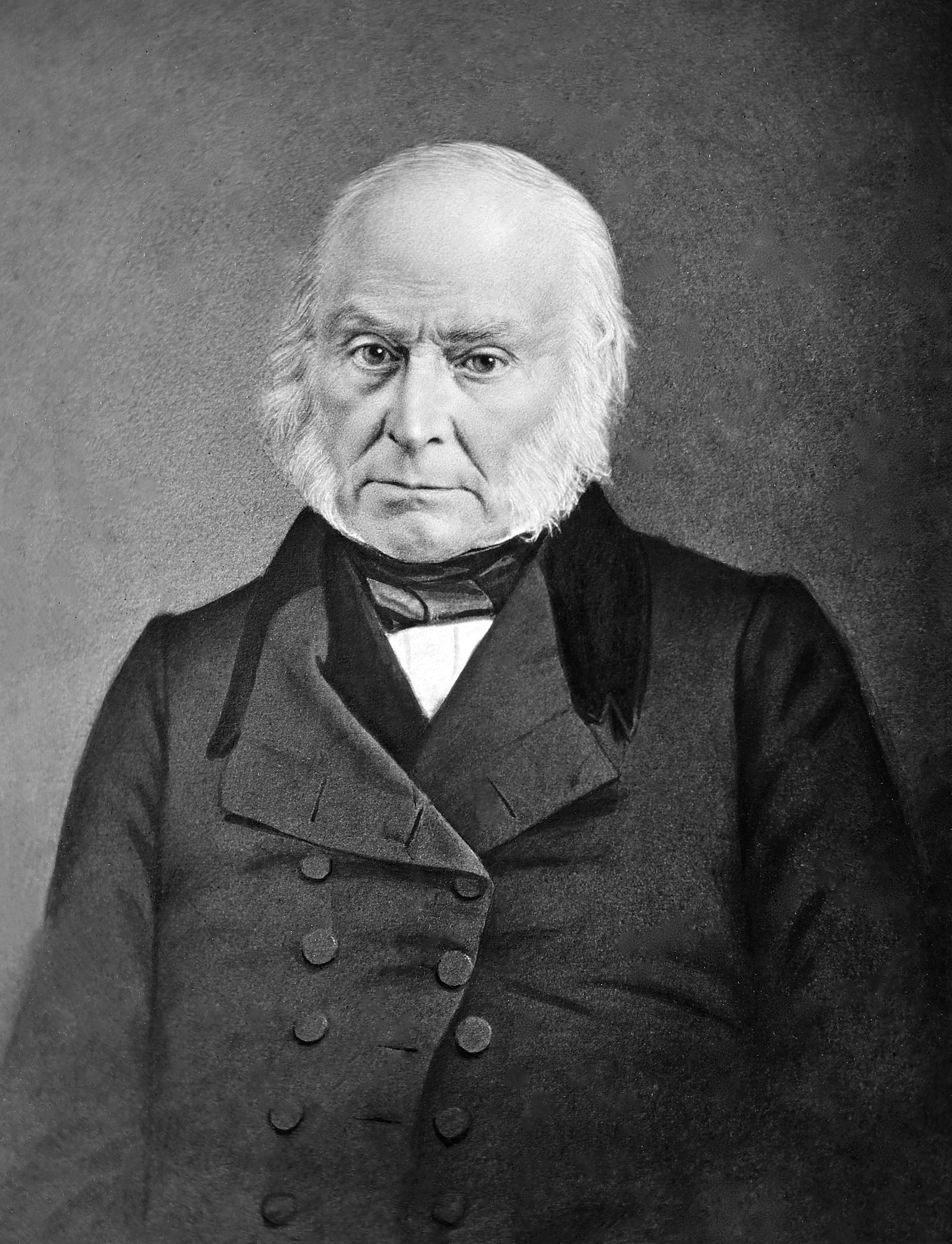
John Quincy Adams, the 6th president, became a Whig congressman later in his career

During the 1790s, the first major U.S. parties arose in the form of the Federalist Party, led by Alexander Hamilton, and the Democratic-Republican Party, led by Thomas Jefferson. Federalist strength declined after the 1800 presidential election and especially after the War of 1812, leaving the Democratic-Republicans as the sole major party. After 1815, the Democratic-Republicans became increasingly polarized. A nationalist wing, led by Henry Clay, favored policies such as the Second Bank of the United States, the implementation of a protective tariff. A second group, the Old Republicans, opposed these policies, instead favoring a strict interpretation of the United States Constitution and a weak federal government.

In the 1824 presidential election, the Democratic-Republican congressional nominating caucus nominated Secretary of the Treasury William H. Crawford for president, but Clay, Secretary of State John Quincy Adams, Secretary of War John C. Calhoun, and General Andrew Jackson all ignored the results of the caucus and sought the presidency. Crawford favored state sovereignty and a strict constructionist view of the Constitution, while Calhoun (who ultimately dropped out of the race), Clay, and Adams all favored high tariffs and the national bank. While the other candidates based their candidacies on their long tenure as congressmen, ambassadors, or members of the Cabinet, Jackson's appeal rested on his military service, especially in the Battle of New Orleans. Jackson won a plurality of the popular and electoral vote in the 1824 election, but, with Clay's support, Adams was elected as president in a contingent election held in the House of Representatives.

=== National Republicans ===
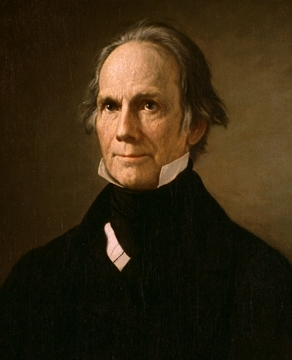
Henry Clay, a founder of the Whig Party who served as the 1844 Whig presidential nominee

In the years following the 1824 election, the Democratic-Republican Party split into two groups. Supporters of President Adams and Clay joined with many former Federalists such as Daniel Webster to form a group informally known as the "Adams party". Meanwhile, supporters of Jackson, Calhoun, (Note: Despite his previous nationalist stances and friendship with Adams, Calhoun became an increasingly ardent advocate of the doctrine of states' rights during the 1820s.) and Crawford joined to oppose the Adams administration's nationalist agenda, becoming informally known as "Jacksonians". Outside of New England, many of the Adams administration's allies defined themselves more in their opposition to Jackson than in their support of Adams. Due in part to the superior organization and unity of his fledgling party, Jackson defeated President Adams in the 1828 presidential election, taking 56 percent of the popular vote. With the defeat of Adams, Clay emerged as the leader of the National Republican Party, a political party opposed to Jackson; followers of Jackson, meanwhile, organized into the Democratic Party.

Despite Jackson's decisive victory in the 1828 election, National Republicans initially believed that Jackson's party would collapse once Jackson took office. Vice President Calhoun resigned from the administration in 1832, but differences over the tariff prevented his followers from joining the National Republicans. Other actions of the administration, including a policy of Indian removal, the Maysville Road veto, and acceptance of tariffs and some federally-funded infrastructure projects, solidified Jackson's popularity. Meanwhile, the Anti-Masonic Party formed following the disappearance and possible murder of William Morgan in 1826. Clay rejected overtures from the Anti-Masonic Party, and his attempt to convince Calhoun to serve as his running mate failed, leaving the opposition to Jackson split among different leaders when the National Republicans nominated Clay for president.

Hoping to make the national bank a key issue of the 1832 election, the National Republicans convinced national bank president Nicholas Biddle to request an extension of the national bank's charter, but their strategy backfired when Jackson successfully portrayed his veto of the recharter as a victory for the people against an elitist institution. Jackson won another decisive victory in the 1832 presidential election, taking 55 percent of the national popular vote and 88 percent of the popular vote in the slave states south of Kentucky and Maryland. Clay's defeat discredited the National Republican Party, encouraging those opposed to Jackson to seek to create a more effective opposition party.

== Creation, 1833–1836 ==
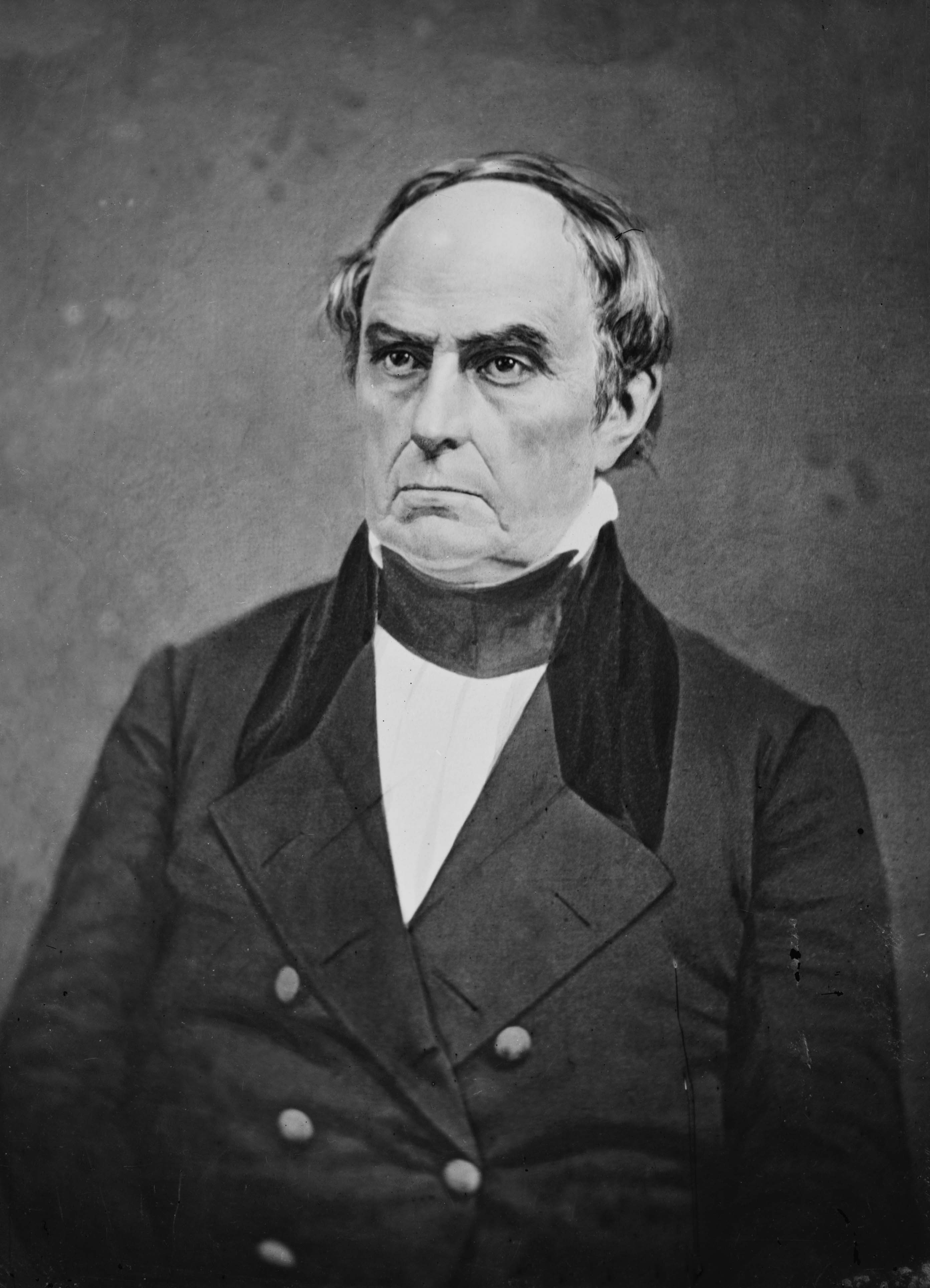
Daniel Webster, a leading Whig from New England

Shortly after Jackson's re-election, South Carolina passed a measure to "nullify" the Tariff of 1832, beginning the Nullification Crisis. Jackson strongly denied the right of South Carolina to nullify federal law, but the crisis was resolved after Congress passed the Tariff of 1833. The Nullification Crisis briefly scrambled the partisan divisions that had emerged after 1824, as many within the Jacksonian coalition opposed President Jackson's threats of force against South Carolina, while some opposition leaders like Daniel Webster supported them. In South Carolina and other states, those opposed to Jackson began to form small "Whig" parties. The Whig label implicitly compared "King Andrew" to King George III, the King of Great Britain at the time of the American Revolution.

Jackson's decision to remove government deposits from the national bank (Note: Though Jackson had vetoed a re-charter bill, the bank still retained federal deposits at the start of his second term. The national bank's federal charter expired in 1836.) ended any possibility of a Webster-Jackson alliance and helped to solidify partisan lines. The removal of the deposits drew opposition from both pro-bank National Republicans and states' rights Southerners like Willie Person Mangum of North Carolina, the latter of whom accused Jackson of flouting the Constitution. In late 1833, Clay began to hold a series of dinners with opposition leaders in order to settle on a candidate to oppose Martin Van Buren, the likely Democratic nominee in the 1836 presidential election. While Jackson's opponents could not agree on a single presidential candidate, they coordinated in the Senate to oppose Jackson's initiatives. Historian Michael Holt writes that the "birth of the Whig Party" can be dated to Clay and his allies taking control of the Senate in December 1833.

The National Republicans, including Clay and Webster, formed the core of the Whig Party, but many Anti-Masons like William H. Seward of New York and Thaddeus Stevens of Pennsylvania also joined. Several prominent Democrats defected to the Whigs, including Mangum, former Attorney General John Berrien, and John Tyler of Virginia. The Whig Party's first major action was to censure Jackson for the removal of the national bank deposits, thereby establishing opposition to Jackson's executive power as the organizing principle of the new party. In doing so, the Whigs were able to shed the elitist image that had persistently hindered the National Republicans. Throughout 1834 and 1835, the Whigs successfully incorporated National Republican and Anti-Masonic state-level organizations and established new state party organizations in Southern states like North Carolina and Georgia.

== Rise, 1836–1841 ==
=== Van Buren and the election of 1836 ===
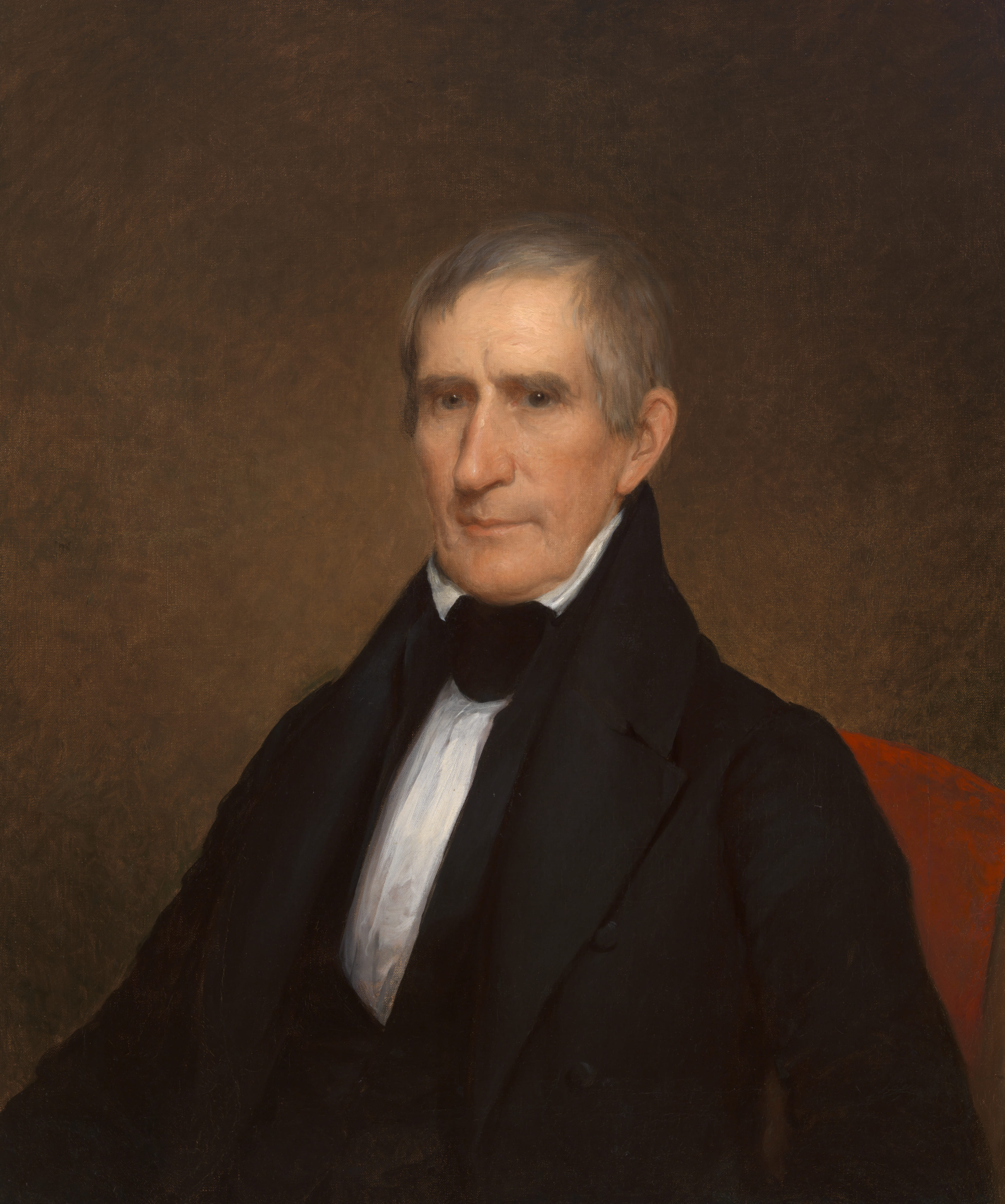
William Henry Harrison, a two-time presidential candidate who became the first Whig president in 1841 but died just one month into office

Early successes in various states made many Whigs optimistic about victory in 1836, but an improving economy bolstered Van Buren's standing ahead of the election. The Whigs also faced the difficulty of uniting former National Republicans, Anti-Masons, and states' rights Southerners around one candidate, and the party suffered an early blow when Calhoun announced that he would refuse to support any candidate opposed to the doctrine of nullification. As party leaders were unable to organize a presidential nominating convention, legislative caucuses in the states instead nominated candidates, resulting in the nomination of multiple Whig candidates for president. The presence of multiple Whig presidential candidates in the 1836 election was a reflection of a divided party rather than the result of a concerted strategy by party leaders, though some Whigs did express hope that nominating multiple candidates would force a contingent election in the House of Representatives by denying Van Buren a majority of the electoral vote.

Northern Whigs cast aside both Clay and Webster in favor of General William Henry Harrison, a former senator who had led U.S. forces in the 1811 Battle of Tippecanoe. Though he had not previously been affiliated with the National Republicans, Harrison indicated that he shared the party's concerns over Jackson's executive power and favored federal investments in infrastructure. Though he was eclipsed by Harrison, Webster remained in the race, but only as the Whig candidate in his home state of Massachusetts. Southern Whigs coalesced around Senator Hugh Lawson White, a long-time Jackson ally who opposed Van Buren's candidacy. Capitalizing on opposition to Van Buren and the growing prominence of the abolitionist movement, White and his followers helped establish and grow Whig party organizations throughout the South. Ultimately, Van Buren won a majority of the electoral and popular vote in the 1836 election, though the Whigs improved on Clay's 1832 performance in the South and West. Harrison won Kentucky and several Northern states, White carried Tennessee and Georgia, Webster won his home state, and Willie Mangum won South Carolina's eleven electoral votes.

Shortly after Van Buren took office, an economic crisis known as the Panic of 1837 struck the nation. Land prices plummeted, industries laid off employees, and banks failed. According to historian Daniel Walker Howe, the economic crisis of the late 1830s and early 1840s was the most severe recession in U.S. history until the Great Depression. Van Buren's economic response centered on establishing the Independent Treasury system, essentially a series of vaults that would hold government deposits. As the debate over the Independent Treasury continued, William Cabell Rives and some other Democrats who favored a more activist government defected to the Whig Party, while Calhoun and his followers joined the Democratic Party. The Whigs experienced a series of electoral successes in 1837 and 1838, sparking hopes that the party could win the upcoming 1840 presidential election. Whig leaders agreed to hold the party's first national convention in December 1839 in order to select the Whig presidential nominee.

=== Election of 1840 ===
William Henry Harrison defeated Martin Van Buren in the 1840 presidential election, thereby becoming the first Whig president

By early 1838, Clay had emerged as the front-runner due to his support in the South and his spirited opposition to Van Buren's Independent Treasury. However, a recovering economy convinced other Whigs to support Harrison, who was generally seen as the Whig candidate best able to win over Democrats and new voters. Another candidate emerged in the form of General Winfield Scott, who earned acclaim for avoiding tensions with Britain during the Rebellions of 1837–1838 in Canada. Clay led on the first ballot of the 1839 Whig National Convention, but, with the crucial support of Thaddeus Stevens of Pennsylvania and Thurlow Weed of New York, Harrison won the Whig nomination on the fifth ballot. For vice president, the Whigs nominated John Tyler, a former states' rights Democrat chosen to be on the ticket primarily because other Southern supporters of Clay refused to serve as Harrison's running mate.

Log cabins and hard cider became the dominant symbols of the Whig campaign as the party sought to portray Harrison as a man of the people. The Whigs also assailed Van Buren's handling of the economy and argued that traditional Whig policies such as the restoration of a national bank and the implementation of protective tariff rates would help to restore the economy. Harrison himself avoided taking strong stances on issues like the national bank, but he pledged to serve only a single term, promised to defer to Congress on most matters of policy, and attacked Van Buren's alleged executive tyranny. With the economy still in a downturn, Harrison decisively defeated Van Buren, taking a wide majority of the electoral vote and just under 53 percent of the popular vote. Voter turnout jumped from 57.8 percent in 1836 to 80.2 percent in 1840, with Whigs capturing a decisive majority of these new voters. In concurrent elections, the Whigs took control of Congress.

== Harrison and Tyler, 1841–1845 ==
=== Tyler administration ===
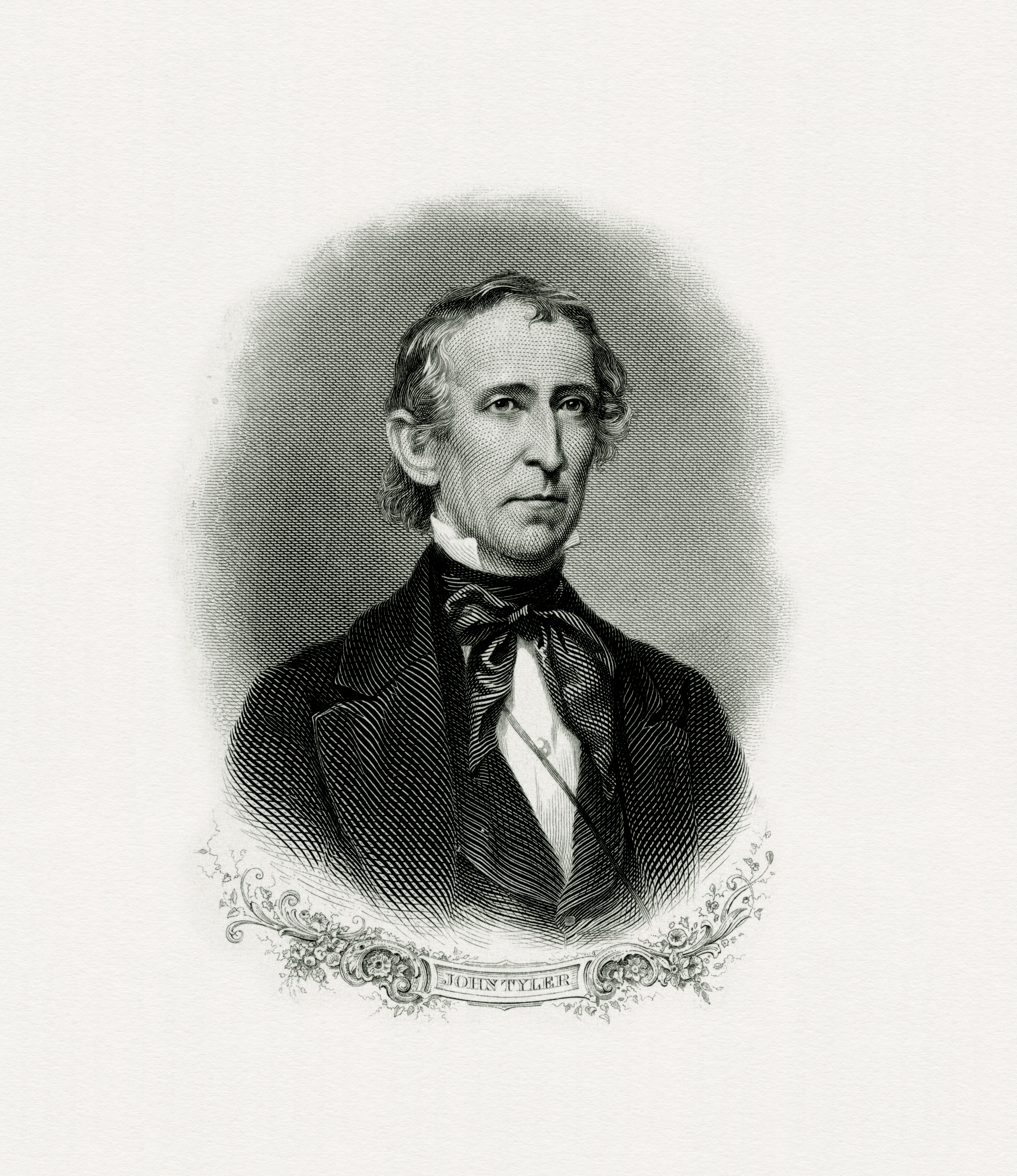
President John Tyler clashed with congressional Whigs and was expelled from the party.

With the election of the first Whig presidential administration in the party's history, Clay and his allies prepared to pass ambitious domestic policies such as the restoration of the national bank, the distribution of federal land sales revenue to the states, a national bankruptcy law, and increased tariff rates. Harrison took office in 1841 and appointed Webster as Secretary of State; Clay chose to remain in the Senate, but Clay allies John J. Crittenden, Thomas Ewing, and John Bell all joined Harrison's Cabinet. Harrison died just one month into his term, thereby elevating Vice President Tyler to the presidency. Tyler supported some parts of the Whig legislative program, including the repeal of Van Buren's Independent Treasury system and the passage of the Preemption Act of 1841, which was the first law in U.S. history that allowed for voluntary bankruptcy. Despite those points of agreement, Tyler had never accepted much of the Whig economic program and he soon clashed with Clay and other congressional Whigs.

Following the repeal of the Independent Treasury, the Whigs turned their attention to the creation of a new national bank. Tyler vetoed Clay's national bank bill in August 1841, holding that the bill was unconstitutional. Congress passed a second bill based on an earlier proposal made by Treasury Secretary Ewing that was tailored to address Tyler's constitutional concerns, but Tyler vetoed that bill as well. In response, every Cabinet member but Webster resigned, and the Whig congressional caucus expelled Tyler from the party on September 13, 1841. Tyler quickly assembled a new Cabinet consisting of states' rights and anti-Clay Whigs, purged allies of Clay from federal positions, and began a campaign to win over various Whig leaders, including journalists Thurlow Weed and Horace Greeley.

Due to the ongoing economic troubles of the Panic of 1837, as well as the relatively low tariff rates set by the Tariff of 1833, the government faced a growing budget deficit. Whigs in Congress, led by the House Ways and Means Chairman Millard Fillmore, passed in each house a bill restoring tariffs to the levels set by the Tariff of 1832. Tyler signed the Tariff of 1842 on August 30, 1842, but vetoed a separate bill to restore the policy of distributing federal land sales revenue to the states. Shortly afterwards, the Whigs began impeachment proceedings against Tyler, but they ultimately declined to impeach him because they believed that his likely acquittal would devastate the party. The Whigs lost numerous races in the 1842 mid-term elections, as the country continued to suffer from the effects of the Panic of 1837. The Whigs had promised "relief and reform," and voters punished the party for the lack of change. According to historian Michael C. Holt, the failure of the Whigs to enact their policies after their sweeping victories in the 1840 elections permanently damaged the party's credibility and discouraged Whig voters from turning out for elections in the 1840s and 1850s. Discontent with the Whig Party also helped fuel the rise of the Liberty Party, an abolitionist third party consisting largely of former Whigs.

=== Election of 1844 ===
Whig nominee Henry Clay was defeated by Democrat James K. Polk in the 1844 presidential election

Beginning in mid-1842, Tyler increasingly began to court Democrats, appointing them to his Cabinet and other positions. At the same time, many Whig state organizations repudiated the Tyler administration and endorsed Clay as the party's candidate in the 1844 presidential election. After Webster resigned from the Cabinet in May 1843 following the conclusion of the Webster–Ashburton Treaty, Tyler made the annexation of Texas his key priority. The annexation of Texas was widely viewed as a pro-slavery initiative as it would add another slave state to the union, and most leaders of both parties opposed opening the question of annexation in 1843 due to the fear of stoking the debate over slavery. Tyler was nonetheless determined to pursue annexation because he believed that the British conspired to abolish slavery in Texas (Note: In actuality, the government of British Prime Minister Robert Peel had little interest in pushing abolitionism in Texas.) and because he saw the issue as a means to reelection, either through the Democratic Party or through a new party. In April 1844, Secretary of State John C. Calhoun reached a treaty with Texas providing for the annexation of that country.

Clay and Van Buren, the two front-runners for major party presidential nominations in the 1844 election, both announced their opposition to annexation, and the Senate blocked the annexation treaty. To the surprise of Clay and other Whigs, the 1844 Democratic National Convention rejected Van Buren in favor of James K. Polk and established a platform calling for the acquisition of both Texas and Oregon Country. A protege of Andrew Jackson, Polk had hoped to win the vice presidential nomination prior to the convention, but Democratic delegates instead made Polk the first "dark horse" presidential nominee in U.S. history. Having won the presidential nomination at the 1844 Whig National Convention unopposed, Clay and other Whigs were initially confident that they would defeat the divided Democrats and their relatively obscure candidate. However, Democratic leaders were able to convince all three of Van Buren, Calhoun, and Tyler to support Polk, bolstering the Democratic campaign. Ultimately, Polk won the election, taking 49.5 of the popular vote and a majority of the electoral vote; the swing of just over one percent of the vote in New York would have given Clay the victory. Southern voters responded to Polk's calls for annexation, while in the North, Democrats benefited from the growing animosity towards the Whig Party among Catholic and foreign-born voters. Though Clay distanced himself from this nativist approach during the campaign, his running mate, Theodore Frelinghuysen, was publicly associated with this nativist and anti-Catholic rhetoric.

== Polk and the Mexican–American War, 1845–1849 ==
=== Polk administration ===
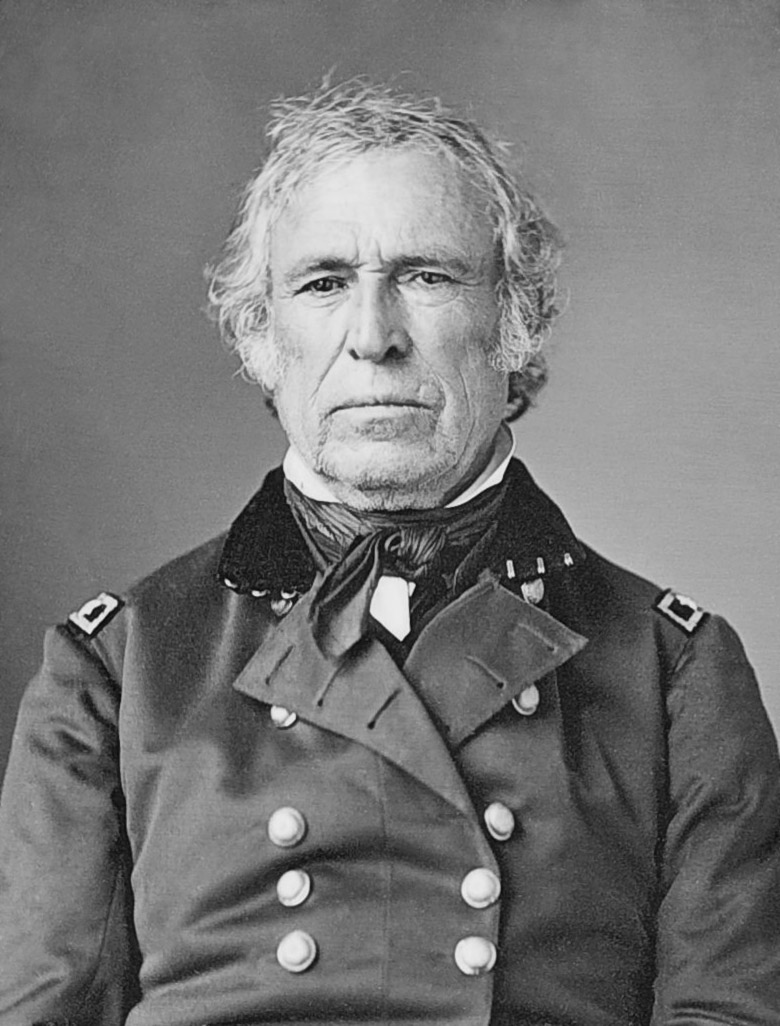
Zachary Taylor served in the Mexican–American War and later won the 1848 presidential election as the Whig nominee

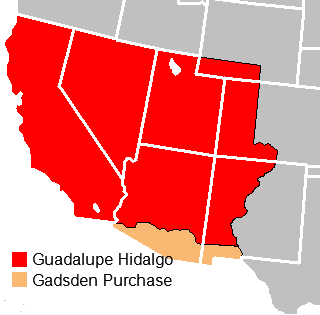
The United States settled the Texas-Mexico border and acquired portions of seven current states in the Treaty of Guadalupe Hidalgo. Portions of present-day Arizona and New Mexico were later acquired in the 1853 Gadsden Purchase.

In the final weeks of Tyler's presidency, a small group of Southern Whigs joined with congressional Democrats to pass a joint resolution providing for the annexation of Texas. Texas subsequently became a state in 1845. Following the annexation of Texas, Polk began preparations for a potential war with Mexico, which still regarded Texas as a part of its republic and contended that Texas's true southern border was the Nueces River rather than the Rio Grande River. In April, a skirmish known as the Thornton Affair broke out on the northern side of the Rio Grande River, ending in the death or capture of dozens of American soldiers. In a subsequent message to Congress asking for a declaration of war, Polk explained his decision to send Taylor to the Rio Grande, and argued that Mexico had invaded American territory by crossing the Rio Grande River. Many Whigs argued that Polk had provoked war with Mexico by sending Taylor to the Rio Grande, but most Whigs feared that opposing the war would be politically unpopular, so only a minority of Whigs voted against the declaration of war. As the war continued, most Whigs continually praised the soldiers fighting the war and approved military appropriations bills, but at the same time attacked Polk's handling of the war as both incompetent and tyrannical.

Taylor won a series of battles against Mexican forces in Northern Mexico, but victories in that theater failed to convince the Mexican government to agree to the territorial concessions sought by Polk. While the war in Mexico continued, Polk submitted a treaty providing for the partition of Oregon Country with Britain; the Senate ratified the Oregon Treaty in a 41–14 vote, with opposition coming from those who sought the full territory. Polk also pushed through the restoration of the Independent Treasury System and a bill that reduced tariffs; opposition to the passage of these Democratic policies helped to reunify and reinvigorate the Whigs. The Whigs won numerous congressional, gubernatorial, and state legislative seats in the 1846 elections, boosting the party's hopes of winning the presidency in 1848.

In August 1846, Polk asked Congress to appropriate $2 million in hopes of using that money as a down payment for the purchase of California in a treaty with Mexico. Polk's request ignited opposition to the war, as Polk had never before made public his desire to annex parts of Mexico, aside from lands claimed by Texas. Representative David Wilmot (D-Pennsylvania) offered an amendment known as the Wilmot Proviso, which would ban slavery in any newly acquired lands. The Wilmot Proviso passed the House with the support of Northern Whigs and Northern Democrats, breaking the normal pattern of partisan division in congressional votes, but it was defeated in the Senate. Nonetheless, clear divisions remained between the two parties on territorial acquisitions. Most Democrats joined Polk in seeking to acquire vast tracts of land from Mexico, but most Whigs opposed territorial growth, either because they wanted to prevent the spread of slavery or because they feared the debate over the status of slavery in the new territories would be divisive.

An army under General Winfield Scott captured Mexico City in September 1847, marking the end of major military operations in the war. In February 1848, Mexican and U.S. negotiators reached the Treaty of Guadalupe Hidalgo, which provided for the cession of Alta California and New Mexico. Despite Whig objections to the acquisition of Mexican territory, the treaty was ratified with the support of majorities of both Democrat and Whig senators. The Whigs voted for the treaty largely because ratification brought the war to an immediate end. Differences over slavery prevented Congress from passing any legislation to organize territorial governments in the Mexican Cession, as Northerners sought to exclude it and Southerners sought to allow it in the newly acquired territories.

=== Election of 1848 ===
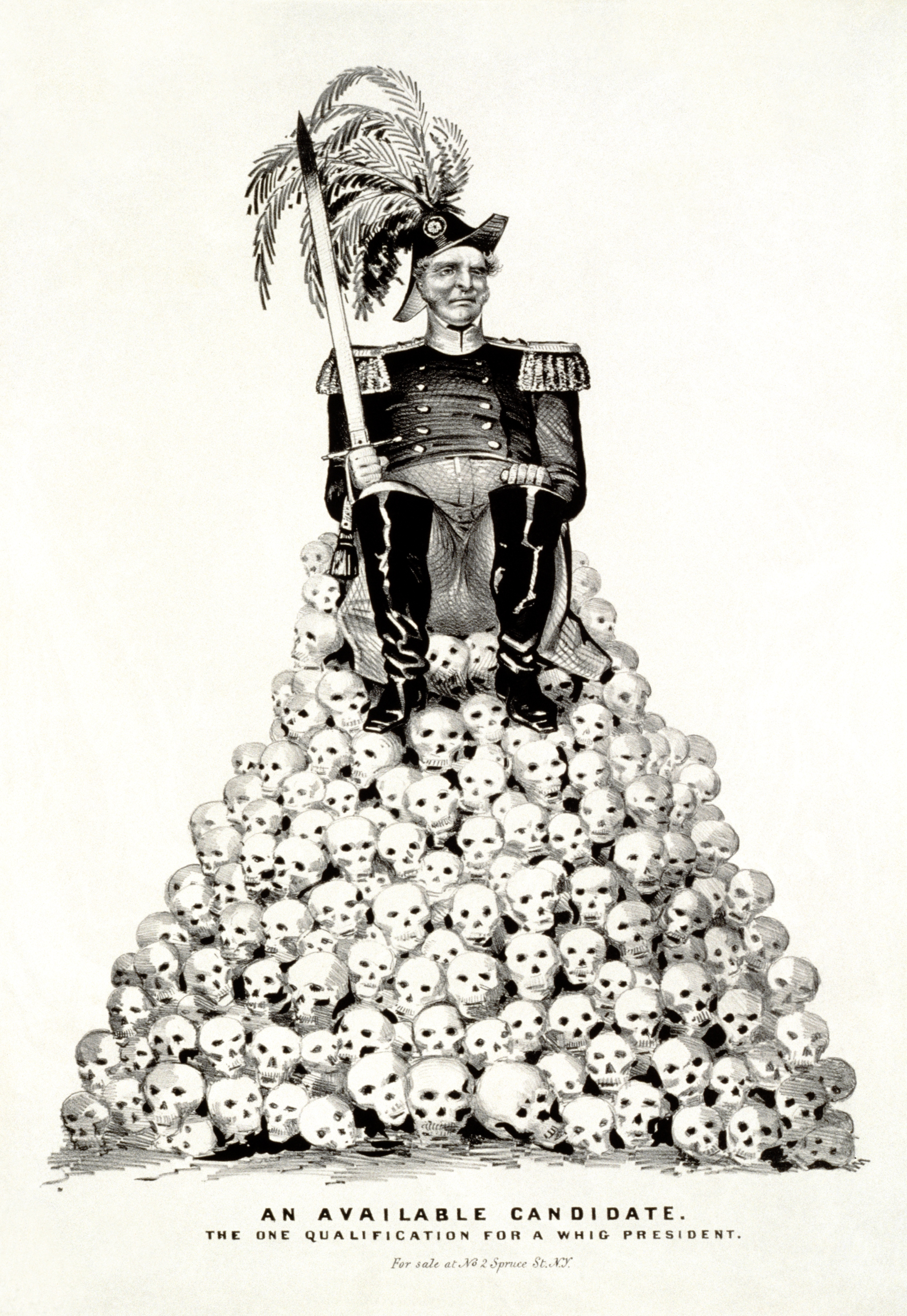
A political cartoon satirizing the candidacy of either Zachary Taylor or Winfield Scott in the 1848 presidential election

With the economy improving during Polk's presidency, Whig leaders like John J. Crittenden of Kentucky began to look to General Taylor as a presidential candidates in the hopes that the party could run on Taylor's personal popularity rather than economic issues. Taylor and his allies carefully cultivated his reputation as a plain-spoken man who put the good of the country above partisan squabbling. His candidacy faced significant resistance in the Whig Party due to his lack of public commitment to Whig policies and his association with the Mexican-American War. In late 1847, Clay emerged as Taylor's main opponent for the Whig nomination, appealing especially to Northern Whigs with his opposition to the war and the acquisition of new territory. The ratification of the Treaty of Guadalupe Hidalgo badly damaged Clay's candidacy in North, as Clay was unwilling to endorse the Wilmot Proviso but could no longer campaign on a platform opposed to territorial acquisition. Many anti-Clay Northerners backed the candidacy of Winfield Scott, who had distinguished himself in the Mexican-American War and who, unlike Taylor, had a long association with the Whig Party.

Taylor won 85 of the 111 slave state delegates on the first presidential ballot of the 1848 Whig National Convention, while free state delegates spread their votes among Clay, Taylor, Scott, and Webster. Taylor clinched the nomination on the fourth ballot after several delegates from both sections switched their support from Clay to Taylor. For vice president, the Whigs nominated Millard Fillmore of New York, a pro-Clay Northerner. Honoring his pledge to serve only one term, Polk declined to seek re-election in 1848, and the Democrats nominated Senator Lewis Cass of Michigan. Cass drew support from some Northern and Southern Democrats with his doctrine of popular sovereignty, under which each territory would decide the legal status of slavery. Anti-Clay Northern Whigs disaffected with Taylor joined with Democratic supporters of Martin Van Buren and some members of the Liberty Party to found the new Free Soil Party; the party nominated a ticket of Van Buren and Whig Charles Francis Adams Sr. and campaigned against the spread of slavery into the territories.

The Whig campaign in the North received a boost when Taylor released a public letter in which he stated that he favored Whig principles and would defer to Congress after taking office, thereby reassuring some wavering Whigs. During the campaign, Northern Whig leaders touted traditional Whig policies like support for infrastructure spending and increased tariff rates, but Southern Whigs largely eschewed economic policy, instead emphasizing that Taylor's status as a slaveholder meant that he could be trusted on the issue of slavery more so than Cass. Ultimately, Taylor won the election with a majority of the electoral vote and a plurality of the popular vote. Taylor improved on Clay's performance in the South and benefited from the defection of many Democrats to Van Buren in the North.

== Taylor and Fillmore, 1849–1853 ==
=== Taylor administration ===
Upon taking office, Taylor and his allies attempted to transform the Whig Party into a new organization centered on Taylor and centrist positions on issues like slavery and the tariff. In making Cabinet selections, Taylor selected individuals who were moderate on the issue of slavery and who had supported Taylor over Clay and other Whig leaders prior to the 1848 Whig convention. With Crittenden unwilling to leave his position as governor of Kentucky, Taylor appointed Crittenden's ally, John M. Clayton of Delaware, to the key position of Secretary of State. Reflecting the administration's desire to find a middle ground between traditional Whig and Democratic policies, Secretary of the Treasury William M. Meredith issued a report calling for an increase in tariff rates, but not to the levels seen under the Tariff of 1842. In part due to the federal deficits in the aftermath of the Mexican-American War, Meredith's report largely abandoned the traditional Whig policy of favoring federally-funded internal improvements. Meredith's policies were not adopted, and, partly due to the strong economic growth of the late 1840s and late 1850s, traditional Whig economic stances would increasingly lose their salience after 1848.

When Taylor assumed office, the organization of state and territorial governments and the status of slavery in the Mexican Cession remained the major issue facing Congress. To sidestep the issue of the Wilmot Proviso, the Taylor administration proposed that the lands of the Mexican Cession be admitted as states without first organizing territorial governments; thus, slavery in the area would be left to the discretion of state governments rather than the federal government. Taylor's plan was complicated by several factors, including Democratic control of Congress, ongoing sectional tensions over the status of slavery, and Texas's claim to all land in the Mexican Cession east of the Rio Grande River. In January 1850, Senator Clay introduced a separate proposal which included the admission of California as a free state, the cession by Texas of some of its northern and western territorial claims in return for debt relief, the establishment of New Mexico and Utah territories, a ban on the importation of slaves into the District of Columbia for sale, and a more stringent fugitive slave law. Clay's proposal won the backing of many Southern and Northern leaders, but Taylor opposed Clay's plan, since he favored granting California statehood immediately and denied the legitimacy of Texas's claims over New Mexico.

=== Fillmore and the Compromise of 1850 ===
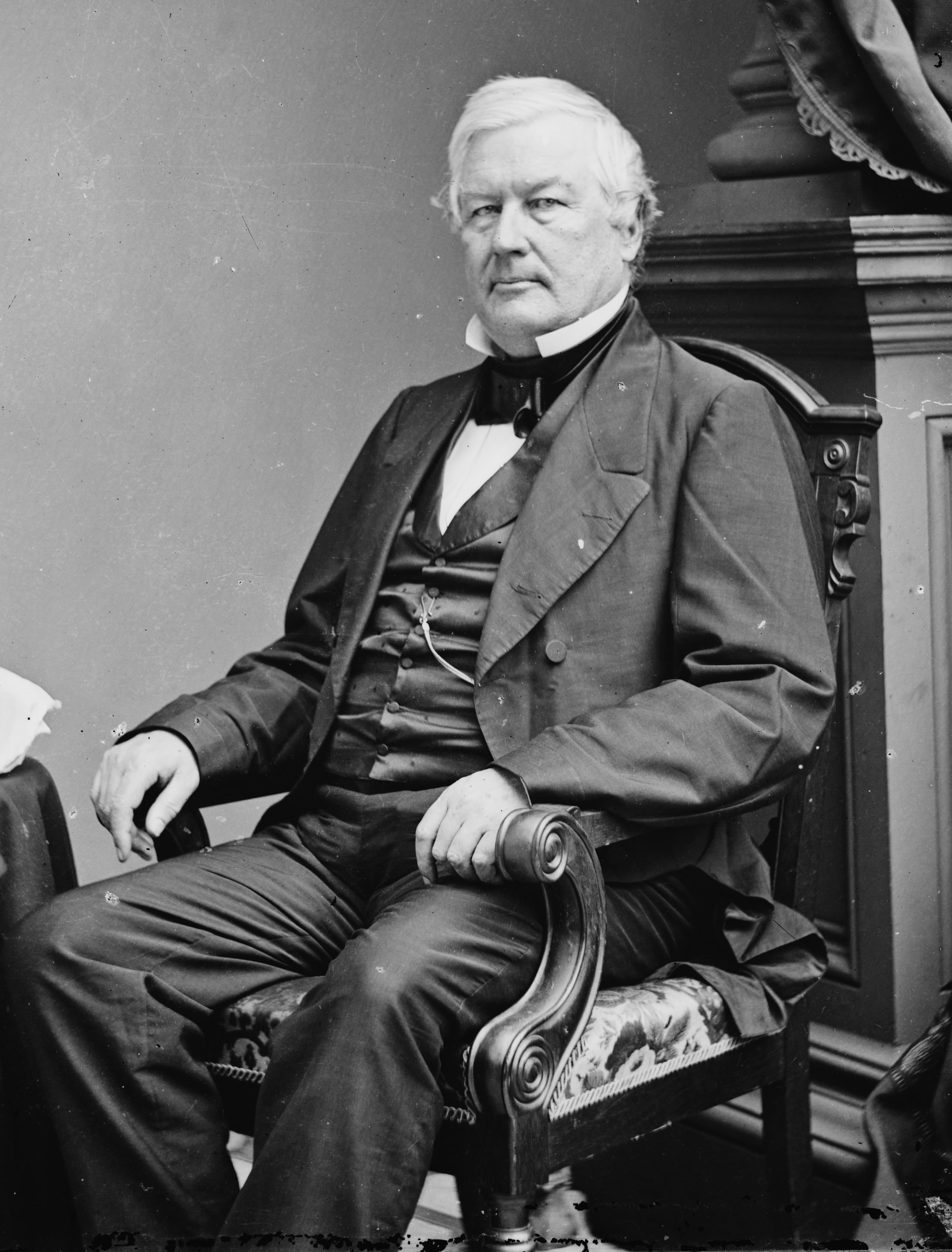
Millard Fillmore, the last Whig president

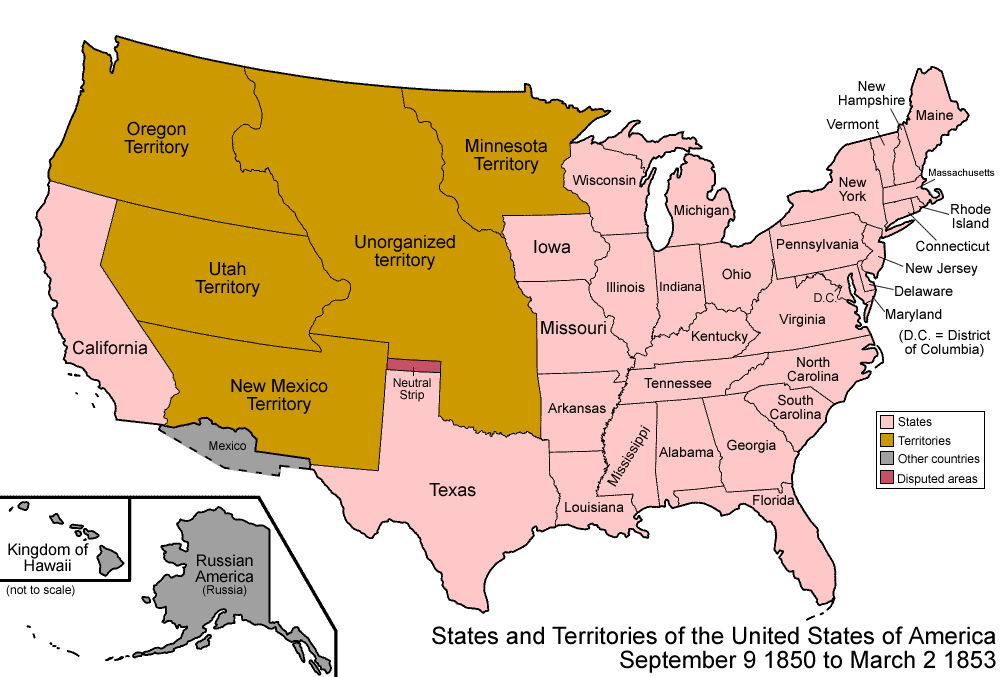
U.S. states and territories after the Compromise of 1850, which settled several issues in the aftermath of the Mexican–American War

Taylor died in July 1850 and was succeeded by Vice President Fillmore. In contrast to John Tyler, Fillmore's legitimacy and authority as president was widely accepted by members of Congress and the public. Partly to indicate his independence from Taylor, Fillmore accepted the resignation of Taylor's entire Cabinet and set about building a new one. The new president hoped to use the process of selecting the cabinet to re-unify the Whig Party, and he sought to balance the cabinet among North and South, pro-compromise and anti-compromise, and pro-Taylor and anti-Taylor. Among those who joined Fillmore's Cabinet were Crittenden, Thomas Corwin of Ohio, and Webster, whose support for the Compromise had outraged his Massachusetts constituents. Webster emerged as both the most controversial and most important figure in Fillmore's Cabinet. Meanwhile, with the apparent collapse of his proposed compromise, Clay took a temporary leave from the Senate, and Democratic Senator Stephen A. Douglas of Illinois took the lead in advocating for a compromise based largely on Clay's proposals.

In an August 1850 message, Fillmore urged Congress to settle the Texas–New Mexico boundary dispute as quickly as possible. With Fillmore's support, a Senate bill providing for a final settlement of Texas's borders won passage days after Fillmore delivered his message. Under the terms of the bill, the U.S. would assume Texas's debts, while Texas's northern border was set at the 36° 30' parallel north (the Missouri Compromise line) and much of its western border followed the 103rd meridian. The bill attracted the support of a bipartisan coalition of Whigs and Democrats from both sections, though most opposition to the bill came from the South. The Senate quickly moved onto the other major issues, passing bills that provided for the admission of California, the organization of New Mexico Territory, and the establishment of a new fugitive slave law. Passage of what became known as the Compromise of 1850 soon followed in the House of Representatives. Though the future of slavery in New Mexico, Utah, and other territories remained unclear, Fillmore himself described the Compromise of 1850 as a "final settlement" of sectional issues.

Following the passage of the Compromise of 1850, Fillmore's enforcement of the Fugitive Slave Act of 1850 became the central issue of his administration. The Fugitive Slave Act created the first national system of law enforcement by appointing federal commissioner in every county to hear fugitive slave cases and enforce the fugitive slave law. Many in the North felt that the Fugitive Slave Act effectively brought slavery into their home states, and while the abolitionist movement remained weak, many Northerners increasingly came to detest slavery. The Whig Party became badly split between pro-Compromise Whigs like Fillmore and Webster and anti-Compromise Whigs like William Seward, who demanded the repeal of the Fugitive Slave Act. In the Deep South, most Whigs joined with pro-Compromise Democrats to form a unionist party during the 1850 elections, decisively defeating their opponents and ending any threat of Southern secession in 1850. Though Webster hoped to supplant the Whig Party with a new Union Party, the unionist movement did not spread outside the Deep South and had largely collapsed by 1852.

=== Election of 1852 ===
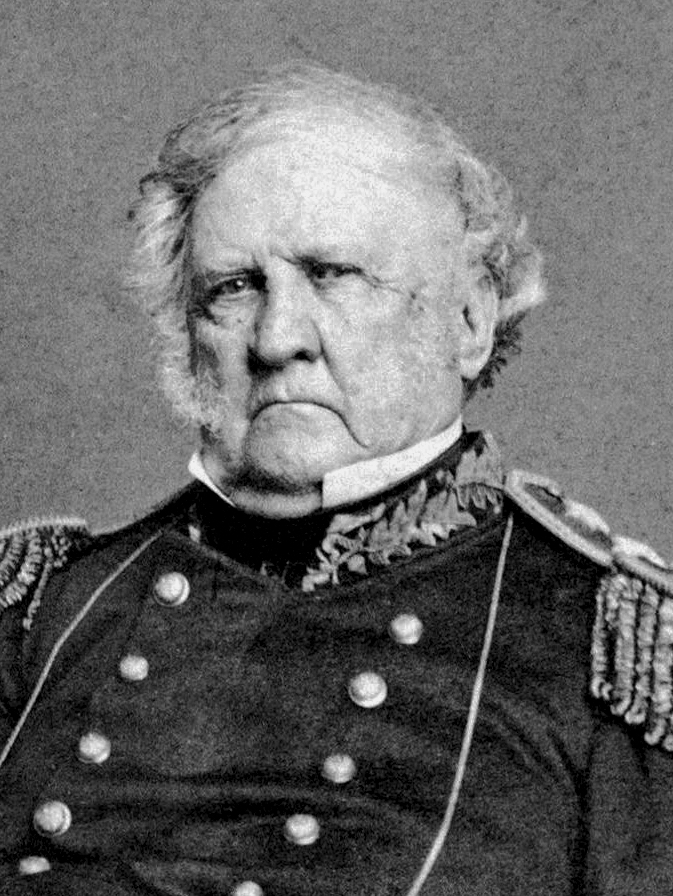
Winfield Scott, the unsuccessful Whig candidate in the 1852 presidential election

Though Fillmore's enforcement of the Fugitive Slave Act made him unpopular among many in the North, he retained considerable support from the South, where he was seen as the only candidate capable of uniting the party. Meanwhile, Secretary Webster had long coveted the presidency and, though in poor health, planned a final attempt to gain the White House. Fillmore was sympathetic to the ambitions of his longtime friend, but was reluctant to rule out accepting the party's 1852 nomination, as he feared doing so would allow Seward to gain control of the party. A third candidate emerged in the form of General Winfield Scott, who, like previously successful Whig presidential nominees William Henry Harrison and Zachary Taylor, had earned fame for his martial accomplishments. Scott had supported the Compromise of 1850, but his association with Senator William Seward of New York made him unacceptable to Southern Whigs. Thus, approaching the June 1852 Whig National Convention in Baltimore, the major candidates were Fillmore, Webster, and Scott. On the convention's first presidential ballot, Fillmore received 133 of the necessary 147 votes, while Scott won 131 and Webster won 29. Fillmore and Webster supporters sought to broker a deal to unite behind either candidate, but they were unsuccessful and balloting continued. On the 48th ballot, Webster delegates began to defect to Scott, and the general gained the nomination on the 53rd ballot. For vice president, the Whigs nominated Secretary of the Navy William Alexander Graham of North Carolina.

Democrat Franklin Pierce defeated Whig Winfield Scott in the 1852 election

The 1852 Democratic National Convention nominated a dark horse candidate in the form of former New Hampshire senator Franklin Pierce, who had been out of national politics for nearly a decade before 1852. The nomination of Pierce, a Northerner sympathetic to the Southern view on slavery, united Democrats from both the North and South. As the Whig and Democratic national conventions had approved similar platforms, the 1852 election focused largely on the personalities of Scott and Pierce. Though most Free Soil leaders favored Scott over Pierce, the party once again ran a presidential ticket in 1852, nominating Senator John P. Hale of New Hampshire for president. At the same time, some pro-Compromise Whigs and nativist groups ran Webster on an independent ticket. (Note: Webster died before the election, but still received several thousand votes in the election.) Both candidacies cut into Scott's base of support and signaled Whig discontent in the North. The 1852 elections proved to be disastrous for the Whig Party, as Scott was defeated by a wide margin and the Whigs lost several congressional and state elections. Scott won just four states and 44 percent of the popular vote, while Pierce won just under 51 percent of the popular vote and a large majority of the electoral vote. Scott amassed more votes than Taylor had in most Northern states, but Democrats benefited from a surge of new voters in the North and the collapse of Whig strength in much of the South.

== Collapse, 1853–1856 ==
=== Pierce administration ===
Despite their decisive loss in the 1852 elections, most Whig leaders believed the party could recover during the Pierce presidency in much the same way that it had recovered under President Polk. However, the strong economy still prevented the Whig economic program from regaining salience, and the party failed to develop an effective platform on which to campaign. The debate over the 1854 Kansas–Nebraska Act, which effectively repealed the Missouri Compromise by allowing slavery in territories north of the 36°30′ parallel, shook up traditional partisan alignments. The party divided along sectional lines, as Southern Whigs supported the Kansas–Nebraska Act and Northern Whigs strongly opposed it.

Across the Northern states, the Kansas–Nebraska Act gave rise to anti-Nebraska coalitions consisting of Free Soilers, Whigs, and Democrats opposed to the Kansas–Nebraska Act. In Michigan and Wisconsin, these two coalitions labeled themselves as the Republican Party, but similar groups in other states initially took on different names. Like their Free Soil predecessors, Republican leaders generally did not call for the abolition of slavery, but instead sought to prevent the extension of slavery into the territories. Another political coalition appeared in the form of the nativist and anti-Catholic Know Nothing movement, which eventually organized itself into the American Party. Both the Republican Party and the Know Nothings portrayed themselves as the natural Whig heirs in the battle against Democratic executive tyranny, but the Republicans focused on the "Slave Power" and the Know Nothings focused on the supposed danger of mass immigration and a Catholic conspiracy. While the Republican Party almost exclusively appealed to Northerners, the Know Nothings gathered many adherents in both the North and South; some individuals joined both groups even while they remained part of the Whig Party or the Democratic Party.

Congressional Democrats suffered huge losses in the mid-term elections of 1854, as voters provided support to a wide array of new parties opposed to the Democratic Party. Though several successful congressional candidates had campaigned only as Whigs, most congressional candidates who were not affiliated with the Democratic Party had campaigned either independently of the Whig Party or in fusion with another party. As cooperation between Northern and Southern Whigs appeared increasingly unlikely, leaders from both sections continued to abandon the party. While Seward and many other Northern leaders increasingly gravitated towards the Republican Party, Fillmore and his allies settled on a strategy of using the Know Nothings as a vehicle for Fillmore's pro-union candidacy in the 1856 election. A smaller group of Northern Whig leaders, including Edward Everett, rejected both new parties and continued to adhere to the Whig Party. In the South, most Whigs abandoned their party for the Know Nothings, though some joined the Democratic Party instead.

=== 1856 election ===
Though he did not share the nativist views of the Know Nothings, in 1855 Fillmore became a member of the Know Nothing movement and encouraged his Whig followers to join as well. Seeking to ensure the party would avoid the sectional tensions that had plagued the Whigs, the Know Nothings adopted a platform pledging not to repeal the Fugitive Slave Act or the Kansas-Nebraska Act. In September 1855, Seward led his faction of Whigs into the Republican Party, effectively marking the end of the Whig Party as an independent and significant political force. Seward stated that the Whigs had been "a strong and vigorous party," but also a party that was "moved by panics and fears to emulate the Democratic Party in its practiced subserviency" to the Slave Power. Thus, the 1856 presidential election became a three-sided contest between Democrats, Know Nothings, and Republicans.

The Know Nothing National Convention nominated Fillmore for president, but disagreements over the party platform's stance on slavery caused many Northern Know Nothings to abandon the party. Meanwhile, the 1856 Republican National Convention chose John C. Frémont as the party's presidential candidate. The defection of many Northern Know Nothings, combined with the caning of Charles Sumner and other events that stoked sectional tensions, bolstered Republicans throughout the North. During his campaign, Fillmore minimized the issue of nativism, instead attempting to use his campaign as a platform for unionism and a revival of the Whig Party. Seeking to rally support from Whigs who had yet to join another party, Fillmore and his allies organized the sparsely-attended 1856 Whig National Convention, which nominated Fillmore for president. Ultimately, Democrat James Buchanan won the election with a majority of the electoral vote and 45 percent of the popular vote; Frémont won most of the remaining electoral votes and took 33 percent of the popular vote, while Fillmore won 21.6 percent of the popular vote and just eight electoral votes. Fillmore largely retained Taylor and Scott voters in the South, but most former Whigs in the North voted for Frémont rather than Fillmore. Nevertheless, Fillmore's candidacy cut into Fremont's base, especially in Pennsylvania, and likely delivered the election to Buchanan. The remnants of the Whig Party regrouped in the Constitutional Union Party and backed the John Bell-Edward Everett ticket in 1860. These last remnants died out with the start of the Civil War.
