= N. A. McNairy =

Nashville lawyer, slave trader (1779–1851)

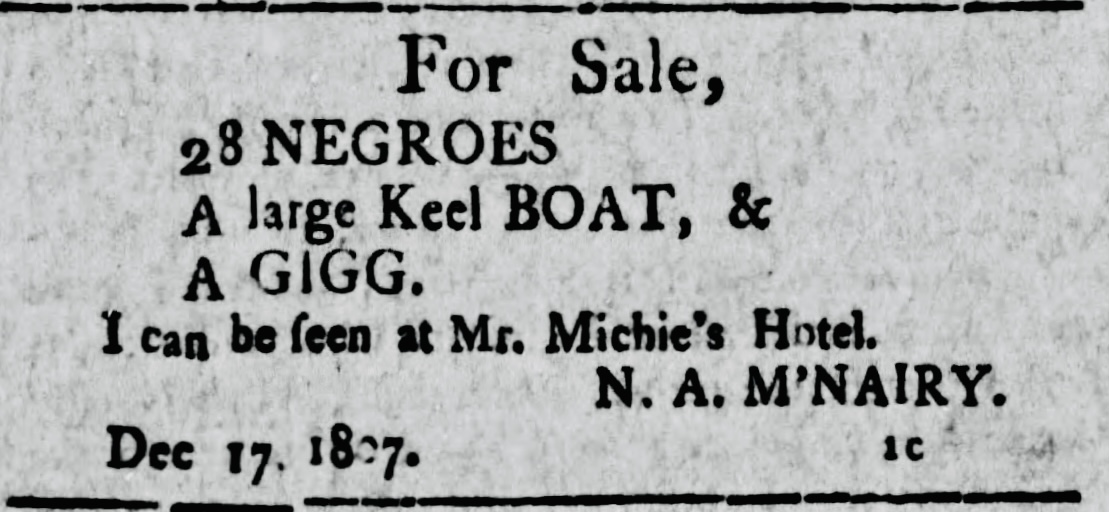
Like Jackson and Erwin, N. A. McNairy was a prominent white settler of Nashville. He arrived in Natchez on December 17, 1807, ready to sell slaves, the keel boat they came in, and a "gigg" (probably roughly equivalent to a rowboat). (Natchez Gazette, January 14, 1808)

Nathaniel A. McNairy (March 17, 1779 – September 7, 1851) was a prominent early settler of Nashville, Tennessee, United States. He was a lawyer, his brother John McNairy was a federal judge, and another brother Boyd McNairy was a doctor. In 1806 he was reportedly party to what the Papers of Andrew Jackson described as an "aborted duel" with Andrew Jackson's business partner John Coffee. John Brahan wrote to John Overton about the conflict, "Now Coffee comes on the ground; it is said that he attacked McNary at Winn's Tavern with a loaded whip, that in the scuffle Mr McNairy got the whip from Mr. Coffee: at which time Mr. Coffee drew a Pistol...Yesterday there was a Gentleman & Lady at Mr. [Thomas Norris] Clarks, who lives within five miles of Nashville, they told Mr. Clark that Mr. Coffee & McMcNairy had met & fought a day or two before they left Nashville, & that Mr. Coffee had recived [sic] a slight wound."

On December 17, 1807, he placed a runway slave ad in the newspaper, seeking to recover John, and stated, "I bought him near Norfolk in Virginia and I suppose he will attempt to return hither."

Like his neighbors Joseph Erwin and Andrew Jackson, McNairy was a seasonal slave trader, traveling south to the Natchez District on at least one occasion and advertising for sale 29 slaves, one keelboat, and one gigg in January 1808.

One of series of "Nashville Memories" articles published in the Nashville Banner in 1884–85 stated, "In early times what were called good, old, blue stocking Presbyterians held sway. Dancing, theatre-going, and such like entertainments were not countenanced by them. Mr. Nathaniel McNairy gave the lot on which the first church was built. He gave it with the proviso that it should always be used as a church lot. Some years after the erection of the church the tinners, in soldering in some ornament about the tower, it is thought, were careless with the furnace they had. At any rate, the church was burned [and] another was built." According to the centennial history of Nashville's First Presbyterian Church, "On March 1, 1806, N. A. McNairy met Gen. John Coffee on the field of honor. The meeting grew out of the Jackson–Dickinson controversy, which ended in a duel fatal to Dickinson. The writer is of the opinion that this was the same N. A. McNairy who was elected an elder in 1824 and continued as such until his death, September 7, 1851." In 1852, there were 50 "valuable negroes" to be sold at auction "in families" from a "great sale of negroes, cattle, mules" from McNairy's plantation.

== See also ==
- List of slave traders of the United States

== Sources ==
- Beard, William E. (1915). "The History of the First Church". The Addresses Delivered in Connection with the Observance of the One Hundredth Anniversary, November 8–15, 1914. First Presbyterian Church. Nashville: Foster & Parkes. pp. 47–71. OCLC 8555700. OL 23359651M – via HathiTrust.
- Carey, Bill (2018). Runaways, Coffles and Fancy Girls: A History of Slavery in Tennessee. Nashville, Tennessee: Clearbrook Press. ISBN 978-0-9725680-4-3. LCCN 2018903570. OCLC 1045068878.
- Marshall, Park (March 1916). "The Topographical Beginnings of Nashville". Tennessee Historical Magazine. 2 (1). Tennessee Historical Society: 31–39. ISSN 2333-9012. JSTOR 42637962.
- Sherwin, Oscar (April 1945). "Trading in Negroes". Negro History Bulletin. 8 (7): 160–166. JSTOR 44214396.
- Various; Jackson, Andrew (1984). Moser, Harold D.; MacPherson, Sharon (eds.). The Papers of Andrew Jackson, Volume II, 1804–1813. Knoxville, Tennessee: University of Tennessee Press. ISBN 978-0-87049-441-3. LCCN 79015078. OCLC 5029597.
