= Donelson family =

Pioneer Americans

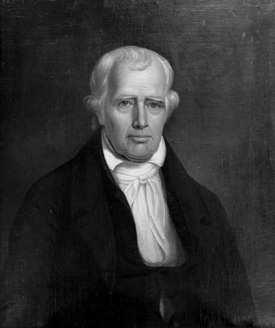
Often identified as the pioneer who came west with James Robertson, this portrait was painted by Ralph Earl and actually depicts his son, John Donelson (1755–1830), sometimes numbered John Donelson III

The Donelson family of Tennessee, which included Andrew Jackson amongst its number, was an influential family of the U.S. South before the American Civil War. As an 1859 history told it, "Taking Colonel Donelson as the radix, and tracing out the descendants and connections for the last fifty years, we find, especially in the South and Southwest, the alliance to be extensive and influential in political and military position...The ramifications down to the present day are too numerous and widespread to be inserted in this work." An 1880 history of Tennessee concurred that the legacy of the family was substantial: "[John Donelson's] descendants and connections for nearly three-fourths of a century in the South and Southwest have been extensive and influential both in civil and military affairs."

John Donelson was an early pioneer of the middle Tennessee area of the United States. Rachel Stockley Donelson was delivered of 11 children who survived to adulthood. Seven of the Donelson siblings married and started families, producing an average of nine children per family. Their daughter Rachel Donelson's second husband was Andrew Jackson, who became the seventh president of the United States in 1828. The family originated in the Thirteen Colonies but over time established branches in Tennessee, Alabama, Mississippi, Louisiana, Florida, Texas, and beyond. In the telling of Jackson biographer Mark R. Cheathem, "Orphaned and alone, Jackson replaced the family he had lost with a kinship network composed of his wife's extended family and his political allies. He valued these political and familial kin because they gave his world economic and emotional stability."

As per the editors of The Papers of Andrew Jackson, "The marriages of Rachel Jackson's brothers and sisters produced more than 50 adult children and innumerable grandchildren." The descendants of John Donelson are collectively notable because in marrying into the family, Andrew Jackson "gained an army of brothers, literally, and together these members of the kinship network created an efficient system that provided profits for all. Few other frontier families would employ family networking quite so effectively, but while their strategies were exceptionally efficient, they were also representative of the types of networking that was going on, usually on a smaller scale." Jackson and his Donelson kinsmen, and friends, engaged in what has been described as vertically integrated family-business imperialism: "They fought the native peoples, negotiated the treaties to end the fighting and demanded native lands as the price of war, surveyed the newly available lands, bought those lands, litigated over disputed boundaries, adjudicated the cases, and made and kept laws within the region that had been carved out of Indian lands." The lands that the Donelsons examined and collected were intended for use by "free, white, propertied citizens," including slave owners, not for the Indigenous people who already lived there.

Andrew Jackson, who had no biological children of his own but served as patriarch of the clan, supplemented the "literal army" designation by obtaining appointments to the U.S. Military Academy for his nephews Andrew Jackson Donelson, Daniel Smith Donelson, and Samuel Jackson Hays; his grand-nephews Earl Van Dorn, Richard Hays, and Andrew Jackson Coffee; and ward Edward G. W. Butler. He also used his influence in an attempt to obtain academy appointment for the sons of allies living and dead, including the son of his deceased War of 1812 aide-de-camp John S. Reid and the sons of Virginian politician William Giles. Intriguingly, Congressman Davy Crockett, who started out as a Tennessee militiaman in Jackson's Creek War, wanted to abolish West Point on the grounds that "only the sons of the rich and influential could get into the Academy, and that the bounty of the government should go to the poor rather than the rich."

Many members of the earliest iteration of the clan settled in "the Hermitage neighborhood [that] was regarded as the best section of Davidson County, the soil being better adapted for cotton than any other part of the country, and was settled by wealthy men and cotton-planters; among them were Gen. Jackson, Col. Edward Ward (who was speaker of the Senate in 1817, a man of talent and fine personal appearance, was a candidate for Governor, and beaten for that office by Gen. William Carroll), Maj. William Ward, Capt. John Donelson, the brother of Mrs. Jackson and the father of Mrs. Gen. Coffee, Mrs. McLemore, Mrs. William Easton, Mrs. James Martin, and Mrs. Andrew J. Donelson. Capt. Donelson was a wealthy man in lands and slaves, and a successful planter. Sevan [Leven?] and Severn Donelson were also brothers of Mrs. Jackson. Gen. Thomas Overton, the friend of Gen. Jackson in the duel with Charles Dickinson, Dr. Hadley, Capt. Moseley, the step-father of John L. Brown, of Nashville, and others, all lived in this neighborhood. There also lived here John Anthony Winston and brother, two very prominent men, who emigrated to Alabama and settled near Tuscumbia. They are the ancestors of the numerous Winstons in that State, among whom was Governor John A. Winston."

Note 1: Numbering of John Donelsons gets messy. The father of the first generation of children listed here was technically John Donelson II since his father was a John Donelson. Rachel's brother is often listed as John Donelson II (simply because his less famous grandfather has not been a major figure in histories), but he is here deemed John Donelson III for clarity, and his son is thus John Donelson IV.

Note 2: For purposes of this list, the children of cousins who married cousins are listed under the male partner.

1. Alexander "Sandy" Donelson (unmarried, no issue)

2. Mary "Mattie" Donelson m. John Caffery; Caffery was part of Donelson's expedition on the Adventure. In October 1800, Caffrey advertised that he would soon "descend the river to New Orleans" in boats that were being constructed at Lancaster's saw-mill at the confluence of Caney Fork and the Cumberland River near present-day Carthage, Tennessee. In 1936 a descendant wrote, "Their home was in Natchez, Miss., where John Caffery was engaged in the mercantile business, in the employ of Andrew Jackson." An 1807 journal of the Natchez Trace suggests that she may have lived northeast of the Grindstone Ford. He was on the 1810 census for the combined Claiborne-Warren County census in Mississippi. Caffery & Jackson paid taxes on 35 slaves in Attakapas in 1810, present-day St. Mary Parish, Louisiana—this might be one of the sons and Washington Jackson.

2.1. John Caffery Jr. m. Catherine Smith; Caffrey served in the Creek War and "killed an Indian" at the Battle of Horseshoe Bend

2.2. Rachel Caffery m. George Walker (Note: The Walker brothers who married the Caffrey sisters had a sister, Helen Walker Call, who was the mother of Richard Keith Call. Call was an officer in the Creek War and the War of 1812 under General Jackson, and was appointed governor of Florida Territory by President Andrew Jackson. Another Walker brother, David Walker, was the father of Florida governor David S. Walker.)

2.3. Sarah Caffery m. John Walker

2.3.?. John George Walker

2.4. Eliza Caffery m. Abraham Green (Note: Son of Thomas M. Green Sr., brother of Thomas M. Green Jr. and Abner Green, brother-in-law of Thomas Hinds and Cato West)

2.5. Mary "Patsy" Caffery m. John Knox; (Note: Reportedly a cousin of James K. Polk) Knox lived in Claiborne County, Mississippi and relocated to Tennessee shortly before his death; Knox was a second cousin to James Knox Polk

2.5.1. Sarah Knox m. (a) Benjamin Newton, (b) Dr. Arva Wilson, (c) George Washington Sevier Jr.; (Note: George Washington Sevier Jr. was a grandson of John Sevier) many descendants of Knox's third marriage in Madison Parish, Louisiana

2.5.1c.1. Mary Catherine Sevier

2.5.1c.2. George Washington Sevier III

2.5.1c.3. Andrew Jackson Sevier

2.5.1c.4. Jennie Vertner Sevier

2.5.1c.5. Eliza Donelson Sevier

2.5.2. William Luckey Knox; his father died when he was a year old, he lived at the Hermitage as a child but ran away when he was 13 "and went to Louisiana, the southern part"; served in the Louisiana state legislature; Representative from Carroll Parish in 1857 and 1859; had a least one daughter; moved to Texas in 1874, postmaster at Mesquite, elected county commissioner, buried in Dallas

2.6. Nancy Caffery m. John Jenkins

2.6.? Donelson Jenkins

2.7. Sophia Caffery m. Peter Aaron Van Dorn

2.7.1. Mary Van Dorn m. John Overton Lacey

2.7.2. Jane Van Dorn m. John David Vertner

2.7.2.1. Daniel Vertner

2.7.2.2. Margaret Dunlop Vertner

2.7.2.3. Aaron Van Dorn Vertner, lieutenant, Confederate States Army; aide to his uncle Gen. Van Dorn and then to General Thomas C. Hindman; killed at Shiloh

2.7.2.4. J. D. Vertner, Mississippi State Senator

2.7.3. Octavia Van Dorn m. (a) Alison Ross, (b) Vance Murray Sulivane

2.7.3a.1. Isaac Allison Ross m. Eugenia Calhoun

2.7.3b.1. Clement Sulivane

2.7.3b.2. Octavia Sulivane

2.7.4. Earl Van Dorn m. Caroline Godblod; he was awarded a West Point commission by intervention of Andrew Jackson

2.7.4.1. Olivia Van Dorn, married w four children

2.7.4.2. Earl Van Dorn Jr.

2.7.5. Aaron Van Dorn, an important early cartographer of Death Valley

2.7.6. Mabella Van Dorn; died in childhood; her sister Octavia survived the same illness

2.7.7. Sarah Ross Van Dorn, died as a child

2.7.8. Emily Donelson Van Dorn m. William Trigg Miller; Emily Van Dorn Miller is believed to have written A Soldier's Honor (1902) about her brother Earl Van Dorn's military career (Note: W. T. Miller was from a Whig-aligned family with roots in Virginia and Kentucky; the father, Anderson Miller, was appointed to be the U.S. marshal for the Southern District of Mississippi in 1841, a brother Horace H. Miller was named charges des affaires for Bolivia in 1852.)

2.7.8.?. Thomas Marshall Miller, attorney general of Mississippi

2.7.9. Jacob Van Dorn, died as a child

2.8. Donelson Caffery m. Lydia Murphy, "wages and expenses" for him listed on a bill of "Aaron Burr in account with Andrew Jackson"; according to the editors of The Papers of Andrew Jackson, "In 1828, then living in Mississippi, he said that Burr, whom he met in December 1806 when they were lodging at the same house, asked him to serve as a confidential messenger to Chillicothe, Ohio. Caffery said he insisted on consulting Jackson, who advised him to have nothing to do with Burr," lived in St. Mary Parish, Louisiana in the 1810s; in 1813, bought land near Franklin, Louisiana and Bayou Teche that became Alexander Porter's Oak Lawn plantation with Washington Jackson; at the time of the 1828 U.S. presidential election, Joshua Baker wrote the Virginia Advocate that "This conversation [with an acquaintance of Aaron Burr] awakened General Jackson's suspicions, for he wrote to Governor Claiborne, putting him upon his guard against Burr...General Jackson also recalled from the service of Burr all his young relatives who had been induced to join Burr under the belief that he was going to revolutionize the Spanish dominions in North America. Mr. Caffrey was one of them. I think (though I will not be positive,) that Mr. C. showed me Gen. J's letter to him, advising him to abandon Burr"; appointed during the Jackson administration and served briefly in 1831 as collector of customs for the district of Teche and inspector of the revenue for the port of Franklin, Louisiana

2.9.1. Donelson Caffery II m. Bethia Richardson; family archive held in special collections at University of North Carolina; U.S. Senator from Louisiana (1892–1901)

2.9.1.1. Donelson Caffrey III

2.9.1.2. Francis "Frank" Caffery

2.9.1.3. Ralph Earl Caffery

2.9.1.3.10. Patrick T. Caffery

2.9.1.4. Gertrude Caffery

2.9.1.5. John Murphy Caffery m. Mary Temperance Free; U.S. Naval Academy, businessman, Louisiana State Senator, lived Franklin, Louisiana

2.9.1.6. St. John Liddell "Liddell" Caffrey

2.9.1.7. Bethia Richardson Caffery

2.9.1.8. Charles Smith Caffery, U.S. Army colonel, author of the Caffery family history/genealogy

2.9.1.9. Edward Webster Caffery

2.9.2. Emma Caffery m. Patrick Hardiman Thomson

2.10. Jane Caffery m. Ralph E. W. Earl

2.11. Jefferson Caffery m. Marie Alix Demarest; he owned 75 slaves in the vicinity of Bayou Teche in 1820; for more on a Caffery in the vicinity of Irish Bend on Bayou Teche see memoirs of Martha Martin

2.11.3. Jefferson Jackson Caffery m. Anna Maria Crow

2.11.3.3. Charles Duval Caffery m. Mary Catherine Parkerson; mayor of Lafayette, Louisiana

2.11.3.3.1. Jefferson Caffery

3. Catherine Donelson m. Thomas Hutchings; Catherine was born in Pittsylvania County, Virginia; like three of the Donelson brothers and Robert Hays, Hutchings worked as a land surveyor; Hutchings was part of Donelson's expedition on the Adventure

3.1. John Hutchings m. Mary "Polly" Smith; (Note: Polly Smith was a niece of William Smith, U.S. Senator from South Carolina) served in the War of 1812/Creek War with Andrew Jackson

3.1.1. Andrew Jackson Hutchings m. Mary Coffee [6.7.1]

3.2. Lemuel Hutchings m. [unknown] Owen

3.2.1. Alexander Hutchings

3.2.2. Arthur Hutchings

3.2.3. Stokely Donelson Hutchings

3.2.?. Two other daughters

3.3. Christopher Hutchings m. Louisa Ann Edwards; served in the War of 1812/Creek War with Andrew Jackson; seemingly settled in Huntsville, Alabama

3.3.1. Mary Hutchings m. John H. Cross, owned plantation in Poinsett County, Arkansas

3.3.2. Elizabeth Cooke Hutchings

3.3.3. John Hutchings, seemingly died young

3.3.4. Frank Hutchings

3.3.5. Jackson Hutchings

3.3.6. Fannie A. Hutchings

3.3.7. John Hutchings

3.3.8. Stockley D. Hutchings, known as S. D. Hutchings, he settled in Madison County, Alabama and was appointed postmaster of Huntsville, Alabama, which was at that time "a political appointment"; owned plantation in Holmes County, Mississippi

3.3.9. William E. Hutchings

3.4. Rachel Donelson Hutchings m. James Smith Rawlings; Rawlings admitted to practice as a lawyer in Mississippi Territory in 1806?; Rawlings ran a tavern in Huntsville, Alabama circa 1819 that was later known as the Planter's Hotel

3.4.1. John Hutchings Rawlings m. Sarah Jane Hays [5.1.1.]

3.4.2. Eliza C. Rawlings

3.4.3. Edwin Rawlings

3.4.4. Jackson C. Rawlings

3.5. Mary Hutchings m. Daniel Small

3.6. Jennie Hutchings

3.7. Elizabeth Hutchings m. Bryant

3.8. Thomas Hutchings II, settled in Huntsville, Alabama

3.9. Stockley Donelson Hutchings m. Elizabeth Atwood; Stockley D. Hutchings was quartermaster sergeant in Andrew Jackson's Tennessee Volunteers in 1812

3.9.1. Mary Catherine Hutchings m. James Murdack

3.9.2. Elizabeth A. Hutchings m. Andrew J. Coffee [6.7.4.]

3.10. William E. Hutchings

4. Stockley Donelson m. Elizabeth Glasgow, no issue; (Note: Daughter of James Glasgow, center of a North Carolina land speculation scandal; she remarried after Donelson's death) described as "among the most prominent land speculators in the region;" he was appointed surveyor of the breakaway state of Franklin in 1784; Donelson conveyed two tracts of land to Andrew Jackson in September 1787; implicated in the Glasgow land frauds and described by NCpedia as "the most active, charming, accommodating, cunning, and indefatigable practitioner of fraud and deceit to be found in the state service"; served in North Carolina state and Southwest territorial legislatures; in January 1805 he was a signatory to a petition protesting the court-martial of Thomas Butler, probably produced at the behest of Andrew Jackson; died September 1805

5. Jane Donelson m. Robert Hays; Hays founded a settlement called Haysborough; Jane outlived all but one of her siblings

5.1. Rachel Hays m. Robert Butler

5.1.1. Andrew Jackson Butler

5.1.2. Mary Lucinda Butler

5.2 Stockley Donelson Hays m. Lydia Butler

5.2.1. Sarah Jane Hays m. John Hutchings Rawlings [3.4.1.]

5.2.2. Richard Jackson "Hickory" "Dick" Hays; admitted to West Point in 1838, where he was in the same class as Henry Eustis, William S. Rosecrans, John Pope, Abner Doubleday, James Longstreet, Cave Johnson Couts, and his cousin Earl Van Dorn, but he was ranked 85 out of 86 students his first year ("remarks: deficient") and did not graduate; first mayor of Jackson, Tennessee, prominent judge and lawyer

5.2.2.1. Stokley D. Hays, lawyer

5.2.2.2. [daughter] m. Ross Witherspoon

5.3. Martha Thompson Hays, called Patsy, m. Dr. William E. Butler

5.3.1. William Ormonde Butler m. Martha Ann Hale; officer Mexican–American War

5.3.1.1. Mary Ormonde Butler m. Thomas Henderson (CSA)

5.3.1.2. Martha A. Butler m. C. W. Chancellor (CSA, consul at Havre, France)

5.3.1.3. William Edward Butler Jr. m. Susan P. Henderson; Confederate officer

5.3.?. Mary Jane Butler

5.4. Samuel Jackson Hays m. Frances Middleton

5.4.1. Andrew Jackson Hays m. Elizabeth McLemore Walker (Note: Elizabeth McLemore Walker > James Monroe Walker > Mary McLemore > John C. McLemore.)

5.4.1.?. James Walker Hays, business manager Memphis Commercial Appeal

5.4.?. Robert B. Hays

5.4.?. John Middleton Hays; dropped out of UNC to join Confederate Army, wounded at Shiloh, "rode with Forrest," cofounded local chapter of Ku Klux Klan

5.5. Narcissa Hays (unmarried, no issue); as "Aunt Nar," raised her grandnephew Chester George Bond, later a judge; Aunt Nar was said to be a great fisherwoman

5.6 Elizabeth Hays m. Robert I. Chester; (Note: Chester's second wife was Jane Roysler Donelson, widow of 10.6. Samuel Rucker Donelson.) R. I. Chester is the namesake of Chester County, Tennessee

5.7 Mary S. Hays (d. 1815, age 18)

6. John Donelson III m. Mary Purnell; Mary was a 16-year-old pregnant newlywed at the time of the Adventure journey; Andrew Jackson called her "Sister Mary" John III reportedly served in the American Revolutionary War, and was one of several brothers and brothers-in-law who was trained as a surveyor; resident in the Cole's Creek neighborhood of the Spanish Natchez District in the 1790s; justice of Davidson County Court of Pleas and Quarter Sessions, April 1788 to January 1791

6.1. Chesed Donelson (died in infancy)

6.2. Tabitha Donelson m. George Smith (Note: Son of U.S. Senator Daniel Smith)

6.3. Alexander Donelson, called "Sandy," scouted lands on the Tombigbee in 1811, participated in the fight with the Benton brothers in Nashville in September 1813; aide-de-camp to brother-in-law John Coffee; shot in the head and killed at the Battle of Emuckfaw in January 1814

6.4. John Donelson IV m. Eliza Eleanor Butler; (Note: Eliza Eleanor Butler was one of four siblings who were made wards of Andrew Jackson; Edward Butler was her father, Edward G. W. Butler was her brother) "after engaging in several Indian battles, was appointed Captain of U. S. Rangers by President Madison. He fought under General Jackson in the battle around New Orleans, and at the storming of Pensacola." Jesse Benton alleged that Donelson and John Gordon aided Jackson in a predatory land speculation in Pensacola in 1817–18 in conjunction with Jackson's invasion of Florida. May have been known as Captain Jack Donelson.

6.5. Lemuel Donelson m. Eliza White (Note: Daughter of Judge Hugh Lawson White)

6.6. Rachel Donelson m. William Eastin

6.6.1 Mary Eastin m. Lucius Junius Polk, (Note: Older brother of Leonidas Polk) eight children

6.6.2. Elizabeth Donelson Eastin m. Samuel Rucker Donelson [10.6.]

6.6.3. John Donelson Eastin

6.6.4. Rachel Jackson Eastin

6.7. Mary Donelson m. John Coffee

6.7.1. Mary Donelson Coffee m. Andrew Jackson Hutchings [3.1.1]

6.7.2. John Donelson Coffee m. Mary Narcissa Brahan; (Note: Daughter of John Brahan, granddaughter of Robert Weakley) had granddaughters Mary Percy Coffee Long, and Sarah Donelson Coffee, of Memphis

6.7.3. Elizabeth Graves Coffee

6.7.4. Andrew Jackson Coffee m. Elizabeth Hutchings [3.9.2.]; West Point appointment during Jackson's presidency; Andrew Jackson bequeathed him a sword; officer in the Mexican-American War, government surveyor in California in the 1850s, settled there and died in Oakland

6.7.4.1. Kate Coffee m. Charles J. McDougal; she kept the Mare Island Lighthouse for 35 years and raised four children there

6.7.4.2. Susan Coffee m. Lewis C. Heilner, U.S. Navy

6.7.4.2.1. Katherine Heilner m. Ray Strath MacDonald; Katherine H. MacDonald was an artist

6.7.4.2.1.1. Ray Strath MacDonald II

6.7.4.3. John Coffee

6.7.4.4. Frank L. Coffee

6.7.4.5. Andrew J. Coffee Jr.

6.7.5. Alexander Donelson Coffee m. (a) Ann E. Sloss (b). Mrs. Camilla Madding Jones; Coffee was an Alabama cotton plantation, factory owner, and captain in Confederate States Army

6.7.5a.1. Mary Coffee m. (a) Edward A. O'Neal Jr. (Note: O'Neal was the son of Alabama Governor Edward A. O'Neal) (b) Campbell

6.7.5a.1.1. Edward O'Neal III

6.7.5b.1. Eliza Coffee

6.7.6. Rachel Jackson Coffee m. A. J. Dyas; the Tennessee State Library and Archives holds the Dyas collection of Coffee family manuscripts

6.7.6.1. Robert Dyas

6.7.6.2. Alex. J. Dyas; lived at Asheville, North Carolina

6.7.6.2.1. Rachel Dyas

6.7.6.2.2. Hammond Dyas

6.7.6.2.3. Alexander J. Dyas

6.7.6.2.4. John Dyas

6.7.7. Katherine Coffee

6.7.8. Emily Coffee, died in childhood

6.7.9. William Coffee m. Virginia Malone; Confederate Army officer; had a grandson, Charles A. Nye of Texas

6.7.10. Joshua Coffee

6.8. William "Billey" Donelson m. (a) Rachel Donelson [10.2], (b) Elizabeth Anderson, (c) Martha Anderson

6.9. Elizabeth Donelson m. John Christmas McLemore, surveyor and land speculator

6.9.1. Mary McLemore

6.9.2. Andrew Jackson McLemore

6.10. Catherine Donelson m. James Glasgow Martin (James Glasgow Martin's mother Elizabeth Glasgow was married first to Stockley Donelson, second to John Anderson, third to John Martin); the Maj. John G. Martin plantation was called Clifton

6.10.1. Elizabeth Anderson Martin m. (a) Meriwether Lewis Randolph, (Note: Son of Thomas Mann Randolph and Martha Jefferson (daughter of Thomas Jefferson)) (b) Andrew Jackson Donelson [8.2]; Andrew Jackson appointed Randolph to be secretary of Arkansas Territory

6.10.1a.1. Lewis Jackson Randolph, died in childhood

6.10.2. James Glasgow Martin II m. Mary Donelson [8.3.?. ]

6.10.3. Catherine Donelson Martin

6.10.4. Mary Donelson Martin m. Robert B. Currey

6.10.5. Emily Donelson Martin m. George W. Currey

6.10.6. Rachel Jackson Martin

6.10.7. John Donelson Martin, killed at Shiloh

6.10.7.1. John Donelson Martin

6.10.7.1.1. John Donelson Martin

6.10.8. Andrew Jackson Martin m. Anna Nye

6.11. Chesed Purnell Donelson

6.12. Stockley Donelson m. Phila Ann Lawrence; builders of Cleveland Hall; "family of beautiful daughters"

6.12.1. John Lawrence Donelson

6.12.4. Emily Donelson m. (a) John E. Boddie, (b) William Walton, wrote Autobiography of Emily Donelson Walton

6.13. Emily Tennessee Donelson m. Andrew Jackson Donelson [8.2]

7. William Donelson m. Charity Dickerson; remembered as a "very wealthy man," he lived in the vicinity of Dry Creek and Mansker's Creek; was trained as a surveyor; in 1790 Andrew Jackson stood surety for W. Donelson for £1500; "Robert Weakley, in later years, told Lyman Draper about a meeting held in 1794 at Colonel William Donelson's...'to concert measures for a campaign against Nickajack,'" commissioned lieutenant colonel of Davidson County militia in October 1794; commissioned justice of Davidson County Court of Pleas and Quarter Sessions in August 1796

7.1. Mary Donelson m. Dr. Hamblen

7.2. Severn Donelson

7.3. Jacob Donelson

7.4. Martha H. Donelson m. Robert Minns Burton

7.6. Milberry Donelson m. John McGregor

7.6.4. Donelson McGregor, killed at the Battle of Murfreesboro

7.7. Andrew Jackson Donelson, of Louisiana

7.8. Elizabeth Hays Donelson

7.9. Rachel Donelson

7.10. Alexander S. Donelson

7.11. William Donelson II

7.?. I. D. Donelson, of Mississippi

7.?. Others, married Bartons

8. Samuel Donelson m. Mary "Polly" Smith; (Note: Daughter of U.S. Senator Daniel Smith Andrew Jackson helped the couple elope and father Smith was mad) lawyer and businessman; in 1795 he co-owned a store with Jackson; licensed to practice in county courts of Southwest Territory in November 1794 and superior court in December 1795; appointed "attorney for the territory pro hac vice, Mero District," in May 1795 and May 1796 (both due to absence of Jackson), and again in November 1796 and May 1797; appointed Davidson County solicitor in Davidson County Court of Pleas and Quarter Sessions in 1795–1797, same job but Robertson county in July 1796; licensed to practice law in Tennessee courts in July 1796; resigned as Sumner County solicitor in April 1798; he was heavily involved in land speculation before his sudden illness and death in 1804; Jackson was an executor of his estate and guardian of his surviving sons; Polly Smith's second husband James Sanders and Andrew Jackson did not get along;

8.1. John Samuel Donelson, served with Jackson in Creek War, worked as a surveyor, died of illness 1817

8.2. Andrew Jackson Donelson m. (a) Emily Tennessee Donelson [6.13], (b) Elizabeth Anderson Martin Randolph [6.10.1]; Donelson served with Jackson in First Seminole War; J. F. H. Claiborne was quite scathing about A. J. Donelson, describing him as "a shallow, self-important personage, who was in his native element when engaged in petty intrigue" and a "weak man, inflated with conceit, whose whole importance flowed from his proximity to Jackson."

8.2a.1. Andrew Jackson Donelson II, attended West Point, U.S. Army Corps of Engineers, died of illness in Memphis

8.2a.?. Mary Rachel Donelson?

8.2a.?. John Samuel Donelson, "commanded Hickory Rifles" in Confederate States Army, killed battle of Chickamauga

8.2a.?. Mary Emily Donelson m. John Alexander Wilcox; Mary Emily Donelson Wilcox wrote about the Donelson–Jackson family in the 1890s; Wilcox was a Mississippi Congressman; he died of heart trouble during the American Civil War

8.2a.?.1. Andrew Donelson Wilcox

8.2a.?.1.1. Pauline Wilcox m. Burke, wrote Emily Donelson of Tennessee

8.2a.4. Rachel Jackson Donelson m. William B. Knox

8.2b.1. Daniel S. Donelson, a Confederate Inspector General during Siege of Vicksburg; murdered in Mississippi in 1864, apparently by bushwackwers

8.2b.2. Martin Donelson

8.2b.3. William Alexander Donelson, murdered in Davidson County in 1900

8.2b.4. Catherine "Katie" Donelson, died at 18 of "inflammation of the brain"

8.2b.5. Vinet Donelson

8.2b.6. Lewis Randolph Donelson

8.2b.7. Rosa Elizabeth Donelson, died in infancy

8.2b.8. Andrew Jackson Donelson

8.3. Daniel Smith Donelson m. Margaret Branch; (Note: Daughter of Secretary of the Navy John Branch) Major General in Confederate Army

8.3.?. Mary Donelson m. James Glasgow Martin II [6.10.2.]

9. Rachel Donelson m. (a) Lewis Robards, (b) Andrew Jackson

9b.1. Andrew Jackson Jr. [born as 10.4.] m. Sarah Yorke Jackson; Sarah Yorke Jackson's widowed sister Marion Yorke Adams and her three children lived at the Hermitage, Adams staying until her death in 1877

9b.1.1. Rachel Jackson m. Dr. John M. Lawrence, nine children

9b.1.2. Andrew Jackson III m. Amy Rich; Andrew Jackson bequeathed him a sword; colonel in Confederate States Army

9b.1.2.1. Andrew Jackson IV

9b.1.2.2. Albert Marble Jackson

9b.1.3. Thomas Jackson, died in infancy

9b.1.4. Samuel Jackson, lieutenant in Confederate States Army, died from wounds received at Chickamauga

9b.1.5. Robert Jackson, died in infancy

10. Severn Donelson m. Elizabeth Rucker; Severn Donelson was "severely" wounded by what was likely a "friendly fire" shooting during James Robertson's Nickajack Expedition against the Cherokees; he was said to be "fond of a dram and took several every day"; according to big sister Rachel Donelson Jackson, he died of "dropsy of the chest" in 1818.

10.1. Rachel Donelson m. William Donelson [6.8]; Rachel died the day of A.J. Donelson's wedding to Emily Tennessee Donelson

10.2. John Donelson

10.3. James Rucker Donelson

10.4. Andrew Jackson Jr. [adopted as 9b.1.]

10.5. Thomas J. Donelson [twin of 10.4] m. Emma Yorke Farquhar (Note: Emma Yorke Farquar was a first cousin of Sarah Yorke, the wife of Andrew Jackson Jr. (who was Thomas J. Donelson's twin); Sarah's parents Peter and Mary (Haines) Yorke died when she was a child, and she and her two sisters was raised by their paternal aunts Elizabeth Yorke (Mrs. George Farquar) and Martha Yorke (Mrs. Mordecai Witherill).)

10.6. Samuel Rucker Donelson m. (a) Elizabeth Eastin [6.6.2.] (b) Jane Roysler

10.7. Lucinda O. Rucker Donelson m. George Washington Martin; Col. Martin was involved in registering land claims for the General Land Office in the 1830s; surveyed the 85-acre land claim of Puck-tish-nubbee, a dowager queen of the Choctaw, who "claimed the land under the provisions of the Treaty of Dancing Rabbit Creek;" the claim was later sold to William M. Gwin; U.S. Senator George Poindexter suggested that Martin (and future Mississippi historian J. F. H. Claiborne) may have been involved in some kind of land scandal in 1835

10.7.1. Andrew Jackson Martin

10.8. Alexander Donelson m. Kate Roysler

11. Leven Donelson (unmarried, no issue)

== See also ==
- Wards of Andrew Jackson
- Fighting Butlers

== Sources ==
- Caffery, Charles S. (n.d.). The Caffery Family, 1737–1900 (PDF). n.pub. OCLC 15049793.
- Crabb, Alfred Leland (1957). Journey to Nashville: A Story of the Founding. New York: Bobbs-Merrill.
- Cheathem, Mark R. (2007). Old Hickory's Nephew: The Political and Private Struggles of Andrew Jackson Donelson. Southern Biography Series. Baton Rouge: Louisiana State University Press. ISBN 978-0-8071-3238-8. LCCN 2006024951. OCLC 70866891. Project MUSE book 16672.
- ——— (2014). Andrew Jackson, Southerner. Baton Rouge, Louisiana: Louisiana State University Press. ISBN 978-0-8071-5099-3. LCCN 2012049695. OCLC 858995561. Project MUSE book 26506.
- Donelson, John (1779). "Journal of a voyage, intended by God's Permission, in the good Boat Adventure, from Fort Patrick Henry on Holston river to the French Salt Springs on Cumberland River, kept by John Donaldson" (PDF). Tennessee State Library and Archives.
- Drew, Bettina Lee (December 2001). Master Andrew Jackson: Indian Removal and the Culture of Slavery (Thesis). Yale University. UMI 3030759. ProQuest 3030759
- Ely, James W. Jr.; Brown, Theodore Jr., eds. (1987). Legal Papers of Andrew Jackson. Supplement to the Papers of Andrew Jackson. Knoxville, Tennessee: University of Tennessee Press. ISBN 978-0-87049-355-3. LCCN 82002635. OCLC 17590211.
- Gismondi, Melissa (June 12, 2017). Rachel Jackson and the Search for Zion, 1760s–1830s (PhD, History thesis). Charlottesville, Virginia: University of Virginia. doi:10.18130/v3q364.
- Inman, Natalie R. (2017). "4. The Donelsons: Social, Political, and Economic Expansion on the Frontier". Brothers and Friends: Kinship in Early America. Early American Spaces. University of Georgia Press. doi:10.1353/book51901. ISBN 978-0-8203-5110-0. LCCN 2016055415. OCLC 985105661.
- Rice, Cpt. Mark (n.d.). "Defending the ramparts: the United States Military Academy's struggle for survival in the age of Jackson". USMA Library. Tactical Officer Education Program. West Point, New York: United States Military Academy.
- Rohr, Nancy (Summer–Fall 2000). "Jackson's Victorious Return to Huntsville: One Fine Day". The Huntsville Historical Review. 27 (2) 1. Huntsville-Madison County Historical Society: 1–21. ISSN 1048-3152. OCLC 7993191 – via University of Alabama in Huntsville Digital Commons.
- Whitaker, A. P. (December 1926). "The Muscle Shoals Speculation, 1783–1789". The Mississippi Valley Historical Review. 13 (3): 365–386. doi:10.2307/1893112. JSTOR 1893112.
- "Alphabetical Locator of Graduates and Former Cadets" (PDF). west-point.org. 2010.
