= John Hutchings (slave trader) =

Andrew Jackson business partner (c. 1775–1817)

- Born: c. 1775
- Died: November 20, 1817; Huntsville, Alabama Territory
- Spouse: Polly Smith
- Parent(s): Thomas Hutchings; Catherine Donelson

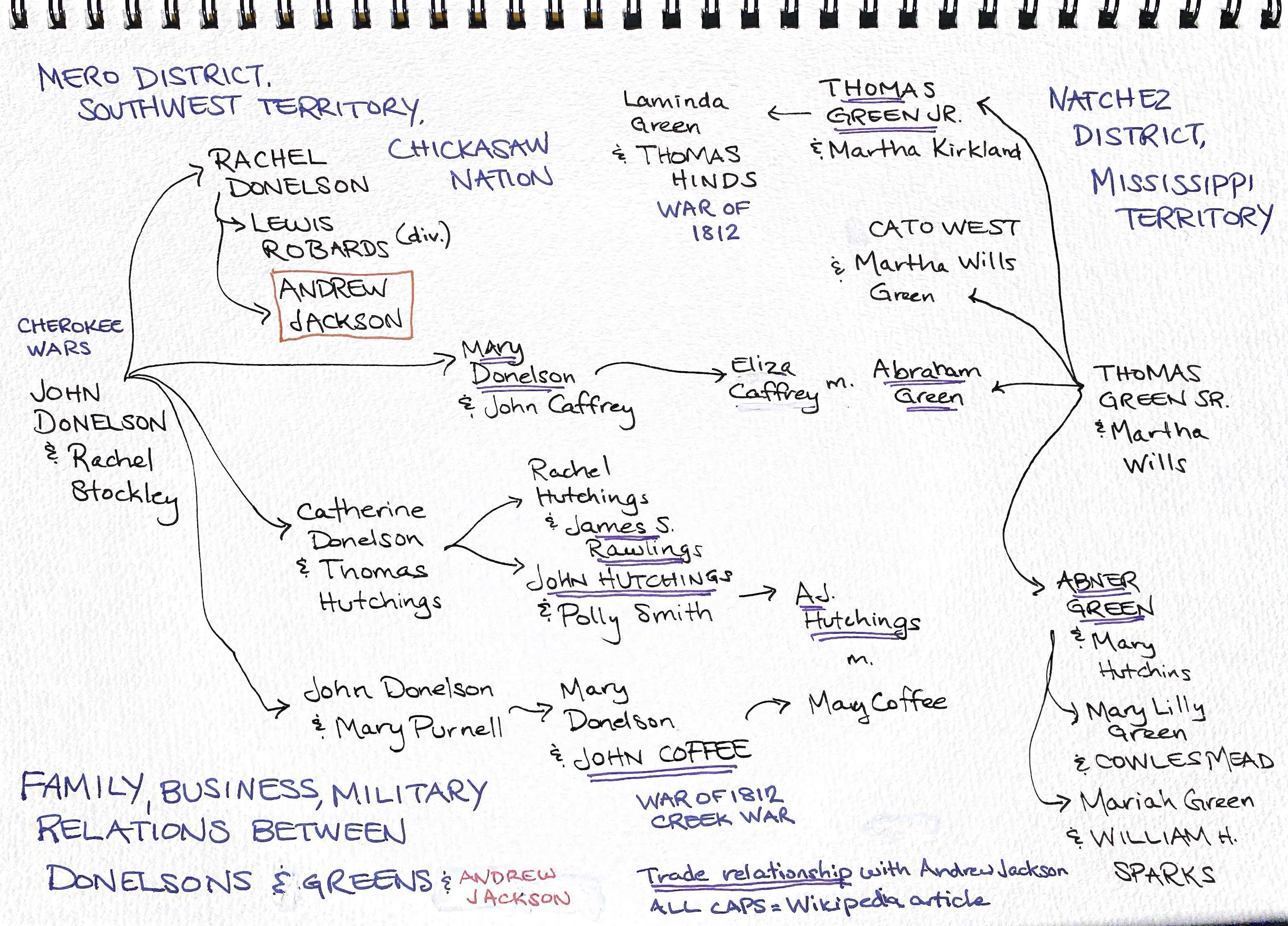
Hutchings was Jackson's wife's sister's son

John Hutchings (c. 1775 – November 20, 1817) was a nephew by marriage of American slave trader, militia leader, and U.S. president Andrew Jackson. He was Jackson's partner in his general stores, and his slave-trading operation.

== Biography ==
Hutchings was a son of Rachel Donelson Robards Jackson's older sister Catherine Donelson and her husband Thomas Hutchings. John Hutchings may have been known as "Jackey" to friends and family. He married a woman named Polly Smith, who was the niece of William Smith, who attended school with Andrew Jackson in the Carolinas and later became a U.S. Senator.

According to the editors of The Papers of Andrew Jackson, Hutchings was "Jackson's partner in the Lebanon, Gallatin, and Hunter's Hill stores." Surviving letters from William C. C. Claiborne and Hutchings himself show that they were regularly providing Jackson with updates on Hutchings' success in selling "negroes" and horses that he had brought down from Tennessee to Mississippi. Claiborne wrote to Jackson in 1801, "I can assure you, with great truth, that Mr. Hutchings is a prudent, amiable young man, & is very attentive to your Interest." On Christmas Day 1801 Hutchings wrote Jackson with his own update, "I shall meet with no dificulty to sell the negres." A surviving letter from Hutchings to Jackson from an 1804 journey reporting on a journey from Stones River to New Orleans reads as follows:

Dear Sir: I this evening retched nashvill on my way to Orleans, after undergoing Some feteague. I had the misfortun of Sinking one of the Boates after being about half loaded. The Boate Sprung aleake in the Bow and'all we Could do She would go to Bot-to There was about Twenty or Twenty five Bales that got Wet. I gave them Two days sun before I put them on Board. I also have plased them on Top of the Boates. I was under the necessaty of taking the pubick Boate and was under the necessaty of Taking off Every plank all Round the gunwell.

The amount of Cotton is as follows:

- Cotton from Gallatin - 25,567
- Cotton from Hunters Hill – 16,346
- Cotton from Lebanon –14,148
- Total – 56,079

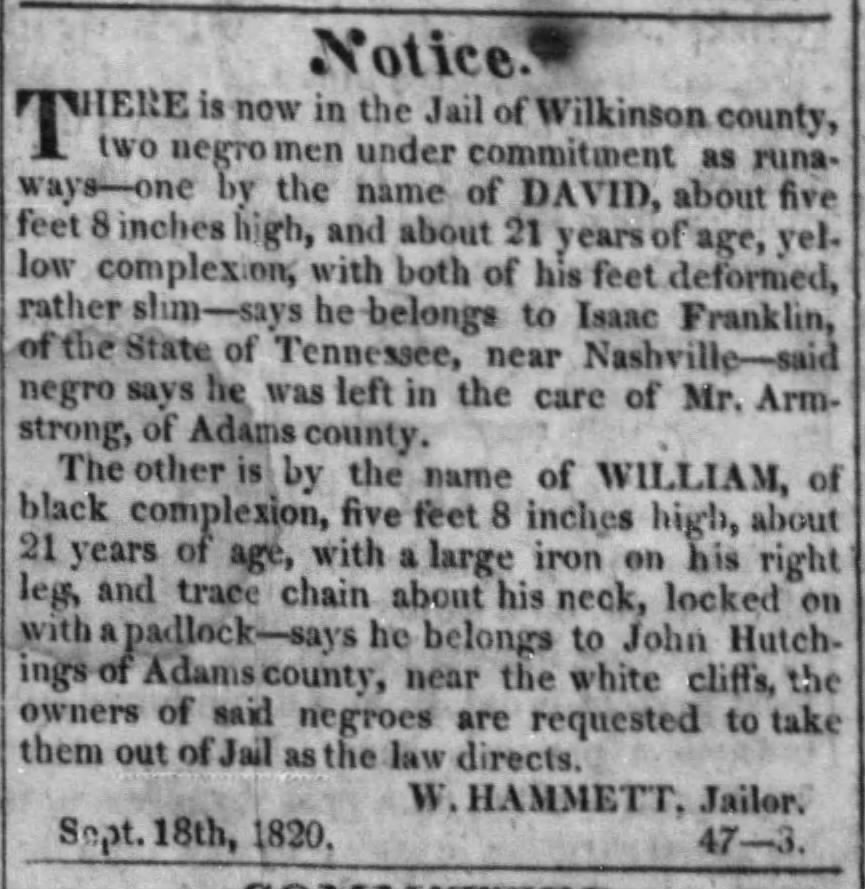
A 21-year-old named William, found in 1820 "with a large iron on his right leg, and trace chain about his neck, locked on by a padlock," claimed his legal owner was John Hutchings of Adams County, "near the White Cliffs." (Note: The other captured slave listed in this ad claimed his legal owner was Isaac Franklin.)

In January 1805 he was a signatory to a petition protesting the court-martial of Thomas Butler, probably produced at the behest of Andrew Jackson and sent to Thomas Jefferson's government, recorded in official state papers under the title "Disobedience of Orders Justified on the Grounds of Illegality." In 1811, Jackson wrote his wife Rachel from Natchez about his work with a coffle of slaves that, "My trusty friend John Hutchings, on the recpt of my letter had come down to this place recd. all the negroes on hand and had carried them up to his farm..."

During the War of 1812 he was captain of Second Regiment of the Tennessee Mounted Volunteer Gunmen; one of the sergeants in his regiment was Archibald Yell. During the fiercely contested 1828 presidential election, an opponent of Jackson editorialized about Hutchings possibly receiving preferential treatment and an unearned officer's commission during the War of 1812, asking, "Was not your nephew Capt. John Hutchings mustered into service (as Captain) the 1st October, 1814, and did he not immediately leave the service, and return home to attend your race horses, or his own, and never again joined the Army until after the battle of N. Orleans, of about that time, and all this with your knowledge and consent?"

According to a finding aid to historic letters held at the University of Michigan Libraries, in 1816, Jackson wrote to William C. Crawford "regarding supplies for the treaty to be held with the Chickasaw Nation. Appointing John Hutchings as an agent to acquire the supplies to avoid 'the evil that May arise from assembling the Indians without being prepared to administer to their wants.'" John Hutchings & Co. was thus then the official government purveyor of "Two boxes of Claret" and "One barrel of Good Whiskey" for the convention of the southern tribes at the house of George Colbert in September 1816 that yielded the Treaty of Turkeytown and the Treaty of the Chickasaw Council House.

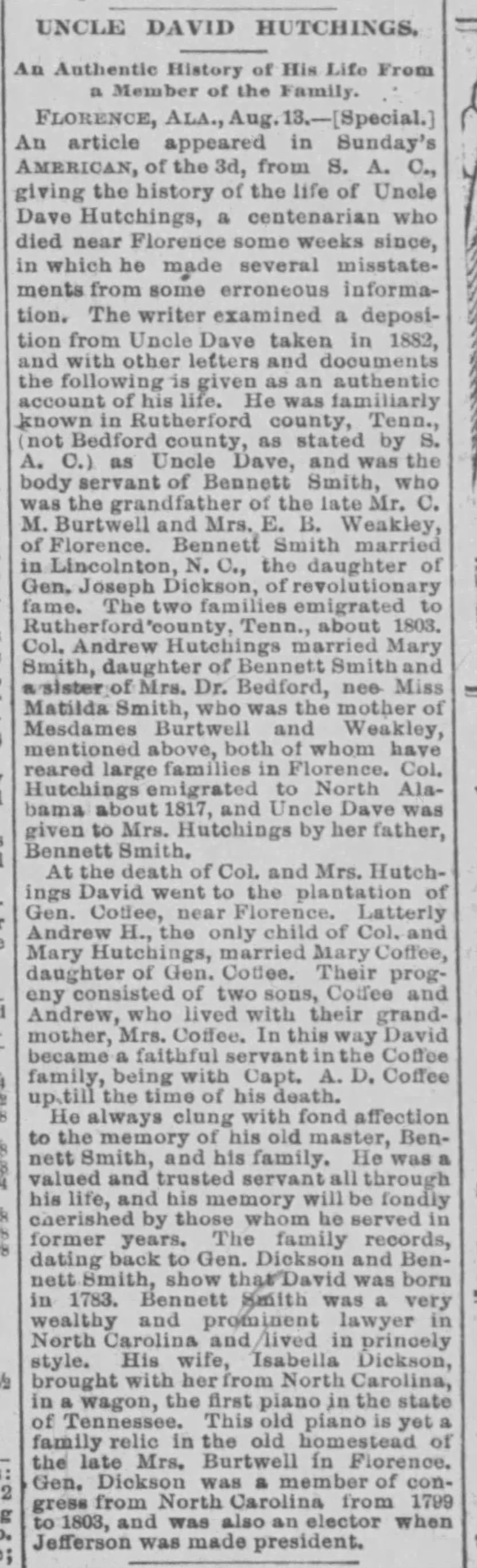
"Uncle Dave Hutchings" The Tennessean, August 14, 1890

=== Alabama ===
According to the Tennessee State Library and Archives, which holds a collection of Hutchings family papers, "Jackson and Hutchings acquired large tracts of land near Milton's Bluff and in northern Alabama near Florence. Sometime after the Treaty of Fort Jackson (1814), Hutchings moved to Huntsville where he maintained a large plantation."

John Hutchings married Mary Smith, who was the niece of William Smith, a U.S. Senator from South Carolina. William Smith built a house in Huntsville in 1833.

Hutchings fell ill in 1817. In June 1817 Andrew Jackson wrote to his wife Rachel Jackson from Huntsville, "I was at the Bluff Two days & nights, Major Hutchings deserves a Meddle—he has the finest Prospect of a good crop I ever saw, his cotton far excells any crop I have seen, & I think we may calculate, on, from Eighty, to Ninety Bales—he will be in, perhaps before I return he has a bad cough, I have urged him to come in & apply proper remedies for it". On October 22, 1817, Andrew and Rachel Jackson arrived in Huntsville to attend his sickbed. A. J. Hutchings was already with them—he had been staying at the Hermitage—and Andrew Jackson became his legal guardian. Hutchings is buried about 20 miles northeast of Athens, Alabama, under a marker commissioned by Jackson that reads:

"Beneath This Marble Slab
Rests the Remains of
John Hutchings.
He Died on the 20th
Day of November, 1817,
Aged 42 Years.
Death is But the Dawn
Of Life Immortal."

In 1818, the firm of Brahan & Hutchings of Huntsville, Alabama was cited as a reference in an advertisement for a commission merchant in Lexington, Kentucky. John Brahan was a pioneer settler of Huntsville who was considering buying property from Andrew Jackson before he was accused of embezzling government money from the land office just prior to the Panic of 1819.

== A. J. Hutchings ==
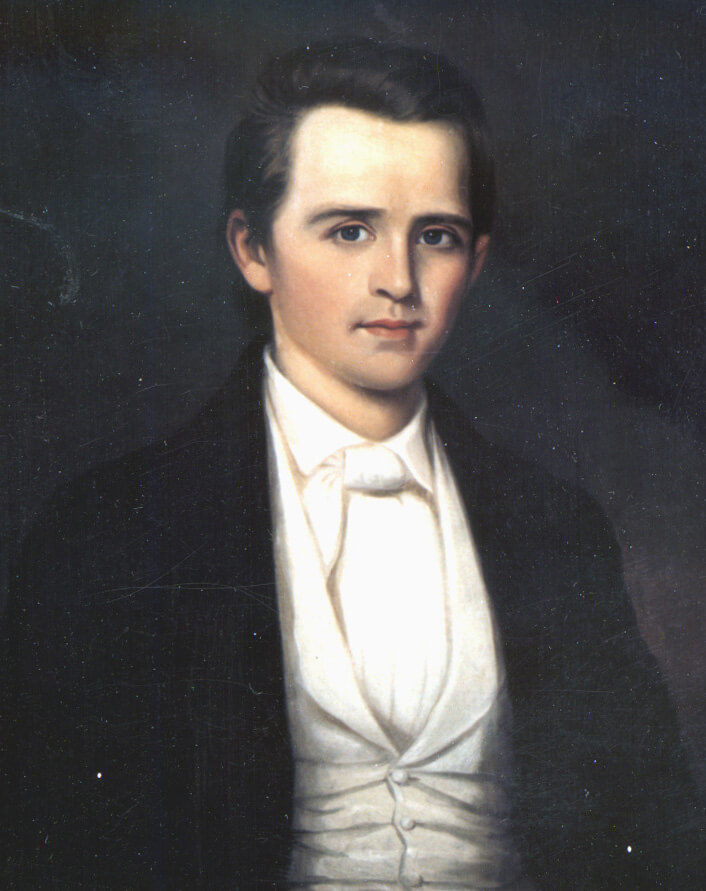
Andrew Jackson Hutchings (1815–1841)

Andrew Jackson became the guardian of John and Polly Hutchings' orphaned son, Andrew Jackson Hutchings, and he lived for some time at the Hermitage. However, according to the Tennessee State Library and Archives, Jackson's "public duties occupied so much of his time that young Hutchings spent most of his guardianship under the supervision of General John Coffee at Hickory Hill, the Coffee plantation near Florence, Alabama."

According to Harriet Chappell Owsley this was Hutchings' dying wish. Andrew and Rachel Jackson traveled to Alabama to sit at Hutchings' deathbed; their trusted slave Hannah Jackson watched the Jacksons' adopted sons Andrew Jackson Jr. and Lyncoya Jackson while they were gone.

Hutchings was educated at the Hermitage alongside Andrew Jackson Jr. and Lyncoya Jackson. He joined his cousins Andrew Jackson Jr., Samuel Jackson Hays, and Daniel Donelson in Washington in October 1829 during the first year of Jackson's presidency. He eventually married Mary Coffee, a cousin and a daughter of Jackson's longtime ally John Coffee.

In March 1818, James C. Bronaugh and merchant banker James Jackson bought a section of land at the Huntsville public land sales for A. J. Hutchings, an orphaned grandnephew and ward of Jackson. The couple settled on a plantation that "Coffee had bought for him, on Jackson's instructions, at the 1818 land sales. This plantation was located on what was then the Coulter's Landing Road, but which is now known as the Gunwaleford Road, about four miles west of Florence." Andrew Jackson wrote to A. J. Hutchings frequently and advised him on matters business and personal. There is a surviving letter from Andrew Jackson to A. J. Hutchings advising him, "If you get in debt you will be a slave."

In 1838 A. J. Hutchings placed a runaway slave ad looking for "Ranaway, George Winston, two of his upper fore teeth out immediately in front." This ad was reprinted in American Slavery As It Is in 1839. Andrew Jackson Hutchings died in 1841. A. J. and Mary Coffee Hutchings had four children together, only one of whom survived to adulthood, dying in 1863. Their sons, Andrew Hutchings and Coffee Hutchings, lived with their maternal grandmother Mary Donelson Coffee after the death of their parents.

An enslaved man named Dave Hutchings, who had originally been attached to the family of Bennett Smith of North Carolina, lived with the family for a time.

== See also ==
- Wards of Andrew Jackson
- Donelson family
- Early career of Andrew Jackson
- Andrew Jackson and land speculation

== Sources ==
- Rice, Turner (1975a). "Andrew Jackson and His Northwest Alabama Interests". Journal of Muscle Shoals History. 3. University of North Alabama. Florence, Alabama: Tennessee Valley Historical Society: 3–12. ISSN 0094-8039. LCCN 74646773. OCLC 1795446.
- Jackson, Andrew (1994). Moser, Harold D.; Hoth, David R.; Hoemann, George H. (eds.). The Papers of Andrew Jackson: Volume IV, 1816–1820. University of Tennessee Press. doi:10.7290/utp8684. ISBN 978-0-8704-9219-8.
