= Wards of Andrew Jackson =

Nephews, nieces, and children of friends

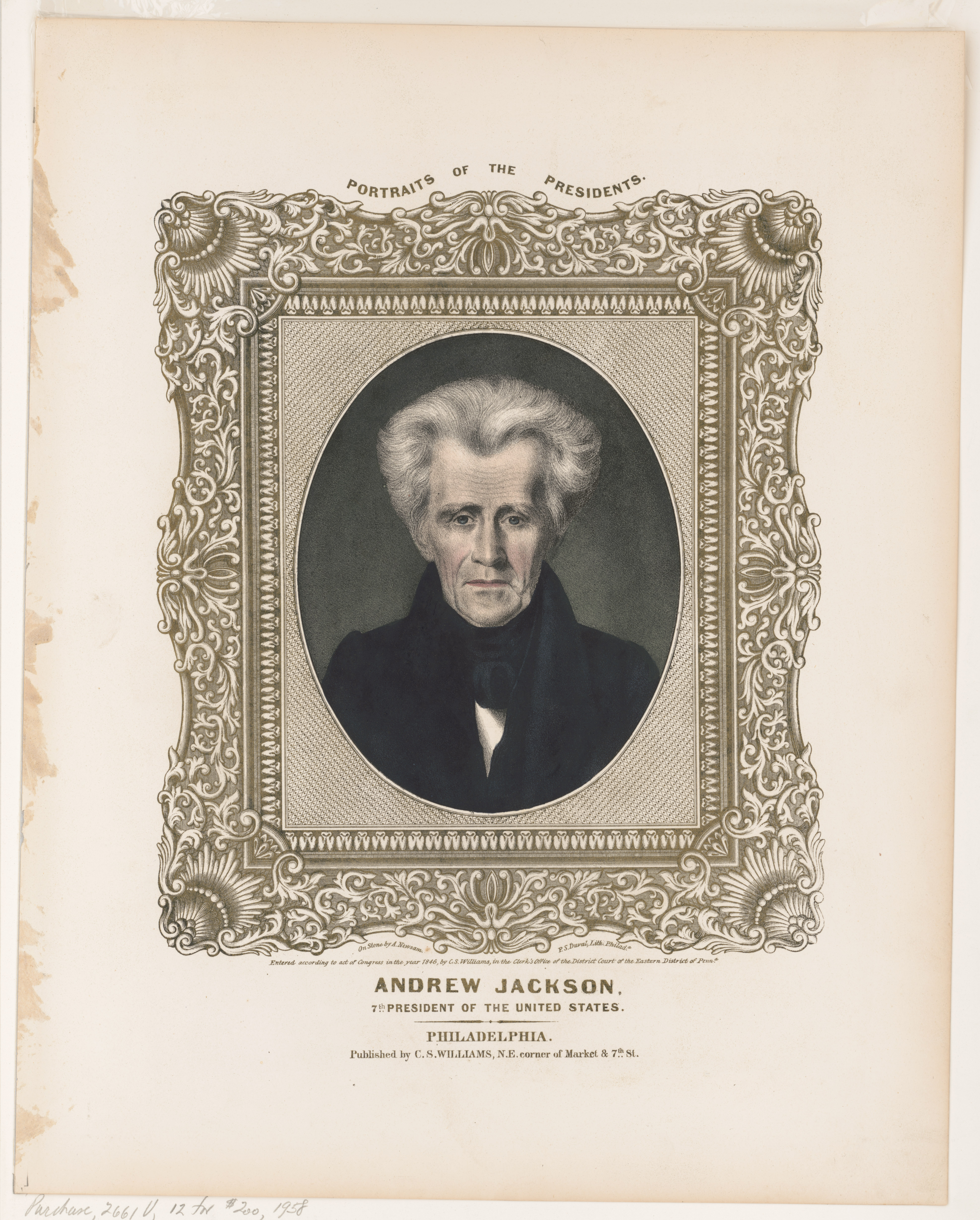
1846 lithograph of Jackson

This is a list of people for whom Andrew Jackson, seventh U.S. president, acted as pater familias or served as a guardian, legal or otherwise. Andrew and Rachel Donelson Jackson had no biological children together. As Tennessee history writer Stanley Horn put it in 1938, "Jackson's friends had a habit of dying, and leaving their orphans to his care." As Jackson biographer Robert V. Remini wrote in 1977, "The list of Jackson's wards is almost endless...new names turn up with fresh examination." There was no comprehensive index of the wards until Rachel Meredith's 2013 master's thesis. Historian Harriet Chappell Owsley commented in 1982, "It would make an interesting study to follow each of Jackson's wards by means of their correspondence with him but this would require a book instead of an article as the correspondence is voluminous." (Owsley was writing about A. J. Donelson, who has since been the subject of a full-length book; Donelson was Jackson's private secretary during his presidency and was himself a vice-presidential candidate on the Know-Nothing ticket in 1856; William O. Butler, who was not a ward but was very entangled with many of them by kinship ties, was a vice-presidential candidate on the Democratic ticket in the 1848 presidential election.) Part of the reason the wards are such a presence in his correspondence, according to historian Mark R. Cheathem, is that "Much of Jackson's adult life was spent managing his nephews and adopted son."

Connections to blood relatives, extended periodically by marriage, were source of political and social power in the antebellum U.S. south. Jackson, through his kinship network, including the nephews and wards, led one of the major families competing for control over Tennessee politics in the 1810s through the 1830s. According to a study of Irish-American traders (like Jackson) working in colonial-era Mississippi River valley (like Jackson), "...after this first wave of migrants established themselves along the Gulf Coast, it was not uncommon for them to send for extended kin to join their firms. Nephews...who would not have inherited family estates...were a specific target of such encouragement." To some extent Jackson created a household out of "self-selected kin...young men whom Jackson collected...whom he put to work promoting his and their careers at once." In some cases the ward-guardian relationship was informal, in other cases, Jackson had been designated executor and guardian of minor children by a deceased relative or compatriot; a 1979 study of slaveholding Natchez elites stated that "administration of estates was often an important adjunct to business activity."

Some of Jackson's wards would have lived at Hunter's Hill, and others would have grown up at what is now called the "Log Hermitage," which was originally a two-story blockhouse and was later converted for use as a slave cabin.

== B ==
- Anthony Wayne Butler - Son of Edward Butler, one of the Five Fighting Butlers of the American Revolutionary War, he attended Yale University, and died of illness while at sea. Edward Butler owned a plantation near Nashville and he and his brother Thomas "struck up a warm friendship" with neighbor Jackson. Edward Butler died in 1803 and Jackson became guardian to his children.
- Caroline Swanwick Butler Bell - Daughter of Edward Butler, she married Robert Bell and moved to Louisiana.

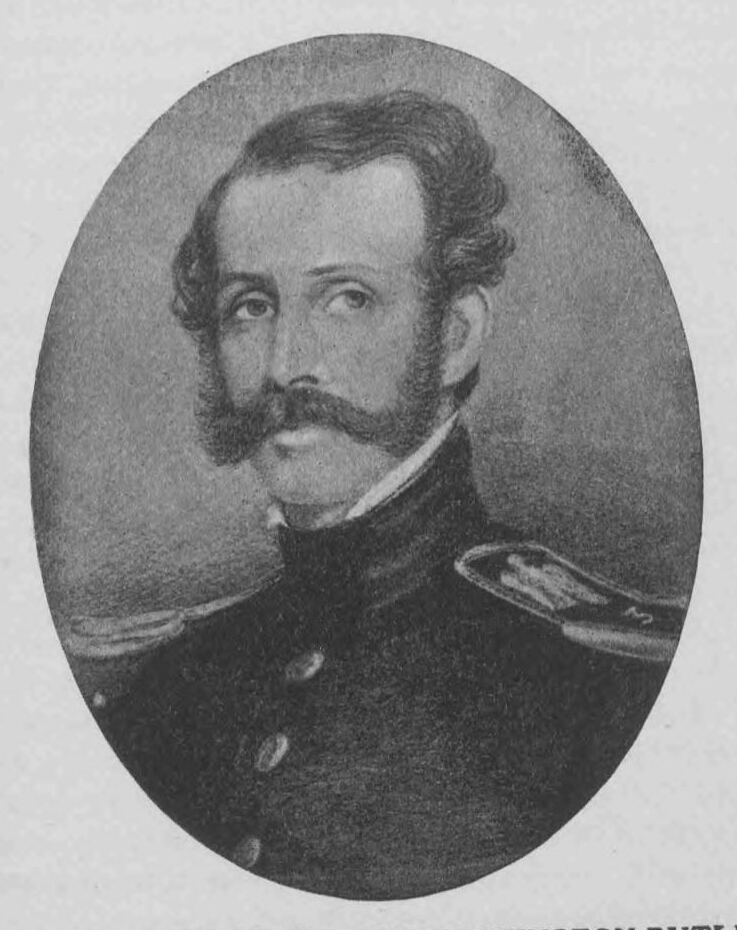
Col. Edward George Washington Butler (1800–1888)

- Edward George Washington Butler - One of Edward Butler's children, West Point class of 1820, married a great-granddaughter of Martha Washington, became a major sugar planter in Iberville Parish, Louisiana; Butler was very attached to Jackson and they corresponded frequently
- Eliza Eleanor Butler - A daughter of Edward Butler, she married John Donelson IV, a nephew of Rachel and Andrew Jackson.
- Lydia Butler Hays - She was born in March 1788, and died 1852. Daughter of Thomas Butler, another of the Five Fighting Butlers, and thus niece of Edward Butler. Thomas Butler held a high rank in the U.S. Army and in 1797 "he was transferred to Tennessee, where he was charged with negotiating treaties and preventing squatters from encroaching on Indian lands." He was court-martialed for being out of regulation not once, but twice, and died of yellow fever in 1805 before his sentence could be carried out. Lydia Butler married Stockley Donelson Hays (see Hays wards below), who was a nephew of Andrew Jackson by Rachel's sister Jane Donelson Hays and worked closely with Andrew Jackson on various enterprises. They had two children.

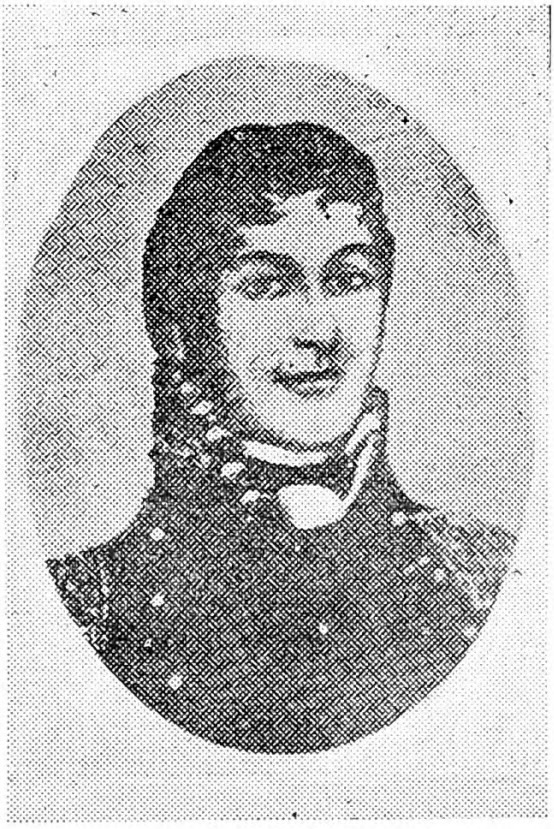
Robert Butler (born Dec. 25, 1786), served as an adjutant general and Jackson's chief of staff in the War of 1812

- Robert Butler - Son of Thomas Butler, another of the Five Fighting Butlers, and thus nephew of Edward Butler, he married Rachel Hays (see below) According to a history of Louisiana plantation families, "Robert Butler was chief of staff to Gen. Andrew Jackson throughout the War of 1812." He was secretary for the 1818 Treaty of Tuscaloosa with the Chickasaw. He was later surveyor-general of Florida.
- Thomas Butler Jr. - Son of Thomas Butler, nephew of Edward Butler, already a legal adult when Jackson was asked to look out for him
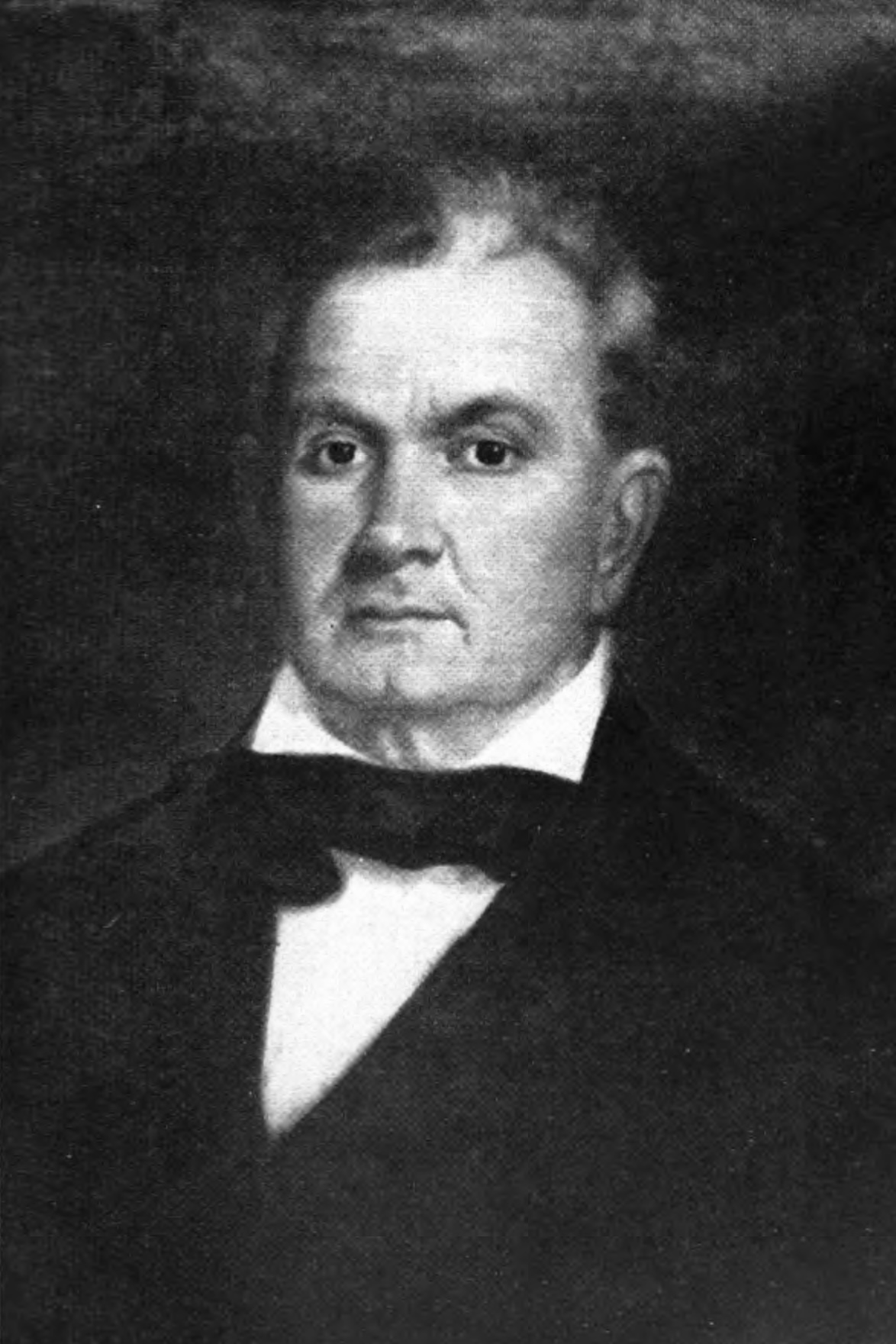
  William Edward Butler (1790–1882), "the father of Jackson, Tennessee"
- Dr. William Edward Butler - Son of Thomas Butler, nephew of Edward Butler, not properly a ward but part of the kinship network; he married Martha Thompson "Patsy" Hays, sister of Stockley Donelson Hays and Samuel Jackson Hays (see below); Butler was a power in the western part of Tennessee that opened up following the 1818 treaty with the Chickasaw

== C ==
- Charley - Indigenous baby or child taken as a prisoner of war during the War of 1812 and sent to the Hermitage; there is no known documentary record indicating what became of Charley
- William Ferdinand Claiborne - After Thomas Augustine Claiborne and Sarah Claiborne died, Jackson became W. F. Claiborne's guardian. Sarah Lewis, the oldest daughter of Jackson's business associate William T. Lewis (see also the Lewis sisters below), married T. A. Claiborne (a brother of Mississippi Territory public officials Ferdinand L. Claiborne and William C. C. Claiborne, and Virginia congressman Nathaniel Claiborne). T. A. Claiborne, served as secretary to the 1805 Treaty of the Chickasaw Nation. Thomas Augustine Claiborne died in the early 1830s.
- Micajah Lewis Claiborne - After Thomas and Sarah Claiborne died, at least one source indicates that Jackson became Micajah Claiborne's guardian. Claiborne became an officer in the U.S. Navy and had duty in the Opium Wars and in the Mexican-American War. Micajah Lewis Claiborne was probably named for his mother's brother, Micajah Green Lewis, a graduate of Princeton University who went to work for his uncle Governor Claiborne and who was killed in a duel with political opponent Robert Sterry in 1805.

== D ==
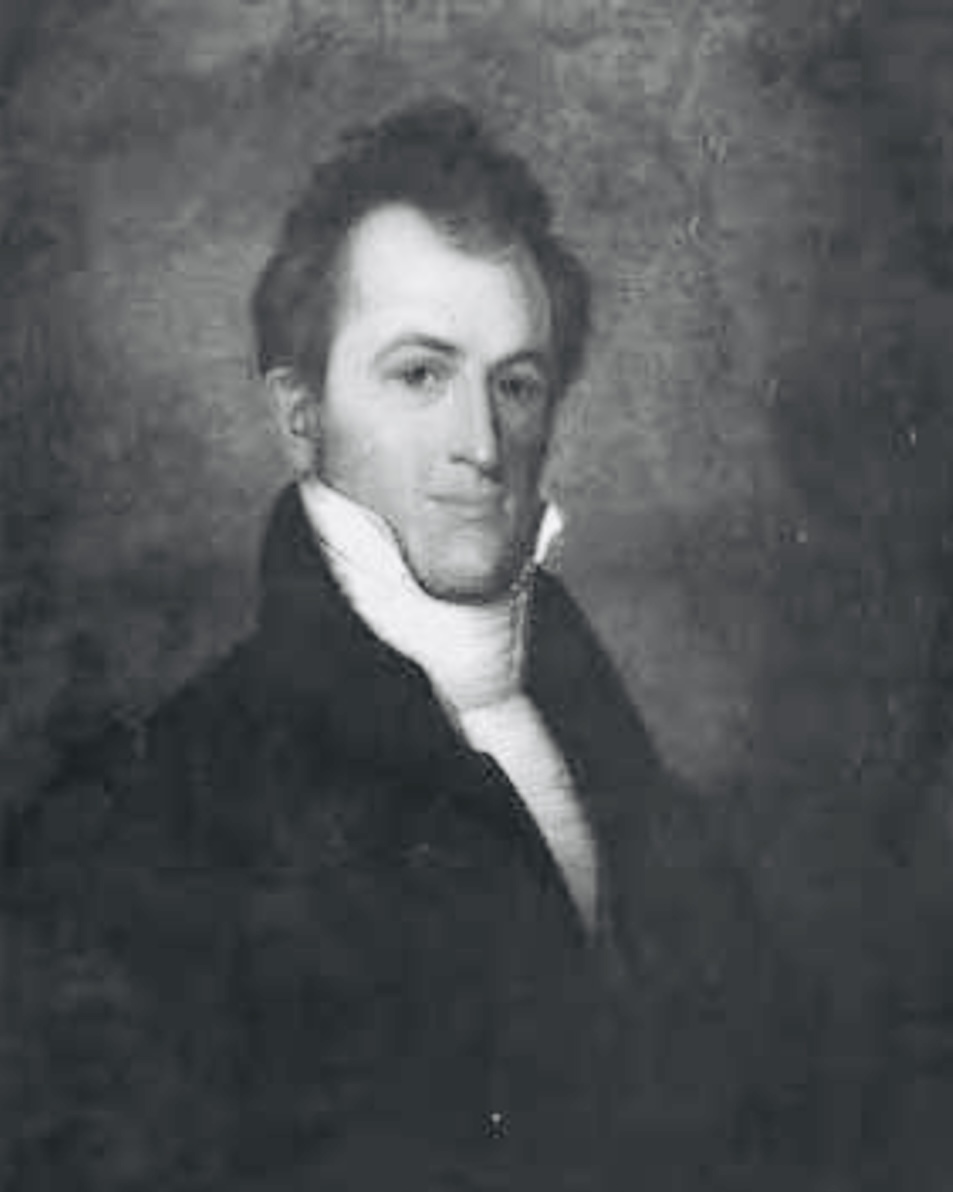
Andrew Jackson Donelson (1799–1871)

- Andrew Jackson Donelson - Biological son of Rachel's brother Samuel Donelson, who had died sometime in the first decade of the 1800s; family tradition had it that the dying Donelson asked Jackson to be guardian to his children. (Jackson was also appointed executor of the indebted estate.) A. J. Donelson, one of "the three Andrews" who lived at Hermitage, attended Cumberland College, graduated from West Point class of 1820, and studied law at Transylvania University. He ultimately became one of Jackson's major political protégés, and his wife served as an Acting First Lady until the Eaton Affair got in the way.
- John Samuel Donelson - Oldest biological son of Samuel Donelson. His mother remarried; and there is a suggestion of strife between both John Samuel Donelson and his new stepfather, James Sanders, and between the new stepfather and Andrew Jackson. The sons of Samuel Donelson lived at least part-time at the Hermitage and ultimately became estranged from their mother. John Samuel Donelson served in Jackson's militia in the Creek War and died of illness in 1817.

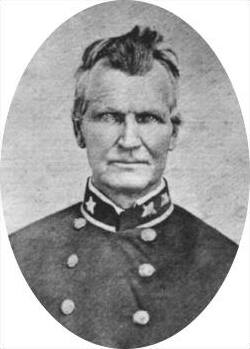
Major General (CSA) Daniel Smith Donelson (1801–1863)

- Daniel Smith Donelson - Youngest biological son of Samuel Donelson, and named for his maternal grandfather, U.S. Senator Daniel Smith, with whom he lived part-time. West Point class of 1825, married a daughter of Governor–Senator–Secretary of the Navy John Branch, was a Tennessee state legislator, served as an officer in the Confederate States Army and died of illness in 1863
- Milberry M. Donelson - A niece of Rachel's via her brother William Donelson, she served as Rachel's "companion in the early 1820s," then got married and had six children before she died at age 30 in 1836.

== E ==
- Mary Ann Eastin - A grand-niece by way of Rachel's brother John Donelson through his daughter Rachel Donelson Eastin, she married Lucius Junius Polk (brother of Confederate general Leonidas Polk and second cousin of President James K. Polk) at the White House during Jackson's presidency, and later left Washington consequent to Jackson's stubborn defense of the chastity of Peggy Eaton.

== H ==
- Andrew Hays - Son of Nashville pioneer Samuel Hays, "a signer of the Cumberland Compact, who was killed outside John Donelson's house by Indians in 1793." These children were most likely raised by their surviving mother Elizabeth, but Jackson did manage the estate's finances and as attorney won a judgement in favor of the estate in a lawsuit decided in 1805. Hays was named a captain of the Madison County militia in 1822. Andrew Hays was later the prosecutor in the case of the death of Gilbert, a slave owned by Andrew Jackson. In 1835 he participated in a Nashville committee supporting the nomination of Martin Van Buren to be president.
- Campbell Hays - Son of Samuel Hays
- Charles Hays - Son of Samuel Hays
- Hugh Hays - Son of Samuel Hays
- Jane Gillespie Hays - Daughter of another pioneer Hays, Nathaniel Hays. When her parents died, Jackson indicated a willingness to take her in. Jackson bought the Hermitage property from Nathaniel Hays.
- Rachel Hays - Niece of the Jacksons, daughter of Robert Hays and Jane (Donelson) Hays. Married to Robert Butler (see above); the couple settled in the newly opened Florida Territory in 1824.
- Narcissa Hays - Niece of the Jacksons, daughter of Robert and Jane (Donelson) Hays. Traveled with her sister Rachel and the Jacksons, never married.

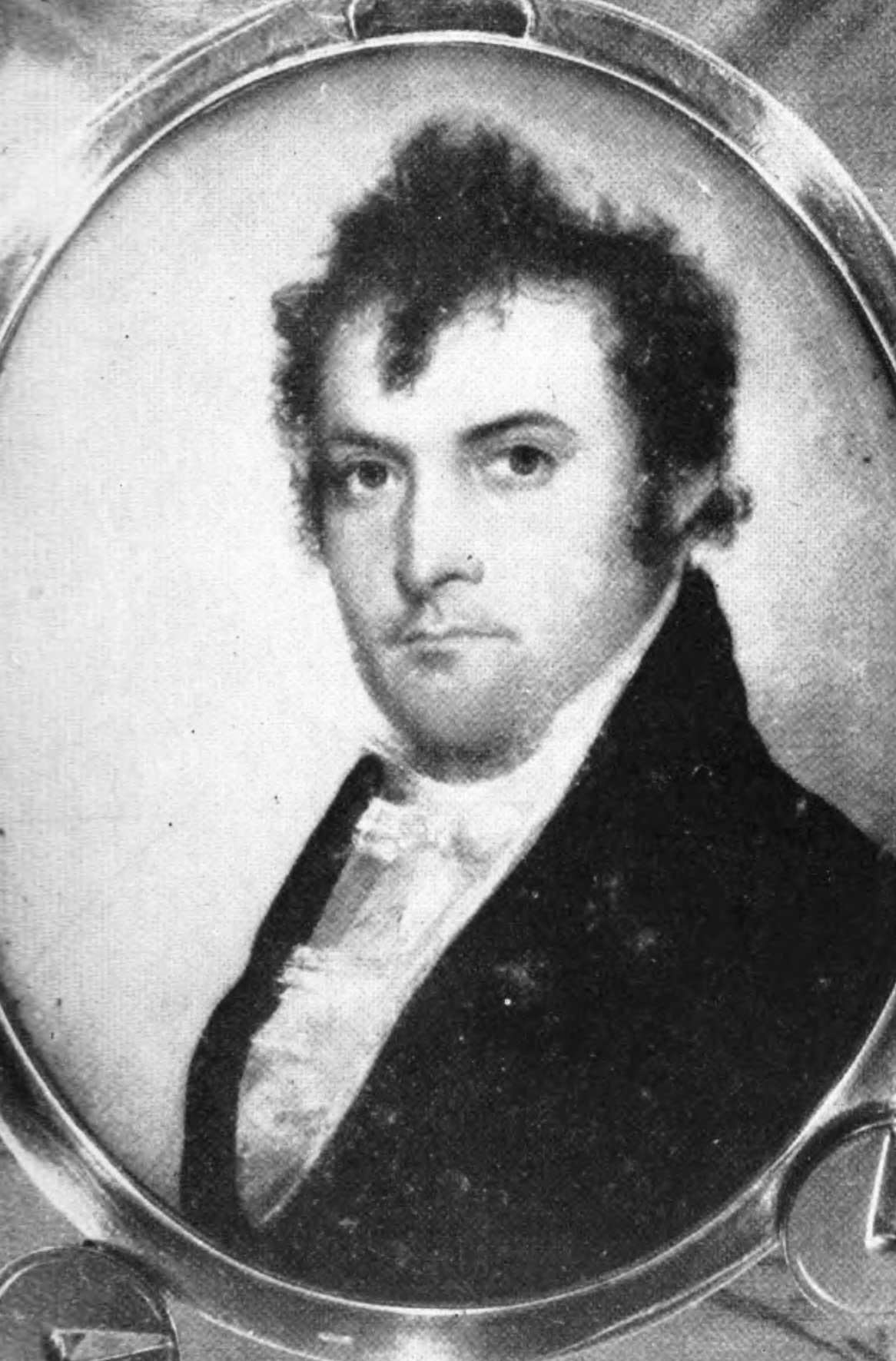
Stockley Donelson Hays (1788–1831), an important nephew who married a ward

- Samuel Jackson Hays - Nephew of the Jacksons, son of Robert and Jane (Donelson) Hays. Robert Hays died in 1818. Jane Hays moved away leaving Jackson with legal guardianship of the three youngest of their children. Andrew Jackson already had a close relationship with one of the older sons, Stockley Donelson Hays, and he had worked to pry the father out of debt. Jackson brought Samuel Jackson Hays with him to the White House and then sent him away for misbehavior. He entered West Point in 1823, Hays eventually served as a general during the Mexican-American War and became exceedingly rich from plantation investments and inherited slaves. He died in 1866.

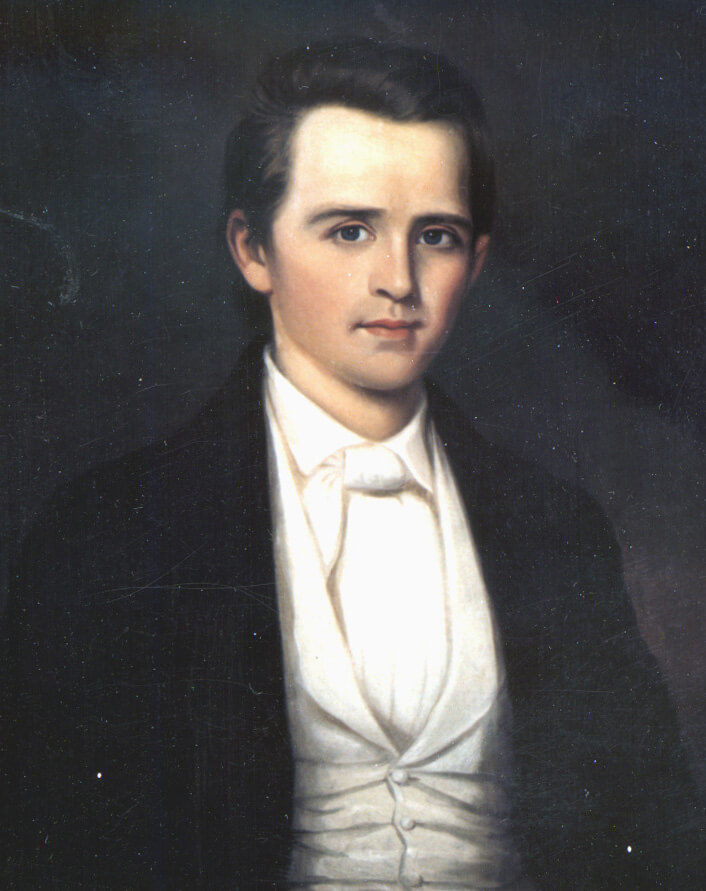
Andrew Jackson Hutchings (1815–1841)

- Andrew Jackson Hutchings - Son of Jackson's nephew-by-marriage and slave-trading business partner John Hutchings. He was taken to the Hermitage at age six, grew up there as one of the "three Andrews," and elaborately carved his initials into the side of a wooden desk drawer which is on occasional display for Hermitage tours. Hutchings was expelled from University of Nashville, became a planter in northern Alabama, married a daughter of Jackson's other slave-trading business partner and brother-in-arms John Coffee, got into some debt, and died of illness in 1841

== J ==
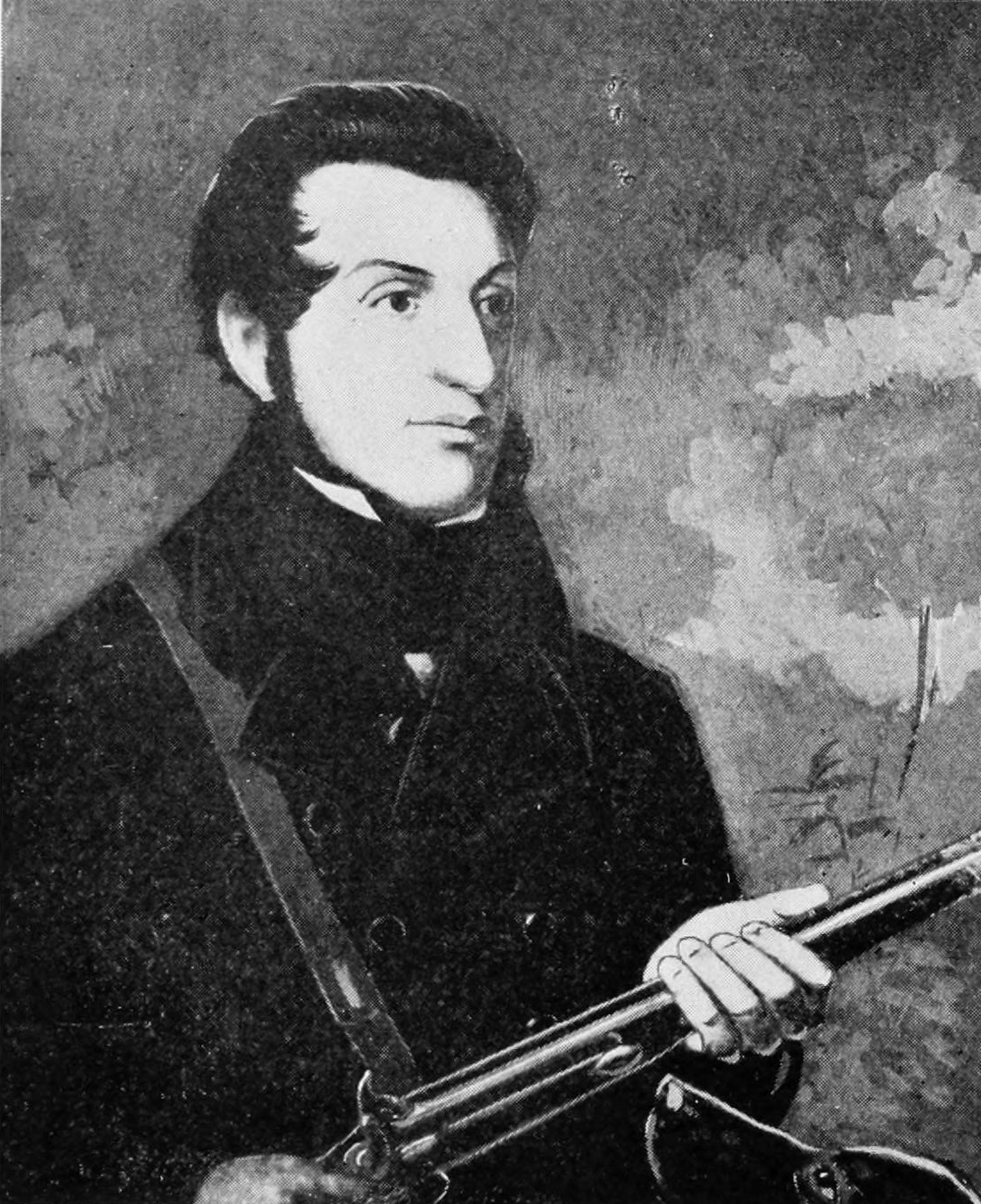
Andrew Jackson Jr. (1808–1865)

- Andrew Jackson Jr. - Jackson was born a twin, the fifth of nine children born to Rachel's brother Severn Donelson and his wife Elizabeth Rucker. He was taken by the Jacksons when he was three days old. Andrew Jackson Jr., as the name may tell, was the one adoptee or ward with whom "the Jacksons had a special relationship" and whom "they regarded as their own child." When Severn Donelson died in 1818, he did not ask Jackson to be guardian to his surviving children (including Andrew Jackson Jr.'s biological twin brother), and instead selected his brother William Donelson to be guardian. According to Remini, Andrew Jackson Jr. "grew up irresponsible and ambitionless, a considerable disappointment to his father."
- Lyncoya Jackson - Indigenous infant survivor of the Battle of Tallushatchee at which his parents were killed; taken prisoner and sent to live at the Hermitage where Jackson provided for his education until his death from tuberculosis in 1828 at age 16

== K ==
- Sarah Knox - Tentatively identified as a ward; she was the only surviving daughter of Rachel's niece Polly Caffery Knox and reportedly moved to the Hermitage after she was orphaned; married George Washington Sevier
- William Lucky Knox - Sarah's brother, a son of Polly Caffery and John Knox, he lived at the Hermitage as a child, from 1815 to 1827, but ran away at age 13 and moved to Louisiana. He was a Louisiana state representative from Carroll Parish 1858–1860.

== L ==
- Margaret Lewis - Daughter of William Terrell Lewis, a North Carolina state legislator, she married her cousin William Berkeley Lewis, who was a key figure in Jackson's Kitchen Cabinet. Their daughter Mary Anne Lewis married French diplomat Julius Pageot in a Jackson-sponsored White House ceremony in 1832.
- Myra Lewis - Another daughter of William T. Lewis who became a ward, she married Jackson's longtime ally and eventual Secretary of War John Eaton.

== M ==
- Samuel Moore - His father died in 1795 and Tennessee court records indicate that Jackson was appointed to be his guardian.

== S ==
- William Hunter Smith - Described by Jackson biographer Remini as "a neighbor's unwanted burden," he was a son of Bennett Smith and a brother of Mary Smith Hutchings (the wife of John Hutchings, who was a nephew of Rachel Jackson and as "Jacky" was Jackson's partner in slave trading and cotton shipping). Smith was also the nephew of future U.S. Senator from South Carolina William Smith. Little is known of William Hunter Smith's relationship with Jackson, but he eventually became a wealthy plantation and slave owner in Rutherford County, Tennessee. He raised cotton. Smith's parents outlived Andrew Jackson. William Hunter Smith's maternal grandfather was Congressman Joseph Dickson.

== T ==
- Theodore - Indigenous baby or child taken as a prisoner of war during the War of 1812 and sent to the Hermitage, where he died in early 1814

== W ==
- Jane Watkins - Orphaned neighbor of the Jacksons, lived for a time at the Hermitage.
- Margaret Watkins - Orphaned neighbor of the Jacksons, lived for a time at the Hermitage, Rachel Jackson gave her a heifer and a bedstead as a wedding present. According to memoirist Jane Thomas, "Margaret Watkins married Mr. Allen, who lived on Stone's River and kept a dry-goods store."
- Sam Watkins - In the telling of Thomas, "Mr. Sam Watkins's father and mother came to Nashville in the early settlement. They both died with fever, leaving six children, and the neighbors took the children to raise. Two of them lived at Gen. Andrew Jackson's. The eldest daughter married Solomon Clark. When Sam Watkins was a child he lived at Gen. Jackson's and part of the time with his two sisters. One of his sisters married Mr. Lewis, and one married Mr. Pew, and I don't remember whom the other one married. Sam Watkins learned the bricklayer's trade with his brother-in-law, Clark, and made his money that way. He lived on Line Street, and had a very large brick-yard. When the negroes were freed he had nearly fifty negro men whom he had taught to make and lay brick. He made a very large fortune, and everybody knows how judiciously it has been laid out. He never married, but died a respected and much-beloved old bachelor. He built a lovely little Methodist church and a parsonage on Park Street, and gave them to the Methodists. The Yankees destroyed them during the war. He gave twelve acres to the town to make a park out of. It is on Line Street, and is known as Watkins Park."
- Elizabeth Wilkinson - Minor child for whom Jackson served as legal guardian; she died c. 1811.

== See also ==
- Donelson family
- Indigenous members of the Andrew Jackson household
- Robards–Donelson–Jackson relationship controversy
- List of children of presidents of the United States
- Andrew Jackson and slavery
- Andrew Jackson and the slave trade in the United States
- Haysboro, Tennessee
- Old Hickory, Tennessee § History
- Bibliography of Andrew Jackson
- Fighting Butlers

== Sources ==
- Cheathem, Mark R. (October 2011). Slavery, Kinship, and Andrew Jackson's Presidential Campaign of 1828 (PDF). Southern Historical Association Annual Meeting. jacksonianamerica.com. Archived (PDF) from the original on 2024-08-22.
- ——— (2014). Andrew Jackson, Southerner. Baton Rouge, Louisiana: Louisiana State University Press. ISBN 978-0-8071-5099-3. LCCN 2012049695. OCLC 858995561. Project MUSE book 26506.
- Galloway, Linda Bennett (1950). "Andrew Jackson, Junior". Tennessee Historical Quarterly. 9 (3): 195–216. ISSN 0040-3261. JSTOR 42621045.
- Hale, Nathaniel Claiborne (1948). Roots in Virginia; an account of Captain Thomas Hale, Virginia frontiersman, his descendants and related families. With genealogies and sketches of Hale, Saunders, Lucke, Claiborne, Lacy, Tobin and contributing ancestral lines. Philadelphia?: n.pub. LCCN 48004982. OCLC 608535745. OL 8012660W.
- Hickey, Donald R. (1976). "Andrew Jackson and the Army Haircut: Individual Rights vs. Military Discipline". Tennessee Historical Quarterly. 35 (4): 365–375. ISSN 0040-3261. JSTOR 42623606.
- Horn, Stanley F. (1938). The Hermitage, Home of Old Hickory. Richmond: Garrett & Massie – via HathiTrust.
- Lee, Kristin Condotta (2018). "Trading Spaces: Commerce, Ethnicity, and Early Irish New Orleans". Louisiana History: The Journal of the Louisiana Historical Association. 59 (3): 261–307. ISSN 0024-6816. JSTOR 26564809.
- Meredith, Rachel (May 2013). "There Was Somebody Always Dying and Leaving Jackson as Guardian": The Wards of Andrew Jackson (M.A. History thesis). Murfreesboro, Tennessee: Middle Tennessee State University. ProQuest 1538368.
- Owsley, Harriet Chappell (1982). "Andrew Jackson and His Ward, Andrew Jackson Donelson". Tennessee Historical Quarterly. 41 (2): 124–139. ISSN 0040-3261. JSTOR 42626276.
- Plater, David D. (2015). The Butlers of Iberville Parish, Louisiana: Dunboyne Plantation in the 1800s. Baton Rouge: Louisiana State University Press. ISBN 978-0-8071-6128-9. Project MUSE book 48467.
- Remini, Robert V. (1977). Andrew Jackson and the Course of American Empire, 1767–1821. New York: Harper & Row. ISBN 978-0-8018-5912-0. LCCN 77003766. OCLC 1145801830.
- Rothstein, Morton (1979). "The Changing Social Networks and Investment Behavior of a Slaveholding Elite in the Ante Bellum South: Some Natchez Nabobs, 1800–1860". In Greenfield, Sidney M.; Strickon, Arnold; Aubey, Robert T. (eds.). Entrepreneurs in Cultural Context. School of American Research, Advanced Seminar Series. Albuquerque: University of New Mexico Press. pp. 65–88. ISBN 978-0-8263-0504-6. LCCN 78021433. OCLC 4859059.
- Thomas, Jane Henry (1897). Old Days in Nashville, Tennessee. Nashville, Tennessee: Publishing house Methodist Episcopal church, South, Barbee & Smith, agents. hdl:loc.gdc/scd0001.00146133502. LCCN 08018615. OCLC 4159540. OL 140000W.
