= Samuel J. Hays =

American land and slave owner (1800–1866)

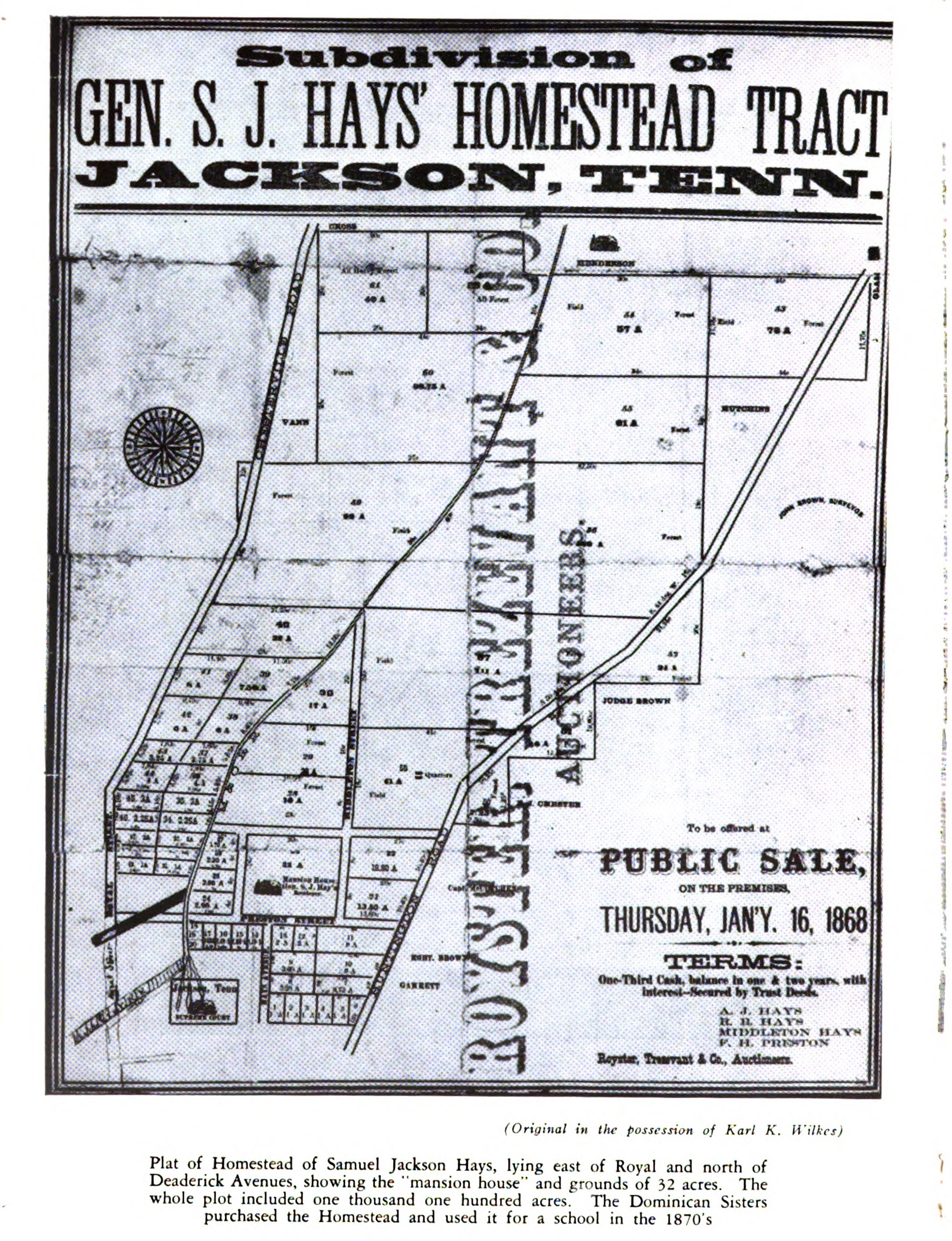
- S. D. Hays Homestead Tract, Jackson, Tennessee, listed for sale after Hays' death
- Born: c. 1802; Haysboro, Tennessee, U.S.
- Died: November 3, 1866; Madison County, Tennessee, U.S.
- Parent(s): Robert Hays & Jane Donelson
- Relatives: Stockley D. Hays (brother)
- Family: Andrew Jackson (guardian)

Samuel Jackson Hays (c. 1802–November 3, 1866) was an American militia officer, lawyer, slave owner, plantation owner, and railroad investor in west Tennessee. His father was Robert Hays and his uncle was President Andrew Jackson; Jackson's wife Rachel and his mother Jane Donelson Hays were sisters. The extended Donelson clan, with Jackson serving as patriarch (founder John Donelson was killed in 1785), is credited with being exceptionally efficient at using kinship networks as profit centers and engaging in what has been described as vertically integrated family-business imperialism: "They fought the native peoples, negotiated the treaties to end the fighting and demanded native lands as the price of war, surveyed the newly available lands, bought those lands, litigated over disputed boundaries, adjudicated the cases, and made and kept laws within the region that had been carved out of Indian lands."

Historian Lorman Ratner described Andrew Jackson as a boy without a father, and a man without sons, which may have motivated him to accept guardianship of dozens of young people who lived with him at various times or whom he assisted legally, financially, or socially. Hays, as a nephew and ward of Andrew Jackson, was one of the several early participants in and beneficiaries of this system. Hays was one of several wards whom Jackson sent to West Point, and he brought Hays to Washington, D.C. in the first year of his presidency, and then sent him away, considering Hays and his son Andrew Jackson Jr. to be bad influences on one another. For the remainder of Jackson's life he continued a correspondence with Hays, who served as a key outpost in his social–political network across the U.S. South.

Nominally a lawyer, Hays' income seems to have come from cotton planting and slave ownership, and his power base was his authority as a local militia leader in west Tennessee, which was brought to bear during the American colonization of Texas and the subsequent Mexican-American War. He was considered the richest person in Madison County, Tennessee before the American Civil War, and was among the top one percent of slave owners nationwide. Hays died shortly after the end of the war, and his heirs were said to have been impoverished.

== Early life ==
Hays was born at Haysboro, Tennessee; after his father Robert Hays died in 1819, his mother Jane Donelson Hays moved away from Nashville, and he became Andrew Jackson's ward, one of several nephews and nieces and children of friends who were taken in at the Hermitage. Hays was sent to the U.S. Military Academy, entering 1823. This was the same class as Pierce B. Anderson, Leonidas Polk, Abraham Van Buren, and Philip St. George Cooke. According to a letter Andrew Jackson wrote to another ward, Anthony Wayne Butler (brother of Edward G. W. Butler), Jackson had paid to outfit Hays for West Point, which was part of why Jackson's finances were tight and he could not lend or give Butler more money. Jackson, who was always preoccupied with the education of his male wards, and who deemed West Point the "best school" in the country, sent several of his charges to the U.S. Military Academy in the 1810s and 1820s.

At West Point he was involved in an alcohol infraction in 1825, along with fellow cadets Jefferson Davis, Theophilus Mead, James Allison, and James F. Swift. They were all court-martialled but Davis and Hays were pardoned and returned to duty by John Quincy Adams. Hays may not have graduated, according to the editors of the Papers of Jefferson Davis Hays had been absent without leave and thus resigned in 1826; he later wrote that he had three years at the military academy. Hays became a lawyer at the Davidson County, Tennessee bar in 1828.

Hays moved at an unknown date with his kinship network of brothers and in-laws and were amongst the earliest settlers of what became Madison County in the Chickasaw lands opened by the Treaty of Tuscaloosa, which had been negotiated by Andrew Jackson and Isaac Shelby. Hays' widowed mother lived with him at Hays Hill in Madison County, in what was originally a double log house. The Hays family later bought a house known as Miller Hill, or Bellwood, from Hays' sister's husband, Robert I. Chester. The town was named Jackson in honor of "Old Hickory," to whom many early settlers had personal ties.

During the no-holds-barred 1828 U.S. presidential campaign, Andrew Jackson's former aide-de-camp William P. Anderson published letters written by the surgeon on hand during the Jackson–Dickinson duel of 1806; S. J. Hays wrote a public letter attacking Anderson's character, and Anderson's son Rufus K. Anderson in turn published a rebuttal, criticizing Samuel J. Hays specifically and other Jackson campaign committee members generally. The Jackson papers at Library of Congress include a draft of Hays' statement against Anderson.

Hays met his future wife, Frances Pinckney Middleton, at Jackson's 1829 inaugural ball; her uncle was Arthur Middleton, one of the signers of the United States Declaration of Independence. Jackson brought Samuel Jackson Hays with him to the White House and then sent him away for misbehavior. On March 19, 1829, President Jackson wrote John Coffee describing the troubles of two of his wards and his adopted son, now all three young adults:

I Just have heard that my dr little Hutchings has been suspended at college, & I fear expelled—my dr Genl, attend to him, he is an orphant [sic], and altho [sic] a head strong & ungovernable boy, I have his prosperity & good name much at heart—I was fearful to leave him without some person to control & council him, and I am happy I did not bring him on with me, as here he would have been ruined; I must send Saml Hays from here, and when I can find a good place, my son also—They must be seperated [sic] or both ruined—by idleness."

Shortly thereafter Jackson wrote Coffee that he was sending Hays to "Judge Tuckers law school in few days," meaning the private school run by Henry St. George Tucker at Winchester, Virginia. Toward the end of the summer Jackson wrote to Andrew Jackson Jr. that "Saml Hays has been absent a month, [in upstate New York] with young Mr Van Buren; I have expected him for a fortnight, but I find his mind too unstable to profit here by reading, he cannot nor will not confine himself to his Book, his mind wandering on other & trivial subjects, unprofitable to improvement—He will permit the year to pass without benefit to his mind, & with an exausted [sic] purse." Hays proposed to Frances Middleton in August 1829. Andrew Jackson wrote to Middleton's guardian, Congressman James Hamilton Jr., about the planned marriage. Hamilton mentioned his approval in a separate letter to Martin Van Buren, mentioning his appreciation of the message from the president. Hays and Middleton were married in Charleston, South Carolina on November 24, 1829. He eventually became "owner of one thousand slaves, three hundred of whom had been a marriage dower" to his wife, Frances Pinckney Middleton. The couple had 13 children but only four survived long into adulthood. The Hays newlyweds may have set up housekeeping in Madison County in 1830.

== West Tennessee commerce, politics, and patronage jobs ==
A letter from Jackson to Hays, written in April 1830 and rediscovered in an old trunk in the 1950s, suggests that the President partially relied on Hays to maintain the Hermitage in his absence. Jackson requested that Hays provide him with an index of all his mares and colts, and asked Hays to make sure that the family slaves Betty and Hannah maintained the plantings around Rachel Jackson's tomb and garden the way he wanted them to be. Jackson also wrote to Hays at the height of the Nullification crisis, enclosing a newspaper that reprinted his presidential message on that question:

Washington, december 7th, 1830. My dear Sam'l: I inclose you my message this day delivered. It is published in the Globe. I send for you Doctor Butler, Col. S. D. Hays and my friend Chester, this message is for you all, not having one for each, with the prospectus of the Globe. It is of the true faith, no nulification in the Globe. Patronize it. I will be happy to hear your opinion of the message and expect you all to patronize the Globe. The editor is the late editor of the Kentucky Argus, no nullifier but of the true faith. I will be happy to see you, and your dear wife here, with my namesake. Carolina is torn to pieces. I hope the steam will blow off without bursting a boiler, and that our friend Hamilton will be elected Governor, but all is doubtful, I would like to see [your sister] Narcissa with you. Salutations to all. Yours affectionately, A. J."

An 1830 letter from Jackson to Hays complained about Congressman Davy Crockett's votes in favor of appropriations for internal improvements (infrastructure) and against the Indian Removal Act, and urged Hays to inform Crockett's constituents that he had been seen walking in company with New Englander Daniel Webster. Jackson also chided Hays for talking with his cousins about the so-called Petticoat Affair, with Jackson writing, "Major Eaton was so enraged at the treatment of Emily to his wife that it was with some difficulty that I prevented Major Eaton from making it a serious matter with Andrew. My dear Samuel you ought to have had more prudence than to communicate anything that would have giren any pain to that amiable old lady."

In 1831 Jackson wrote Hays with orders to electioneer hard against the Congressional candidacy of Crockett, who was both an anti-Jacksonian generally and who specifically opposed the nomination of Hays' brother Stockley D. Hays to a government land office job. (Note: For more background on the disputed Hays appointment, see Miles, Edwin A. (February 1958). "Andrew Jackson and Senator George Poindexter". The Journal of Southern History. 24 (1): 51–66. doi:10.2307/2955285. JSTOR 2955285.) Samuel J. Hays was 14 years younger than his brother Stockley D. Hays and has this been mistakenly described as his son. In the first two decades of the 19th century Stockley D. Hays had been a crucial satellite in Jackson's orbit, but Davy Crockett suggested in 1831 that S.D. Hays had been debilitated for many years with alcoholism and thus he may have fallen out of rotation. As part of a larger controversy over Jackson's use of the so-called spoils system, it was at this time that "A Corn Planter of Madison County" called out the political appointments and government-funded salaries of Hays' brother Stockley and brothers-in-law R. I. Chester and Robert Butler, as well as those of John Coffee, John C. McLemore, and A. J. Donelson, asking, "Have we, sir, no high minded and honorable men amongst is, who are qualified to offices of honor, profit, and trust, but the nephews of President Jackson?" As one history of public administration explained, "By the time Andrew Jackson came into power, merit was only secondary in executive department appointments. During Jackson's administration the policy of political patronage and nepotism in federal employment was intensified, partly because of his belief that rotation of government jobs was an essentially democratic process. What this actually implies is that political nepotism is not corruption, but one of the principles of sound democracy. This is, of course, ridiculous!" As another history framed the "nephews of Andrew Jackson" problem: "With Jackson...many [public offices] were filled with individuals who were ill-equipped for the responsibilities demanded of them. Jackson did not regard this as a problem, but instead believed that an individual needed no particular training or education to succeed in politics or government."

An 1832 letter from Jackson mentioning that Samuel J. Hays was going to transport a dog and a "gator" (misspelling of guitar) from Washington back to Tennessee is considered evidence that Sarah Yorke Jackson owned a guitar, which is possibly the reason the Hermitage driveway is shaped like a guitar. In 1833 Hays wrote a public letter to the militia electorate of Madison County stating that he had no ties to the South Carolina Nullifier movement even though his wife hailed from that state. Hays was one of three candidates for the Tennessee House of Representatives from Madison County in 1835. In 1839, Jackson wrote Hays, "You must not permit that...scamp [John Wesley] Crockett to be elected—he is the mere tool of [John] Bell & J. Q. Adams, without principle or talents & has become a good Whig by learning of Lying & Slandering good & honest men." This enmity was apparently a carryover from Jackson's pre-existing fury toward the late Davy Crockett, who had opposed both Indian Removal and the appointment of Hays' late brother S. D. Hays to high office. In 1843, by act of state legislature, Hays was named trustee from Madison County for the Memphis Conference Female Institute.

== American colonies in Texas ==
In 1835, Hays, brother-in-law Chester, and another brother-in-law, William Edward Butler, bought land to farm in Mexican Texas and moved 40 slaves there for that purpose but "feared that the Mexican government would...free their slaves and this would mean that they were ruined financially...so they decided to return to Tennessee." In the telling of a descendant in 1998, "They managed to get in a crop before the...war started, but they didn't get it out. They left for home." After the Texas Revolution started, Hays was named captain of the Jackson Blues, a company organized in Tennessee to support the Texian side of that war. He was captain of a company "called out for the protection of the Sabine Frontier 1836 under authority of the General Gaines approved by the War Department." Edmund P. Gaines was responsible for "protecting the Western Frontier of the United States from attack by Mexicans and Native Americans, who [were] fighting the Texans." Hays' company was one of those formed when Gaines "called on the governors of Louisiana, Mississippi, Tennessee, and Alabama to furnish 2500 volunteers each to help police the border." Hays assignment was to "muster the troops to Memphis for maneuvers and then to New Orleans to Winfield Scott," and the elites of Madison County were said to be in a state of "considerable excitement, owing to the recruiting of soldiers for the frontier. This County will furnish a company, of the bravest and best." Sometime between 1837 and 1838, Hays, Chester, and William Butler all signed a document relating to Robertson's colony in Texas.

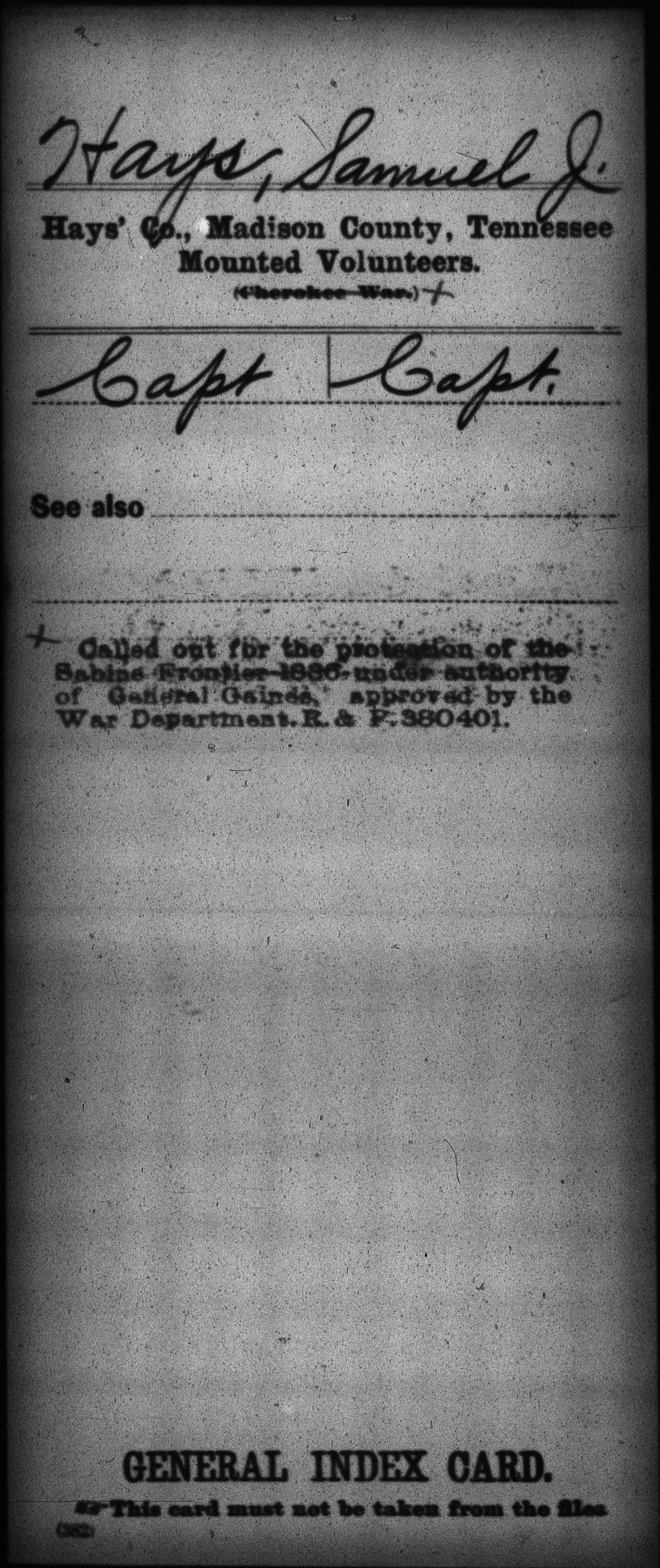
Records of Volunteer Soldiers - Entry for Samuel J. Hays of Hays' Company of Madison County Tennessee Mounted Volunteers, 1836

In 1845 Hays signed an open letter urging Sam Houston to visit the city of Memphis, Tennessee. Letters written by S. J. Hays in 1845 to Lyman Draper are a primary source on the biographies of Hays' father and mother. Hays was a major general of the Tennessee militia at the time of the Mexican-American War, 4th Division, Second Army of Tennessee, thus the honorific Gen. Hays followed him through life in the South. Bertram Wyatt-Brown wrote that it was common for ambitious antebellum southern lawyers to seek grant themselves titles and emoluments: "The title of Major, Colonel, or best of all, General did wonders for reputation in that very hierarchical society."

One account states that Hays was once selected by the Tennessee state legislature to be a U.S. Senator but he declined to accept, and at another time turned down the job of postmaster of Charleston. In 1845 the Nashville Union published a letter urging the state Democratic Party to nominate Hays for Tennessee Governor. Andrew Jackson wrote to Samuel J. Hays just 11 days before "the Old Hero" died, describing his dropsy symptoms, discussing his religious beliefs as he approached the end of life, and celebrating that Hays had gotten free of a financial obligation in Mississippi, with Jackson urging Hays to stay out of debt as much as possible.

In 1849 Hays listed his city house for sale. This was probably the house called Bellwood, which was "sold to George Miller, president of the Bank of Madison in the 1850s, and after several other owners, still stands today on Liberty Street."

== 1850s: Slavery, cotton, construction ==
Slaves owned by Hays grew cotton for sale to international fabric and garment markets. Sometime after the Mexican War, Hays moved to a new-built house "which was long remembered as one of the most magnificent of the homes of Jackson, with its lawn adorned with statuary imported from Italy, its furnishings of rosewood and mahogany, its liveried Guinea slaves. The house was built on what is now Preston street, the gate to the long driveway opening on what is now Hays Avenue." The Hays place reportedly cost about US$20,000 (equivalent to $691,071 in 2025) to build.

At the time of the 1850 U.S. census, Hays owned slaves that were attached to two separate properties in Tennessee: 10 on one, and 127 on another. At the time of the 1860 U.S. census, Hays had 50 slaves living in 10 slave houses in Tennessee, and 50 slaves in Duncan Township, Monroe County, Arkansas held "in trust" for him by Moses Moore. In 1860, owning more than 100 slaves would have put him in the top 0.1 percent of American slave owners. Only six percent of Madison County, Tennessee households owned 20 or more slaves in 1860. Hays also owned real property in Shelby County and across the Mississippi River in Arkansas. His Shelby County land holding was 4,000 acres, some of which was used for railroad development. As summarized by an agricultural historian, the class structure of antebellum western Tennessee meant that "the well-to-do of Madison County immersed themselves in a market-based form of commercial agriculture. They focused on the cash crop of cotton and the unique requirements of marketing this profitable fiber, enjoying a lifestyle which did not require the ceaseless toil of family members on small plots but rather the labor of slaves on large tracts of improved acreage. In the decade preceding the Civil War, Madison County planters increased their already disproportionate share of the area's land, cotton, and slaves."

In the 1850s, Hays was a slave labor contractor for the Mobile and Ohio Railroad through west Tennessee. He was also a commissioner of the Lexington and Knoxville Railroad and the Mississippi Central and Tennessee Railroad.

== American Civil War, death, and legacy ==
In 1860, Hays' son Robert Hays shot and injured two people with a double-barreled shotgun in the Jackson town square over a misunderstanding.

Confederate President Jeff Davis reportedly offered Hays, his old West Point companion, a generalship in the Confederate States Army, but Hays declined due to old age; four of his sons and two sons-in-law reportedly volunteered for the Confederacy. Hays was said to have paid to outfit a company of Confederates from Madison County. There was a Union Army encampment on Hays' land sometime between June 1862 and June 1863. According to Tennessee writer J. G. Cisco, Hays was "probably the wealthiest man in Madison County but the civil war and other misfortunes left his descendants poor." Among his descendants involved in the war and aftermath were Middleton "Mid" Hays, of the 6th Tennessee (Confederate), Company H, who was wounded at the Battle of Shiloh. Mid Hays refused to take the oath of allegiance to the United States, and was later a local organizer of the Ku Klux Klan, reportedly recruited by Nathan Bedford Forrest himself.

Hays reportedly prepared for his death by buying a metal casket for himself in Memphis and storing it in his attic until the time came. He died in 1866 and is likely buried in Riverside Cemetery in Jackson, Tennessee. Hays was predeceased by his wife, who died in 1865; his will mentioned real estate in Tennessee and Arkansas, four surviving children, and Abraham and Amy, who had been enslaved by him before the war.

His house was later purchased by the Dominican Sisters of St. Agnes in Memphis for use as a nunnery and school. Jefferson Davis' first speech after his release from prison was meant to be at St. Luke's Episcopal Church in Jackson but the crowd was so large the event was relocated to "the grove in front of General Samuel J. Hays's home near the corner of Preston and Hays Avenue." The Academy of the Immaculate Conception, formerly the Hays house, burned down on February 27, 1873. According to local folklore, a student was helping burn leaves in the yard, and when her dress caught fire she ran into the house for help. The girl was saved but the building caught fire and was gutted. This land eventually became the site of a Piggly-Wiggly Corporation plant.

The five acres of land on which the town of Arlington, Tennessee was built, on the Louisville and Nashville Railroad, was originally donated by Hays in 1856. One of Arlington's early names was Haysville, after S. J. Hays' role in the founding. Hays Avenue is East Jackson, Tennessee was so named because it was the site of his "palatial" house.

In 1894, two of Mid Hays' sons were involved in Christmas Eve shooting of an African-American man; their "prominent family" background was mentioned in the news coverage:

SHOOTING SCRAPE AT JACKSON. A Negro Shot and Killed by a Seventeen-Year-O1d White Boy, Jackson, Tenn., Dec. 25. — Sam Hays, son of Mid Hays, a member of the Jackson police force, is charged with firing a shot which killed Will Austin, a negro, last night; on West LaFayette street. Sam and his brother, Ruddy, were in a grocery store when some words passed between them and Austin. The boys and Austin went out on the street, where the quarrel was renewed and the negro was shot in the abdomen, dying in a short time. When found, Austin had a knife clutched in his hand. Young Hays waived an examination this morning, and gave bond for his appearance. Hays is not over 17 years of age, and is a member of a prominent family.

== See also ==
- John Donelson § Descendants
- Eggnog Riot, another incident at West Point involving alcohol and Jeff Davis
- Andrew Jackson and the slave trade in the United States
- List of children of presidents of the United States
- List of United States Military Academy non-graduate alumni

== Sources ==
- Boylston, James R.; Wiener, Allen J. (2009). David Crockett in Congress: The Rise and Fall of the Poor Man's Friend. Houston, Texas: Bright Sky Press. ISBN 978-1-933979-51-9. LCCN 2009024431. OCLC 318426723.
- Edwards, Gary T. (1999). "Men of Subsistence and Men of Substance: Agricultural Lifestyles in Antebellum Madison County, Tennessee". Agricultural History. 73 (3): 303–321. ISSN 0002-1482. JSTOR 3744173.
- Fleming, Walter L. (1909). "Jefferson Davis at West Point". Publications of the Mississippi Historical Society. X. Oxford, Mississippi: 247–267.
- Fleming, Walter L. (1920). "Some Documents Relating to Jefferson Davis at West Point". The Mississippi Valley Historical Review. 7 (2): 146–152. doi:10.2307/1902656. ISSN 0161-391X. JSTOR 1902656. Archived from the original on 2025-02-26.
- Karsch, Robert F. (1937). "Tennessee's Interest in the Texan Revolution, 1835–1836". Tennessee Historical Magazine. 3 (4): 206–239. ISSN 2333-9012. JSTOR 42638126. Archived from the original on 2023-03-26.
- Inman, Natalie R. (2017). "4. The Donelsons: Social, Political, and Economic Expansion on the Frontier". Brothers and Friends: Kinship in Early America. Early American Spaces. Athens, Georgia: University of Georgia Press. doi:10.1353/book51901. ISBN 978-0-8203-5110-0. LCCN 2016055415. OCLC 985105661.
- Meredith, Rachel (May 2013). "There Was Somebody Always Dying and Leaving Jackson as Guardian": The Wards of Andrew Jackson (M.A. History thesis). Murfreesboro, Tennessee: Middle Tennessee State University. ProQuest 1538368.
- Owsley, Harriet Chappell (1982). "Andrew Jackson and His Ward, Andrew Jackson Donelson". Tennessee Historical Quarterly. 41 (2): 124–139. ISSN 0040-3261. JSTOR 42626276.
- Robinson, Dan M. (1967). "Robert Hays, Unsung Pioneer of the Cumberland, Country". Tennessee Historical Quarterly. 26 (3): 263–278. ISSN 0040-3261. JSTOR 42622953.
- Shockley, Megan Taylor (1997). "King of the Wild Frontier vs. King Andrew I: Davy Crockett and the Election of 1831". Tennessee Historical Quarterly. 56 (3): 158–169. ISSN 0040-3261. JSTOR 42627359.
- Williams, Emma Inman (1946). Historic Madison: The Story of Jackson and Madison County, Tennessee, from the Prehistoric Moundbuilders to 1917. Jackson, Tennessee: Madison County Historical Society. LCCN 47004107. OCLC 4045339 – via University of Virginia Libraries, HathiTrust.
- Various; Jackson, Andrew (2007). Feller, Daniel; Moser, Harold D.; Moss, Laura-Eve; Coens, Thomas (eds.). The Papers of Andrew Jackson, Volume VII, 1829. Knoxville: University of Tennessee Press. ISBN 978-1-57233-593-6. Archived from the original on 2025-02-26.
