= William Lucky Knox =

Louisiana state legislator (1813–1881)

- Born: January 15, 1813; Claiborne County, Mississippi Territory
- Died: December 29, 1881 (aged 68); Dallas County, Texas

William Lucky Knox (January 15, 1813–December 29, 1881) was a plantation owner and state legislator in Louisiana, United States.

== Early life ==
Knox was a son of Mary Caffery, a niece of Rachel and Andrew Jackson, and John Knox, a second cousin of James Knox Polk. In 1806, his grandfather John Caffery listed for sale "fourteen or fifteen Negroes" belonging to his other grandfather Benjamin Knox, "deceased." According to a letter written in 1881, John Knox was "from North Carolina; had also lived in Georgia. Says he was a great friend of General Jackson, and took part with him in all his big horse races and chicken fights, etc." According to a Knox genealogy published in 1905, William Lucky Knox was "named for one of the Luckeys, near them in North Carolina, and who it is thought had married his father's sister." John Knox, the father, died when Wm. L. Knox was a year old, and he and his sister were taken in by the Jacksons in Nashville. He lived at the Hermitage as a child...He took great interest in political matters. It was while living with General Jackson, listening to the conversation of Houston, Benton, Governor Call, E. W. Foster [sic], John Bell and other great men of that day, that he received his first inspiration for politics. He remembered perfectly the appearance of both Jackson and General Lafayette, who visited General Jackson while he lived there..." Knox ran away from the Hermitage in 1827 and relocated to south Louisiana.

== Career and later life ==
In 1850 he owned real estate worth $4,000. In 1854 there was a fire at his property near Lake Providence, the damages were estimated at $2,500. In 1856, in his capacity as sheriff of Carroll Parish, he auctioned off "Gen. L. J. Polk's negroes...negro men ranged from $1,450 to $1,635; women and from $1,350 to $1,550; children in proportion—all cash. Such a sale we venture to say has never been equalled in the State."

Knox served in the Louisiana state legislature as a representative from Carroll Parish in 1857 and 1859. The research library is the Louisiana legislature lists W. L. Knox as a representative in 1858, 1859, and 1860. He was a member of the Democratic Party. He was promoted for Louisiana state treasurer in 1859 by "A Democrat without Prefix" who wrote of him, "has been a resident of Carroll for twenty-two years; has no superior as a canvasser and stump speaker, invariably overwhelms his opponent by his humor, wit and anecdote; has never been defeated in his own parish; is popular wherever known, and can beat the man who invented electioneering. Born in Claiborne county, Mississippi, reared in sight of the Hermitage in Tennessee, and identified by long residence with Louisiana, he is an ardent friend of Southern rights; and a nephew of Mrs. Jackson, and relative of James K. Polk, he is by education, tradition and association, after the straightest sect of his religion, a Democrat."

At the time of the 1860 U.S. census he was resident in Providence, Carroll Parish, Louisiana, listed his occupation as "planter and statesman," and was possessed of $25,000 in real estate and $45,000 in personal property. He owned five slaves in one household in Carroll Parish and "was listed elsewhere in this parish as a slave owner."

He moved to Texas in 1874, and was appointed postmaster at Mesquite, Texas. He elected a commissioner of Dallas County. He died and was buried in Dallas, Texas.

== See also ==
- Wards of Andrew Jackson
- Donelson family

== Sources ==
- n.a. (September 8, 2026). "Membership in the Louisiana House of Representatives, 1812 to 2028" (PDF). Baton Rouge: David R. Poynter Legislative Research Library, Louisiana House of Representatives.
