= Thomas Hutchings =

American pioneer settler (1740s–1810s)

- Born: 1740s? Likely Virginia
- Died: 1804 (possibly 1810); Likely Tennessee

Thomas Hutchings (1740–1750, died 1804–1810) was an American lawyer and surveyor, North Carolina state legislator, and brother-in-law of future U.S. president Andrew Jackson.

== Career ==
Thomas Hutchings was on John Donelson's 1780 voyage on the Tennessee River during which his "negro man" died from frostbite or similar ("being much frosted of his feet and legs, of which he died"). In 1786 he represented Sullivan County (now Tennessee) in the North Carolina House of Commons. In 1787 he served as a clerk for the Hawkins County court of pleas and quarter sessions. In August 1796 he was commissioned a justice of the Davidson County court of pleas and quarter sessions.

== Personal life ==
His father Christopher Hutchings was an Englishman who became a surveyor in Pittsylvania County, Virginia. He was married on July 4, 1772, in Guilford County, North Carolina, to Catherine Donelson, one of the daughters of Tennessee pioneer John Donelson. They had nine children together, including John Hutchings, a business partner of Andrew Jackson. Catherine Donelson Hutchings died in Madison County, Tennessee at the home of her son William E. Hutchings in 1835.

== See also ==
- Robert Hays (Tennessee), another brother-in-law
- Donelson family

== Sources ==
- Ely, James W. Jr.; Brown, Theodore Jr., eds. (1987). Legal Papers of Andrew Jackson. Supplement to the Papers of Andrew Jackson. Knoxville, Tennessee: University of Tennessee Press. ISBN 978-0-87049-355-3. LCCN 82002635. OCLC 17590211.
- Jackson, Andrew (1980). Smith, Sam; Owsley, Harriet (eds.). The Papers of Andrew Jackson: Volume I, 1770-1803. University of Tennessee Press. doi:10.7290/utp7943. ISBN 978-0-87049-219-8.
