= Chase C. Mooney =

U.S. historian (1913–1973)

- Born: September 30, 1913; Tennessee, U.S.
- Died: April 29, 1973 (aged 59); Indiana, U.S.
- Occupations: Historian, college professor

Chase Curran Mooney (September 30, 1913 – April 29, 1973) was a Guggenheim Fellowship and Rosenwald Fund Fellowship-winning American historian. He specialized in the history of the 19th-century United States.

== Biography ==
Born into a family of teachers, he attended Vanderbilt University from undergrad through his Ph.D. During the window between 1939 and 1945, he worked for a time alongside Harriett Owsley and Blanche Henry Clark on what were known as the Owsley charts, "a composite of Schedules I (land ownership), H (slave ownership), and IV (products of agriculture) of the unpublished Federal Census for Tennessee, 1850 and 1860." Mooney served in the U.S. Army during World War II, working as a senior historian.

His 1957 Slavery in Tennessee was praised at the time of publication as the most complete and definitive work on the topic to that time; the book was reprinted by Negro Universities Press in 1971. He was an associate editor of the Journal of American History from 1963 to 1966.

Mooney's posthumously published biography of William H. Crawford was described as "more than just another rehash of a life...It is consummately a biography of one of Georgia's great men...it is a fine example of historiography brilliantly and sparsely written. Third, it is a source work about a little-known man caught up in commonly known times and places." A native of Tennessee, Mooney taught at Indiana University for most of his career.

== See also ==
- Frank Lawrence Owsley
