= William Edward Butler =

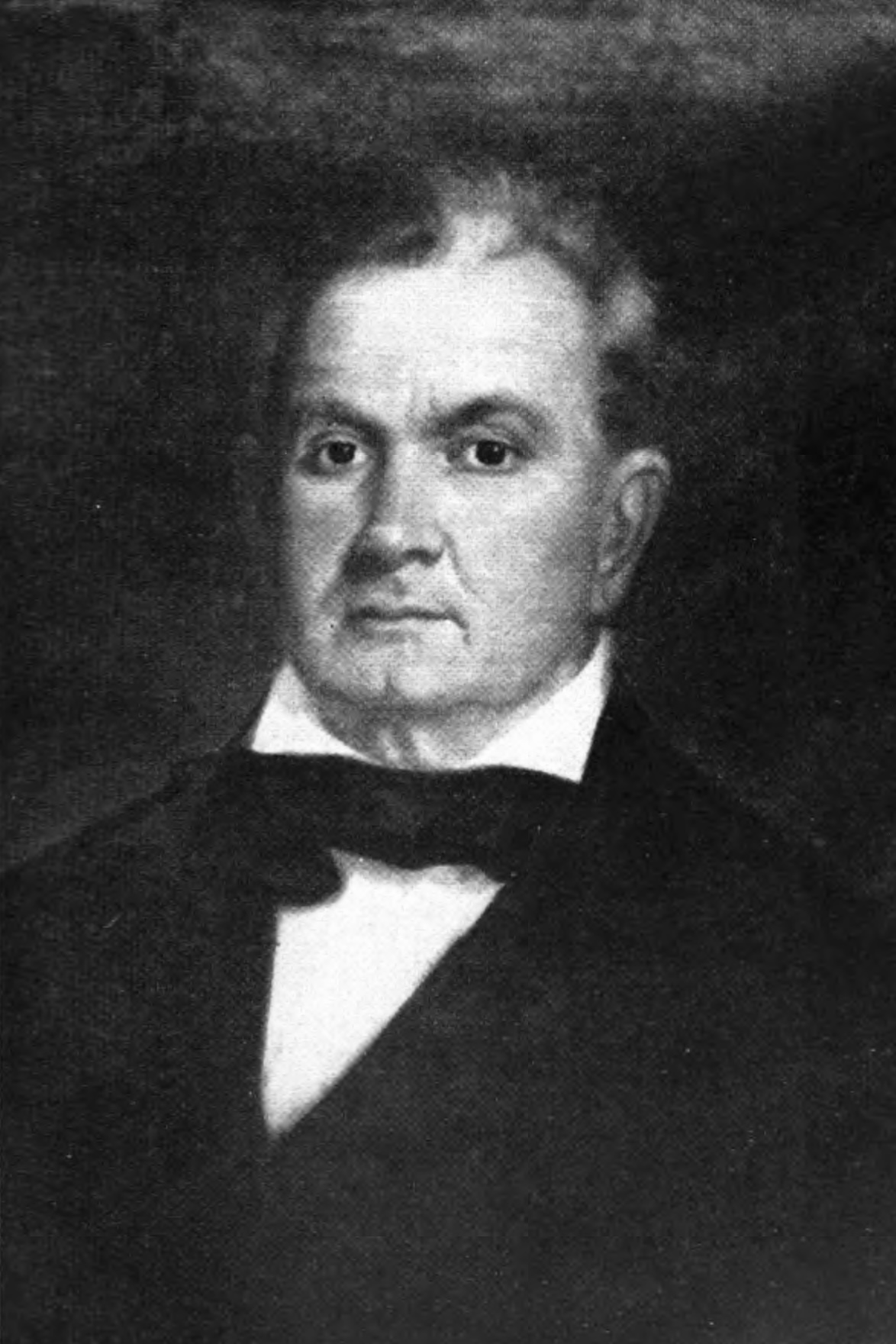
William Edward Butler (1790–1882), "the father of Jackson, Tennessee"

William Edward Butler (1790–1882) was a pioneer settler of western Tennessee and a kinsman of President Andrew Jackson. The son of Revolutionary War officer Thomas Butler, he married Jackson's niece and ward Martha Thompson "Patsy" Hays, sister of Stockley Donelson Hays and Samuel Jackson Hays. Butler served as a "surgeon of the 2nd Tennessee Regiment under Andrew Jackson" in the War of 1812.

Butler ran against Davy Crockett in 1821 for a seat in the Tennessee General Assembly. Butler was at that time known as "one of the wealthiest, most public—spirited, aristocratic, and hospitable men of Jackson, Tennessee." Crockett won, partly because he handed out whiskey and tobacco to voters, partly on public policy and charisma, and partly because he appealed to the proletariat with stump speech descriptions of Butler's fine lifestyle including luxurious carpets, such that "every day he walks on truck finer than any gowns your wives or your daughters, in all their lives, ever wore!"

One history states, "The Butlers were very wealthy and owned a racetrack and many fine horses." Jackson and Butler discussed horses in their correspondence; Butler's track was located where the National Guard Armory stood in Jackson in 1946. Butler is considered by some to have been the founder of Jackson, Tennessee.

== See also ==
- Wards of Andrew Jackson

== Sources ==
- Folmsbee, Stanley J.; Catron, Anna Grace (1956). "The Early Career of David Crockett". East Tennessee Historical Society's Publications. 28. Tennessee Historical Commission, University of Tennessee. Knoxville, Tennessee: East Tennessee Historical Society: 58–85. ISSN 0361-6193. OCLC 1137265. FHL 1345572.
