= Robert Butler (U.S. commander) =

American army officer and associate of Andrew Jackson (1786–1860)

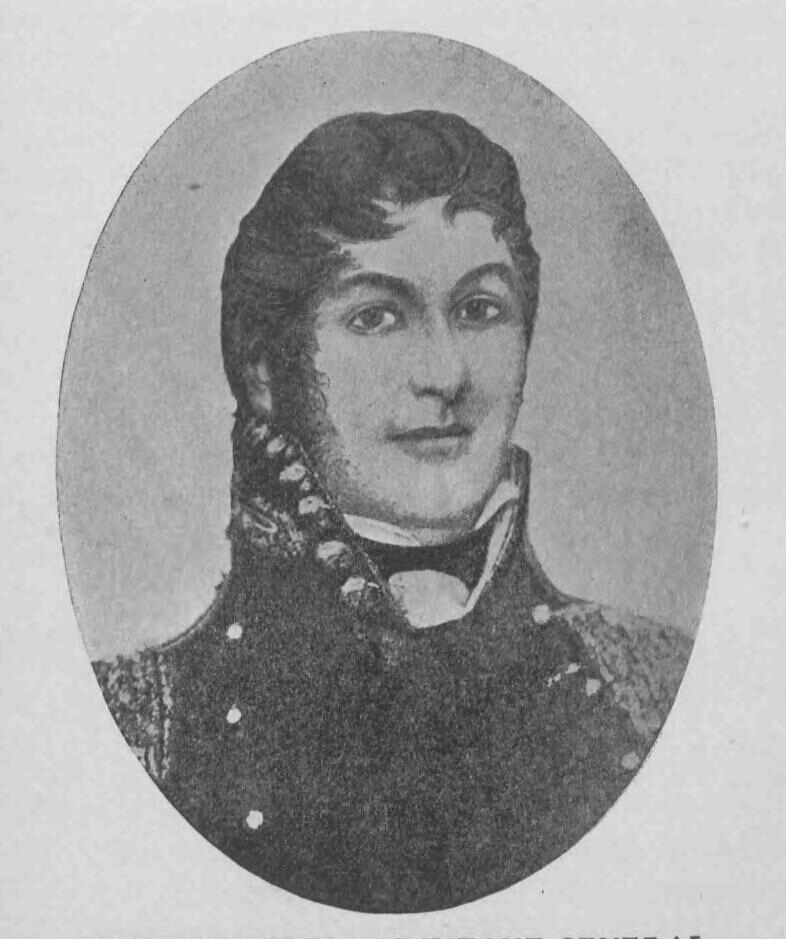
- Born: 29 December 1786
- Died: 13 January 1860 (aged 73); Tallahassee
- Occupation: Surveyor
- Parent(s): Thomas Butler

Robert Butler was an American military officer and acting governor of East Florida between 10 July 1821 and 11 July 1821, after Florida was ceded to the United States by Spain. He has been described as a "rather prominent" crony of Andrew Jackson.

== Biography ==
Robert Butler was born in 1786. In his youth, he joined the U.S. Army, attaining the ranks of colonel and commander.

Shortly after the death of his father Thomas Butler, Robert Butler and his siblings became wards of future president Andrew Jackson. He was a graduate of West Point and later served with distinction in the War of 1812. He served in the Battle of New Orleans as Jackson's adjutant. He was brevet lieutenant colonel following the battle. In 1818 he was secretary to the Treaty of Tuscaloosa negotiations with the Chickasaw.

Later, José María Coppinger delivered East Florida to Butler, who served as the representative of Jackson. He was named acting Governor of East Florida on 10 July 1821; but he was in charge for only two days, until the arrival of John R. Bell.

He was later appointed as the first surveyor general of the territory of Florida, "placed in a Florida office through Jackson's influence." When he came to Florida in November 1824, he brought with him two Tennesseans, Robert W. Williams and Isham G. Searcy, to serve as his clerks. He was one of three commissioners appointed to "conduct public sales of lots in the capital and to receive bids for the construction of public buildings" in Tallahassee. Butler, Richard Keith Call, and James Gadsden were considered part of the "Jacksonian group" in Florida politics. The opposing coalition was led by Joseph M. White, who was known for "uncovering land frauds in Pensacola, was becoming a symbol of the opposition to the land speculator."

Butler later settled on a plantation near Lake Jackson located to the north of Tallahassee.

Robert Butler died on June 12, 1860, in Florida. He is the namesake of the city of Lake Butler, Florida.

== See also ==
- St. Johns County, Florida - history

== Sources ==
- Doherty, Herbert J.; Jackson, Andrew (1955). "Andrew Jackson's Cronies in Florida Territorial Politics: With Three Unpublished Letters to His Cronies". The Florida Historical Quarterly. 34 (1): 3–29. ISSN 0015-4113.
