= Thomas Butler (soldier) =

Continental Army officer from Pennsylvania

Thomas Butler (1748–1805) was a Continental Army officer from Pennsylvania during the American Revolution. He was commissioned in the United States Army after the Revolution and rose to the rank of colonel.

== Family ==
He was the brother of Major General Richard Butler and Captain Edward Butler. All three brothers served in the American Revolution and in the Northwest Indian War against the Western Confederacy of Native American tribes in the Northwest Territories. Two other brothers, William and Percival, served in the Revolution but did not see later military service.

== American Revolutionary War ==
Butler was commissioned a 1st lieutenant in the 2nd Pennsylvania Battalion on January 5, 1776, and was promoted to captain in the 3rd Pennsylvania on October 4 of the same year. He resigned from the Continental Army on January 17, 1781.

In 1783 he became an original member of the Pennsylvania Society of the Cincinnati.

== Later military service ==
Butler was a major in the levies (i.e. militiamen conscripted for Federal service) under Major General Arthur St. Clair in the Northwest Territories in 1791. He was wounded in action near Fort Recovery, Ohio, on November 4, 1791, in St. Clair's Defeat. His brother, Brigadier General Richard Butler, was killed in the same battle.

He was commissioned in the Regular Army on April 11, 1792 as a major in the infantry. He was assigned to the 4th Sublegion on September 4, 1792. He was promoted to lieutenant colonel on July 1, 1794, commandant of the 4th Subregion. (Note: The 4th Sublegion was re-designated as the 4th Infantry Regiment on November 1, 1796.) In 1794, he commanded Fort Fayette at Pittsburgh, during the Whiskey Insurrection "and prevented the deluded insurgents from taking it more by his name than by his forces, for he had but few troops." In 1797 George Washington sent him to Tennessee "where it was necessary to dispossess some citizens who had imprudently settled on the Indian lands." According to one family history, "While in Tennessee he made several treaties with the Indians. In April, 1802, at the reduction of the army, he was continued as a colonel of the Second infantry regiment on the peace establishment."

== Hairstyle controversy ==
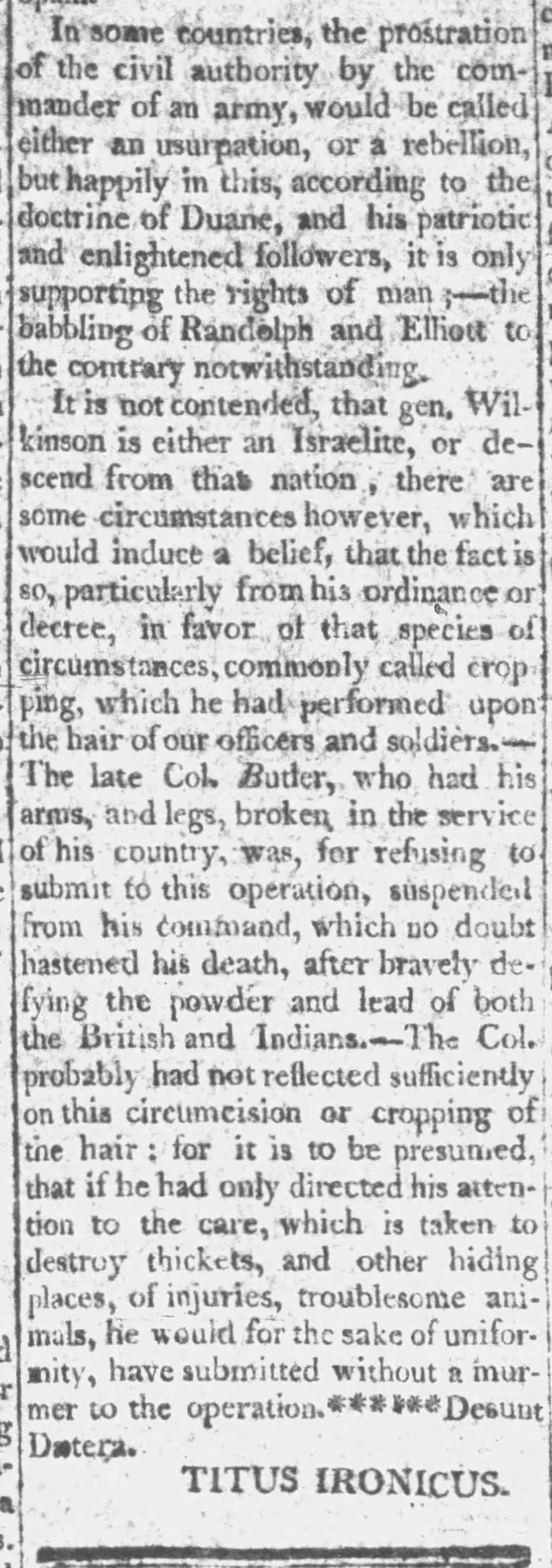
In 1807, "Titus Ironicus" was still ax-grinding about Butler's hair

On April 30, 1801, a General Order issued by Brigadier General James Wilkinson, Commanding General of the Army, abolished the queue as an acceptable military hairstyle, breaking the custom of a century. Butler applied for and was granted an exemption from the order.

Within two years, however, the exemption was mysteriously revoked and Butler stood before a court martial, which recommended a reprimand. Butler was promoted to colonel of the 2nd Infantry Regiment on November 1, 1802 and was assigned to New Orleans, and was again ordered to cut his hair. He again refused and was again before a court martial. He was found guilty of mutinous conduct, with a recommendation of a year's suspension. Within days of the verdict, Butler was ill with yellow fever.

On January 30, 1805 a petition was presented to the United States Senate signed by "sundry citizens and officers of the Militia of the State of Tennessee" asking that Colonel Butler be exonerated for failing to crop his hair, terming it "an illegal and arbitrary mandate". The petition referred to Butler as a "worthy, aged and respectable officer" and was signed by 73 individuals, mostly military officers, lawyers and merchants. The first signer of the petition was the commander of the Tennessee Militia, Major General Andrew Jackson. In August 1805, at a dinner at a Nashville tavern in honor of Aaron Burr, Jackson toasted to Butler, a "solddier, and citizen of honest worth. May the neroed arm of the executive, rescue this man from his present persecution."

== Death and descendants ==
Butler married Sarah Jane Semple, a daughter of Robert Semple and Lydia Steele of Pittsburgh, Pennsylvania. Her brother Steele Semple was a lawyer. Butler's wife, born Sarah Jane Semple, died near Nashville in March 1805. Butler died of yellow fever on 7 September 1805, at Ormond Plantation, owned by his nephew, in St. Charles Parish, Territory of Orleans (today's Louisiana). This was said to be the farm of Richard Butler, eight leagues above the city. He was survived by three sons and a daughter.

1. Thomas Butler Jr., judge of the Circuit Court at Bayou Sara, m. Ellis

1.1. Mary E. Butler

1.2. Pierce Butler, Confederate Army officer m. Stirling

1.2.1. Judge Thomas Butler, of Bayou Sara

1.2.2. Capt. James Butler, near Natchez, Mississippi

1.2.2.3. Pierce Butler Jr., professor of English literature at Tulane University

1.2.3. Anna Butler m. Henry Chotard Minor, of Southdown Plantation, Louisiana

1.3. Richard Butler, Confederate Army officer

1.4. Robert Butler, Confederate Army officer

1.5. Edward Butler, Confederate Army officer

2. Robert Butler m. Rachel Hays

3. William Edward Butler m. Patsy Thompson Hays

3.1. William Ormonde Butler, Mexican-American War officer

4. Lydia Butler m. Stockley D. Hays

== See also ==
- Thomas Langford Butler, similarly named nephew

== Sources ==
- Historical Register of Officers of the Continental Army during the War of the Revolution. Francis B. Heitman. 1914. pg. 138.
- Hickey, Donald R. (1976). "Andrew Jackson and the Army Haircut: Individual Rights vs. Military Discipline". Tennessee Historical Quarterly. 35 (4): 365–375. ISSN 0040-3261. JSTOR 42623606.
- Murray, J. A. (January 1883). "The Butlers of Cumberland Valley". Historical Register: Notes and Queries, Biographical and Genealogical Relating to Interior Pennsylvania. 1 (1). Harrisburg, Pennsylvania: Lane S. Hart: 1–17 – via University of Pittsburgh Libraries, Internet Archive.
- American Revolution Institute
