= Harriet Chappell Owsley =

American archivist and historian (1901–1999)

Harriet Chappell Owsley (July 26, 1901 – July 2, 1999) was an American historian and archivist who studied the U.S. South region. She was curator of manuscripts at the Tennessee State Library and Archives and was co-editor of the first volume of The Papers of Andrew Jackson.

== Biography ==
Born in Waco, Texas, she studied at Birmingham-Southern College and George Peabody College for Teachers. After she married historian Frank Owsley, the family lived on the campus of Vanderbilt University from 1920 to 1949. During the period 1939 to 1945, she worked with Blanche Henry Clark and Chase Mooney to create what are known as the Owsley charts, which are "a composite of Schedules I (land ownership), H (slave ownership), and IV (products of agriculture) of the unpublished Federal Census for Tennessee, 1850 and 1860."

The couple later lived and worked in Alabama and England. After his death in 1956, she returned to Nashville. She was heavily involved in the 1959 revision of F. Owsley's King Cotton Diplomacy. In 1963 she and a team of assistants started processing the manuscript collection at the Tennessee State Library. She was the editor in charge of the Guide to the Processed Manuscripts of the Tennessee Historical Society (1970). She was one of the co-editors of the first volume of the collected letters of U.S. president Andrew Jackson. Robert V. Remini made a point to credit her in the introduction to his Essays about Andrew Jackson: "Since I first met her in the manuscript room of the Tennessee Historical Library, she has assisted me in countless ways to find, decipher, transcribe, and edit Jackson manuscripts. She has read drafts of several of my books and offered criticisms and advice based on her long experience and expert knowledge of Tennessee history. She assisted her late husband in his research and writing, and I know from my own personal experience how much she must have contributed to the excellence of his distinguished monographs."

In 1991, she published a memoir/biography of her late husband. One reviewer described her husband as having "virulent Confederate sympathies" and noted that her Owsley profile "did not deal with her husband's white supremacist opinions, shared by nearly all of the Agrarians."

Harriet Chappell Owsley died in Nashville in 1999. Vanderbilt University Libraries holds a collection of her papers.

== Selected works ==
- Owsley, Harriet C. (1962). "Travel Through the Indian Country in the Early 1800s: The Memoirs of Martha Philips Martin". Tennessee Historical Quarterly. 21 (1): 66–81. ISSN 0040-3261.
- Owsley, Harriet Chappell (1977). "The Marriages of Rachel Donelson". Tennessee Historical Quarterly. 36 (4): 479–492. ISSN 0040-3261.
- Owsley, Harriet Chappell (1982). "Andrew Jackson and His Ward, Andrew Jackson Donelson". Tennessee Historical Quarterly. 41 (2): 124–139. ISSN 0040-3261.
- Various; Jackson, Andrew (1980). Smith, Sam B.; Owsley, Harriet Chappell; Moser, Harold D. (eds.). The Papers of Andrew Jackson, Volume I, 1770–1803. Knoxville, Tennessee: University of Tennessee Press. ISBN 978-0-87049-219-8. LCCN 79015078. OCLC 5029597.
- Owsley, Harriet Fason Chappell (1990). Frank Lawrence Owsley: historian of the Old South: a memoir. Nashville: Vanderbilt University Press. ISBN 978-0-8265-1243-7.
