= Stockley D. Hays =

Nephew of Andrew Jackson (1788–1831)

Stockley Donelson Hays
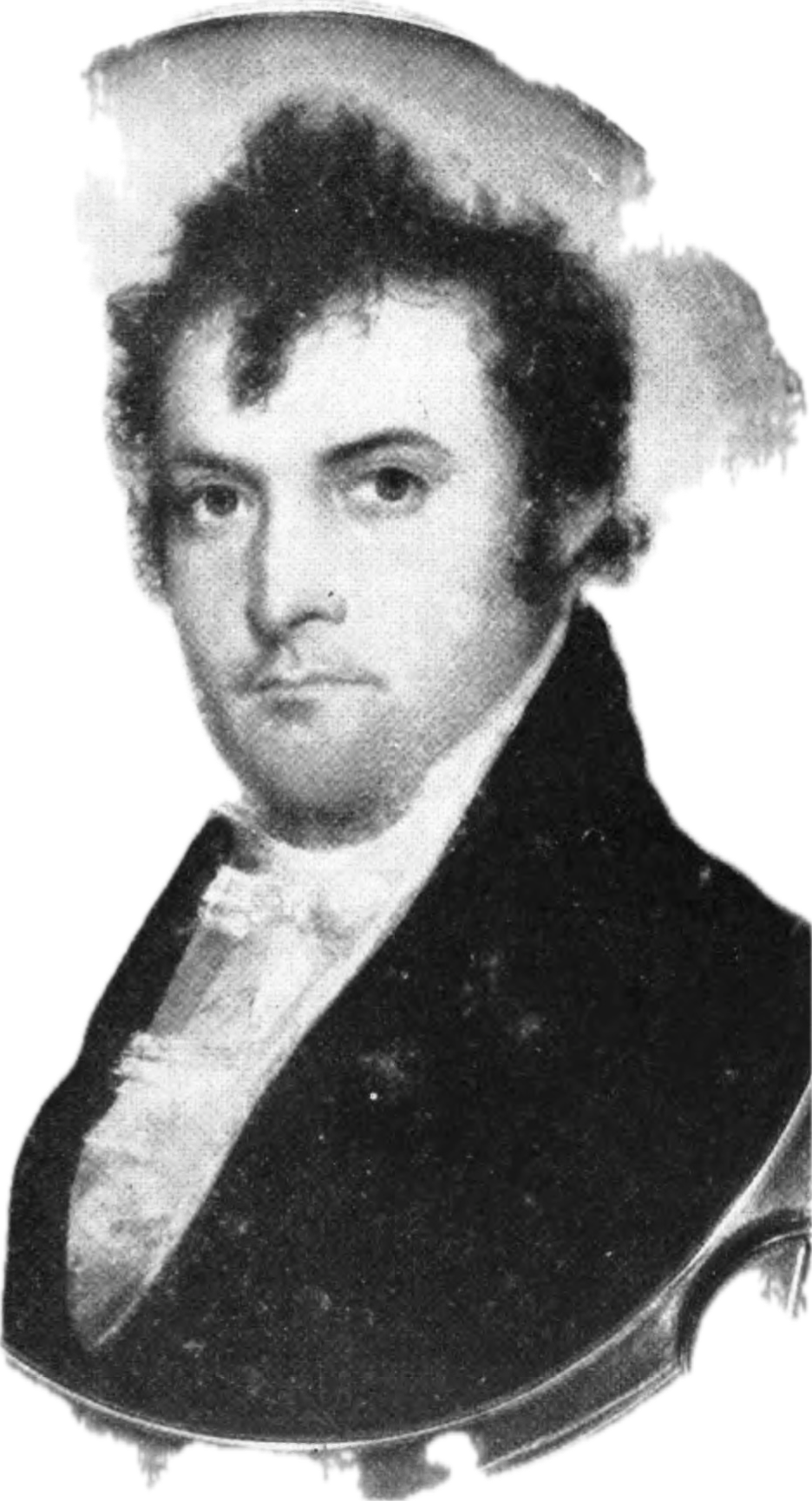
- Born: December 1788; Haysboro, western district of North Carolina (Tennessee)
- Died: September 8, 1831 (aged 42); Madison County, Tennessee, United States
- Other names: Stokely Hays, S. D. Hays, Col. Hays
- Occupation: Lawyer
- Parent(s): Robert Hays & Jane Donelson
- Relatives: Andrew Jackson (uncle), Rachel Donelson Jackson (aunt), John Coffee (cousin's husband), Samuel J. Hays (brother), Thomas Butler (father-in-law), Thomas Butler (brother-in-law), Robert Butler (brother-in-law), William E. Butler (brother-in-law), Robert I. Chester (brother-in-law)
- Family: Donelson family

Stockley Donelson Hays (December 1788 – September 8, 1831) was a 19th-century American lawyer, military officer, and nephew of U.S. president Andrew Jackson. Hays was involved in historically significant events from an early age. As a teenager he accompanied Aaron Burr down the Mississippi River during the Burr conspiracy of 1806–1807. He aided Jackson in a famous tavern brawl in Nashville, Tennessee in 1813. He served in Jackson's volunteer army as a quartermaster during the Creek War and in the larger southwestern theater of the War of 1812, and then he was made a judge advocate of the regular United States Army at the pay level of a major from 1816 to 1821.

Stockley D. Hays and several of his siblings intermarried with daughters and sons of Thomas Butler (of the so-called Fighting Butlers), who had become wards of Andrew Jackson after their father's death. The Hays and Butler families remained close to Jackson throughout his military and political campaigns. In the 1820s, the Hays and Butler families were founding settlers of Jackson, Tennessee, which was established shortly after the land was ceded under a Jackson-negotiated treaty with the Chickasaw people.

In 1831, following the ratification of the Treaty of Dancing Rabbit Creek between the Choctaw people and the United States government, U.S. president Jackson sought to appoint Hays to the high office of U.S. surveyor general south of Tennessee, which triggered a political conflict with Congressman Davy Crockett and U.S. Senator George Poindexter. Crockett, a fellow early settler of West Tennessee, described Hays as an ill-equipped alcoholic, but as a compromise between Poindexter and Jackson, Hays was appointed to be register of the land office at Clinton, Mississippi. Hays died of bilious fever shortly after being granted the post and never carried out any of the duties of the office.

== Early life ==
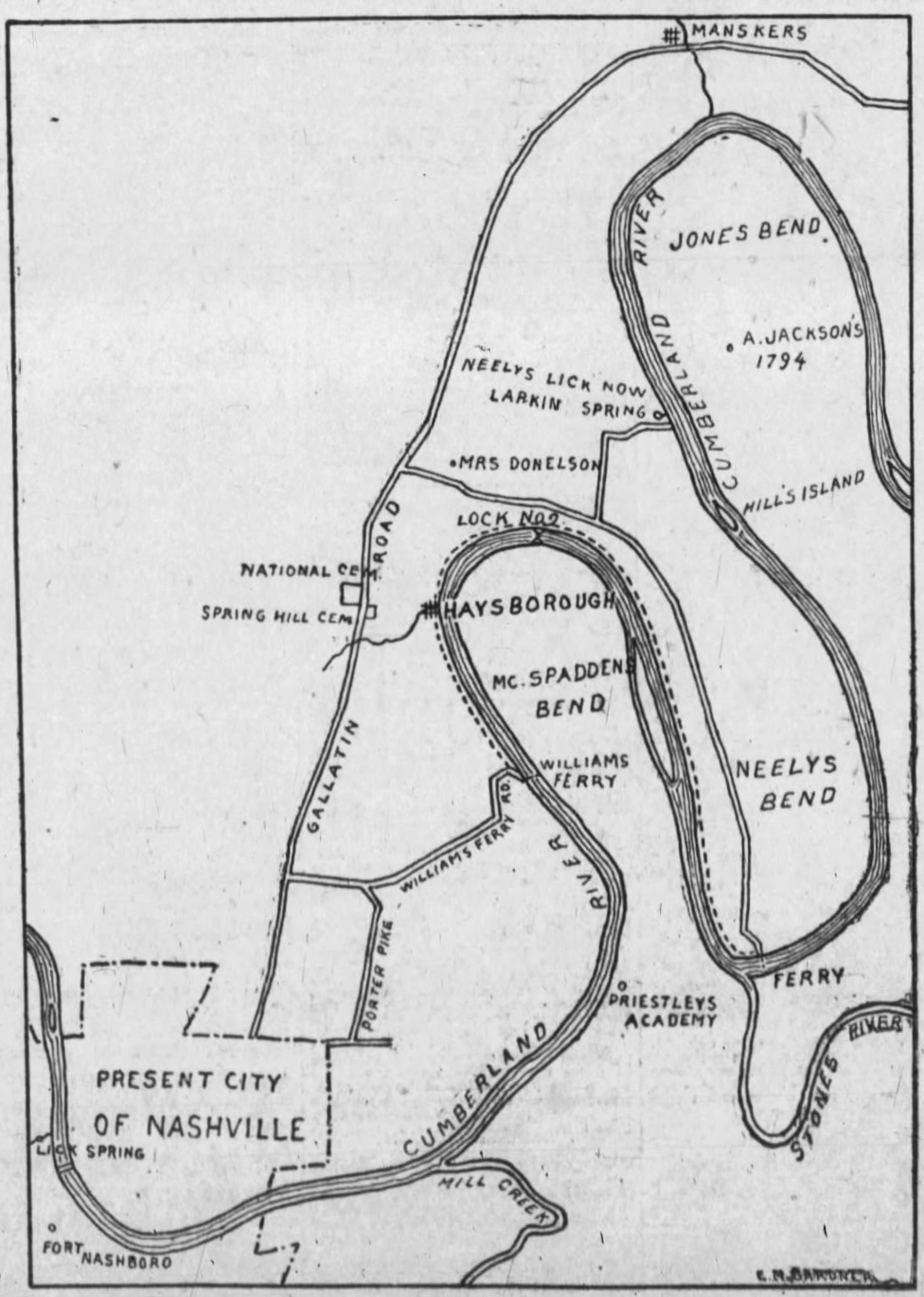
Old Haysborough, on the Cumberland River (Nashville Banner, 1912)

Stockley D. Hays was born in December 1788, the oldest of Robert Hays and Jane Donelson Hays's eight children. Jane Donelson Hays was a daughter of Nashville pioneer John Donelson and his wife Rachel Stockley. Hays' grandfather, Donelson, was shot and killed by persons unknown, possibly by Native Americans, in 1785, before Hays was born. Stockley D. Hays grew up at Haysborough, Tennessee, a frontier settlement founded by his father on what was called the McSpadden Bend of the Cumberland River, in the Mero District of North Carolina, which is now called Middle Tennessee. Robert Hays was a well-liked American Revolutionary War veteran, originally from North Carolina, who worked as a land surveyor and a plantation owner. In his capacity as a justice of the peace and a brother-in-law, the older Hays officiated Andrew Jackson's marriage to Rachel Donelson Robards in 1794. In 1797, Robert Hays was appointed to the government office of U.S. marshal of Tennessee by George Washington by the influence of then-Congressman Andrew Jackson. His aunt Mary Purnell Donelson's 1848 obituary told of her arrival at the future site of Nashville:

...the whole surrounding country exhibited the appearance of a dreary wilderness. No marks of reclaiming cultivation or of manual improvements could be seen. Nothing presented to the eye but a rough region of wood and cane, inhabited only by wild animals suited to the climate... For many years thereafter, the Indians continued to commit depredations upon the almost defenceless settlements on the Cumberland, which rendered them almost continually in danger. Nor were these savage incursions their only causes of distress and suffering; painful privations and actual wants were added to their other grievances.

An obituary for Hays' grandson stated that Hays worked as a private secretary to Jackson when Jackson lived at the Hunter's Hill property, between 1798 and 1804. In June 1806, when Hays was 17, the Davidson County sheriff listed for sale two properties for unpaid taxes; 640 acres (260 hectares) owned by Robert Hays, and 1,280 acres (520 ha) owned by Stokely D. Hays, both on the Caney Fork of the Cumberland River.

== Burr conspiracy ==
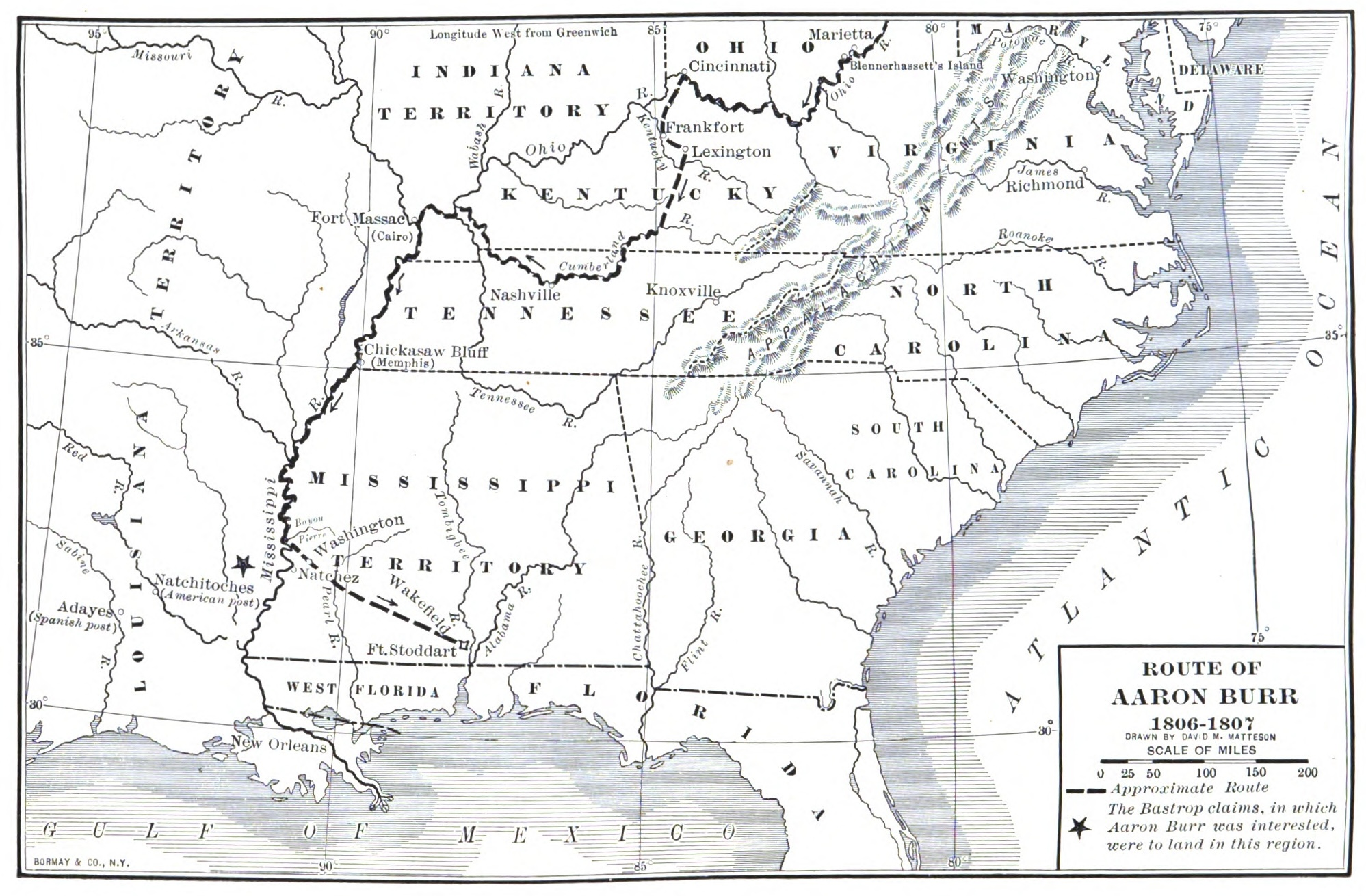
Route of Aaron Burr, 1806–1807 (The American Nation, 1907)

Later in 1806, when Stockley Hays was 18 years old, he was a part of former U.S. vice president Aaron Burr's 1806 Mississippi River expedition, known as the Burr conspiracy. Hays was recruited to the expedition by Patton Anderson, brother of Jackson's aide-de-camp W. P. Anderson. Andrew Jackson built and sold the flatboats that Burr used to navigate to the lower country. Per Mississippi judge Joseph Dunbar Shields, "If they were but flatboats, they were three deckers and had layers of muskets between decks." Weapons enough to outfit an army were never found, but as recounted in 1880 by Jacksonian Democrat, Claiborne family scion, and historian J. F. H. Claiborne, "At Burr's trial, Jacob Dunbaugh, a sergeant in the United States Army, who had obtained a furlough from his commanding officer at Fort Massac, and come down with Colonel Burr, swore that on the night the boats left Petit Gulf, he saw a man named Wylie pass into the stern of Colonel Burr's own boat with an augur and hand-axe, and that shortly afterwards he saw several bundles of muskets lowered into the river by cords, through a hole made in the gunwale of the boat".

According to a profile of the Hays family read to the Madison County Historical Society and republished in The Jackson Sun in 1944:

Jackson took the precaution to write a letter on behalf of Hays to Governor [William C.C.] Claiborne. Parton found a letter from the boy also, stating that he had been instructed that if anything inimical to the United States were intended, he was to return or place himself under the care of the governor.

One article claimed Hays was sent as an "aid" to Burr. Other accounts say Hays was going to be a private secretary to governor Claiborne. (Note: Claiborne's previous private secretary, his brother-in-law Micajah Green Lewis, had been killed in a New Orleans duel in February 1805. (Another of Claiborne's brothers-in-law, William Berkeley Lewis, became a leading utensil in Jackson's presidential Kitchen Cabinet.) The private secretary position was given to Claiborne's first cousin Richard D. Claiborne, who had most recently been the postmaster of Washington, M.T.) A third account says Hays went along because he was "preparing to enter school in New Orleans". Whatever the pretext, if the boatmen intended to make their way to the Neutral Ground, or Spanish Texas, American freebooters "who crossed international boundaries without passports were committing an act tantamount to invasion, illegal under national law and international custom". In December 1806, Burr used Hays to deliver a message for Harman Blennerhassett, informing him they should meet at the confluence of the Cumberland and Ohio Rivers on December 28, 1806. The boats arrived at judge Peter Bryan Bruin's landing on Bayou Pierre on January 10, 1807; Burr surrendered himself to the governor of Mississippi Territory on January 17. According to the editors of The Papers of Andrew Jackson, Volume II, after the Burr party landed, Hays connected with governor Claiborne's brother Ferdinand Leigh Claiborne, and territorial secretary of state Cowles Mead, at the territorial capital, Washington. The ambitious plan had already stumbled and buckled at the knees by the time Hays was welcomed by his kinsmen and his uncle's business friends in Mississippi Territory, but in full flower the plan might have involved "an invasion force from St. Louis to capture Santa Fé and open the way for a possible further advance overland into Mexico; a rallying of the Louisiana French who were none too pleased with their colonial status with respect to the United States; and a volunteer army to go down the Ohio, collecting recruits as it went and then, at New Orleans, reforming an amphibious expedition against Vera Cruz."

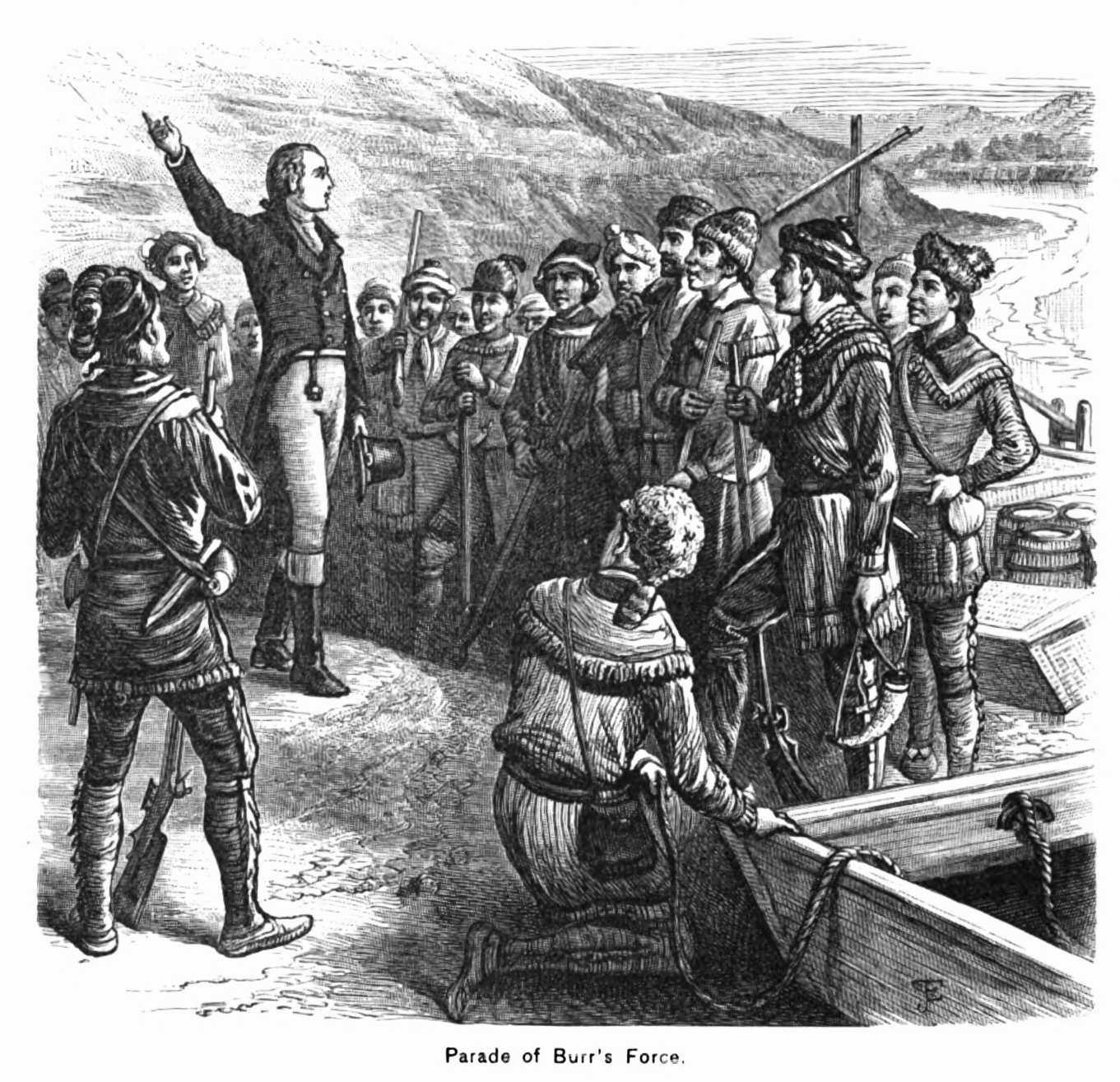
Conjectural image of Burr's expedition (Scribner's Popular History of the United States, 1896)

In April 1807, Hays sent a letter to Jackson's business partner John Coffee referencing December 1806: "Four months have now, with the setting of this days sun, elapsed since I parted with you at Clover Bottom. When you and all friends were doubtfull of my impending fate—when all was doubt, the question whether to go or not to go, you on whom I called as a friend and whose advise as such I received." On the same day he wrote to Coffee, Hays wrote to Jackson from Old Greenville:

I have lately been to Mr. A[braham] Greens, where I saw Uncle [John] Calfrey who has given me the History in detail of my friends since I left home; he mentioned the settlement of several of my fathers most unwise most distressing debts, which would in my fathers unhappy situations, have been inevitable distruction, had it not have been for your most friendly nay parental aid, which is ever ready in impending danger to ward off the theatning blow, from the inocent and ungarded; and for which you deservedly merit the esteem of every good citizen; (and as a party relieved permit me Sir to offer you my un feigned thanks, and ever gratefull services, too inconsiderable.)

Hays' uncle, John Caffrey, was married to another Donelson sister, Mary; according to descendants, Caffrey worked for Jackson in the "mercantile business" in the lower Mississippi River valley. Along with his 20-year-old future brother-in-law Thomas Butler, Hays was named on a May 1807 "List of Witnesses to be Summond against Aaron Burr," as "Thomas Butler the Son of the late Colonel" and "Stokely L. Hays Tennessee," respectively.

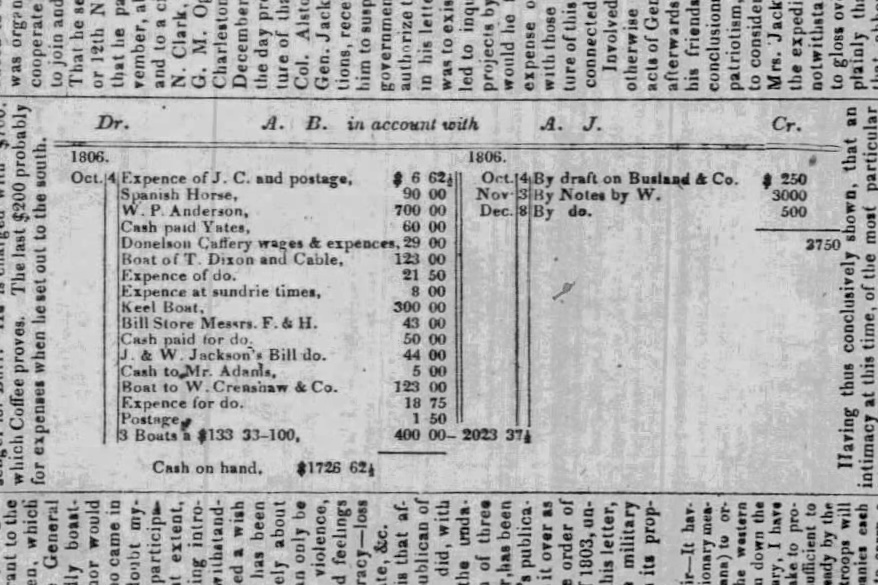
During the 1828 presidential election, opponents of Andrew Jackson published a document said to have been found in the papers of Harman Blennerhassett, showing "Aaron Burr in account with Andrew Jackson"; W. P. Anderson was Jackson's aide-de-camp, Donelson Caffery was a first cousin of Stockley D. Hays, and W. & J. Jackson were brothers Washington Jackson and James Jackson, merchants of Nashville and Natchez (Republican Banner, Nashville, October 11, 1828)

Hays and Jackson's involvement in the conspiracy was relitigated when Jackson ran for U.S. president against incumbent John Quincy Adams. In 1828, Judge John Overton, of Jackson's Nashville campaign committee, solicited a letter from Hays about the expedition. Hays claimed at that time Burr was an "intimate friend and brother officer" of his father from the American Revolutionary War, and that Burr had told Hays to consider him as another father. Hays wrote: "I observed to him that I must see and consult my friends before I gave my final consent. On advising with them some doubt of Mr. Burr's object was suggested, but he with having pledged his word of honor, that he had nothing in view hostile to the best interests of the United States, I determined to go with him." Hays said he parted ways with Burr when he turned himself in at Bruinsburg and "saw him no more except at a ball in Washington, Miss., and on his trial there before the court".

Around the same time and through the same venue (Overton to the newspapers in 1828), Felix Robertson, who was a founding member of the Nashville Central Committee to elect Jackson and whose father had pioneered the Cumberland with the Donelsons in the 1780s, wrote that Hays' local reputation had not been tarnished by his connection to Burr, that Burr had become "peevish" prior to his departure, and Burr had been complaining, before he left, of ill treatment by the people of Nashville. Robertson attested:

I always understood that Mr. Hays went against the advice and wishes of General Jackson. I have been intimately acquainted with Col. Hays from his infancy, and know he has always been in the habit of relying on his own judgment, and disposed to execute its decisions, independent of the opinions of others.

Jackson's business partner turned enemy Andrew Erwin characterized Hays' role as an escort "by General Jackson's favorite nephew by marriage". Another longtime Jackson hater said in 1828: "in 1823, John J. Bell Esquire lawyer from Pennsylvania, now of Franklin county Alabama, informed me that at the time Stokely D. Hays was in Natchez 1807, he told Bell that Jackson was to have had the command of 2000 men under Burr." James Wilkinson's great-grandson, New Orleans lawyer James Wilkinson, mentioned Hays when he argued to history in defense of his ancestor in 1935:

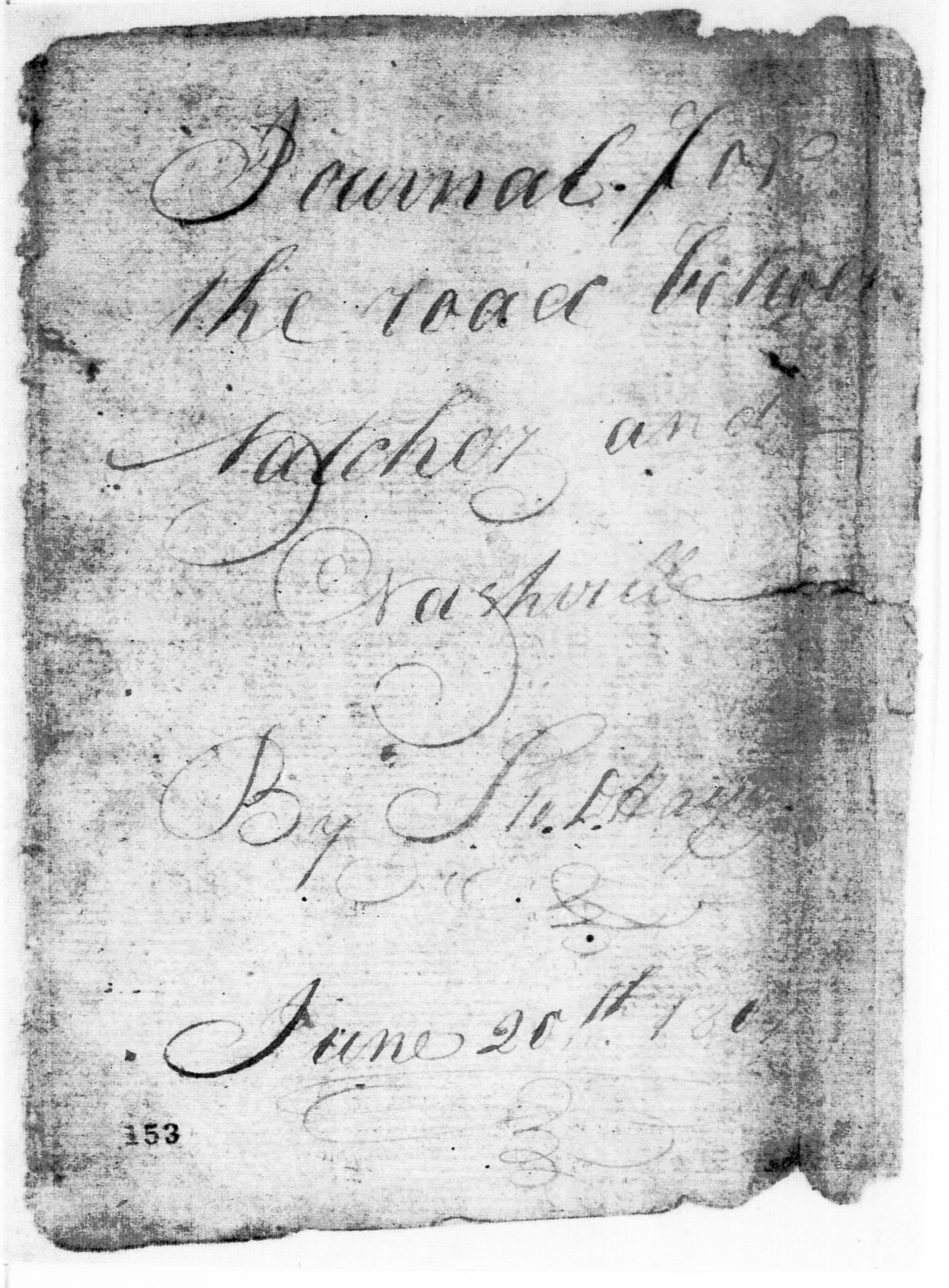
Stockley D. Hays kept a brief journal record of his return trip via the Natchez Trace in the summer of 1807 (hdl:loc.mss/maj.06158_0265_0271)

Jackson was as close to Burr as David was to Jonathan. He was fifty times closer to Burr than Wilkinson was. Jackson had entertained Burr royally and given him three magnificent receptions. Burr sent Jackson thirty-five hundred dollars to build his barges. He never sent Wilkinson thirty cents. Burr got Jackson's retainer, Patten Anderson, to raise a military company for him. Jackson sent Burr a list of officers for two regiments. In Burr's party was Stockley Hays, a nephew of Mrs. Jackson...Stockley Hays was young when he went with Burr but he surely had the making of a peaceful colonizer in him. Jackson knew twenty times as much about Burr's future intentions and movements as Wilkinson did, and yet, after the most careful study, I do not believe that either Jackson knew, before November 10th, 1806, or Wilkinson knew before October 9th, 1806, that Burr planned to divide the Union as revealed by Swartout to both Wilkinson and Fort, and revealed by the latter November 10th, 1806, to Jackson. It is impossible to escape the conclusion, from the proven facts, that Jackson knew Burr was setting on foot an expedition in violation of the criminal laws of the United States...This statute was drafted by Alexander Hamilton and was adopted on June 5th, 1794. The vote in the Senate was so close that the Vice President cast the deciding vote. This law made it a criminal offense to fit out, arm, or prepare an expedition to invade a country with which this country was at peace. Burr and Jackson were aware of this law, as both were members of Congress shortly afterwards. Why was Patten Anderson, Jackson's Fidus Achates, raising a military company? The answer is contained in Jackson's letter to Claiborne, 'I would delight to see the Dons reduced.' Jackson was an expansionist, and there is no question he had a large part in conquering and acquiring Florida and in getting Texas admitted as a State. It is remarkable that some writers who adopt Jackson's denunciation to Secretary of War Dearborn in January, 1807, that Wilkinson was 'a traitor to a traitor,' see nothing strange for Jackson to have travelled later to Richmond to declare on every corner that Burr was no traitor at all, and that Jefferson and Wilkinson were persecuting a good man.

Preliminary investigation by U.S. attorney for the District of Kentucky Joseph Hamilton Daveiss concluded that "Mexico was Burr's first object, the Mississippi territories second, and the Ohio country third" and that "Burr's allies did not seem to think that the [Jefferson administration] opposed their plans." A Mississippi federal judge, Thomas Rodney, wrote to his son Caesar Augustus Rodney: "... the existence of a plot was universally credited by all sorts of people ...The Design of the Conspiracy is said to be to unite Kentucky, Tennessee, Louisiana, The Floridas, and part at least of Mexico into an Independent Empire." William Duane of the Philadelphia Aurora, described by historian Thomas P. Abernethy as "the best-informed editor on the conspiracy", wrote that "such a spirit of speculating rapacity throughout the nation has formed a mass of corruption in every state of the Union, which menaces the safety of the nation". Abernethy endorsed Duane's belief that Hays, Burr, and the rest were party to a poorly conceived continent-spanning land-speculation scheme backed by hopeful Yazoo land investors, which would have increased the value of Burr's Bastrop claim and forced open other lands for settlement. Historians remain frustrated by the opacity of the plot; in the words of Abernethy: "The whole trouble with the Burr Conspiracy is that there were too many liars mixed up in it". United States Military Academy history professor Samuel J. Watson wrote in 2012 that "many senior army officers, including the commanding general himself, James Wilkinson, were closely linked to leading intriguers and filibusters like Aaron Burr...the tumultuous first decade of the 19th century set the stage for Andrew Jackson's usurpation of civilian authority" during the period 1810 to 1821.

== Tavern brawl, Creek War ==
Hays married Lydia Butler in Davidson County, Tennessee, in early 1811. (Note: Lydia Butler was born March 9, 1788.) Lydia Butler was a daughter of Thomas Butler, one of the five "Fighting Butlers" of the American Revolutionary War and Northwest Indian War. She was educated at the Moravian Seminary in Bethlehem, Pennsylvania. When Lydia Butler's father died in 1805, Andrew Jackson became her guardian. Three of the Hays siblings married three of the Butler siblings: Stockley married Lydia, Robert Butler married Rachel Hays, and Dr. William E. Butler married Martha Hays. Lydia's brother and Stockley Hays' brother-in-law Robert Butler became one of Jackson's closest associates during the push into Florida in the 1810s and 1820s.

In 1810, 22-year-old Stockley Hays and 28-year-old future U.S. Senator Thomas Hart Benton both served as junior counsel to Jenkin Whiteside at the trial of the Magnesses for killing Patton Anderson. Hays was admitted to the bar of Davidson County in 1812.

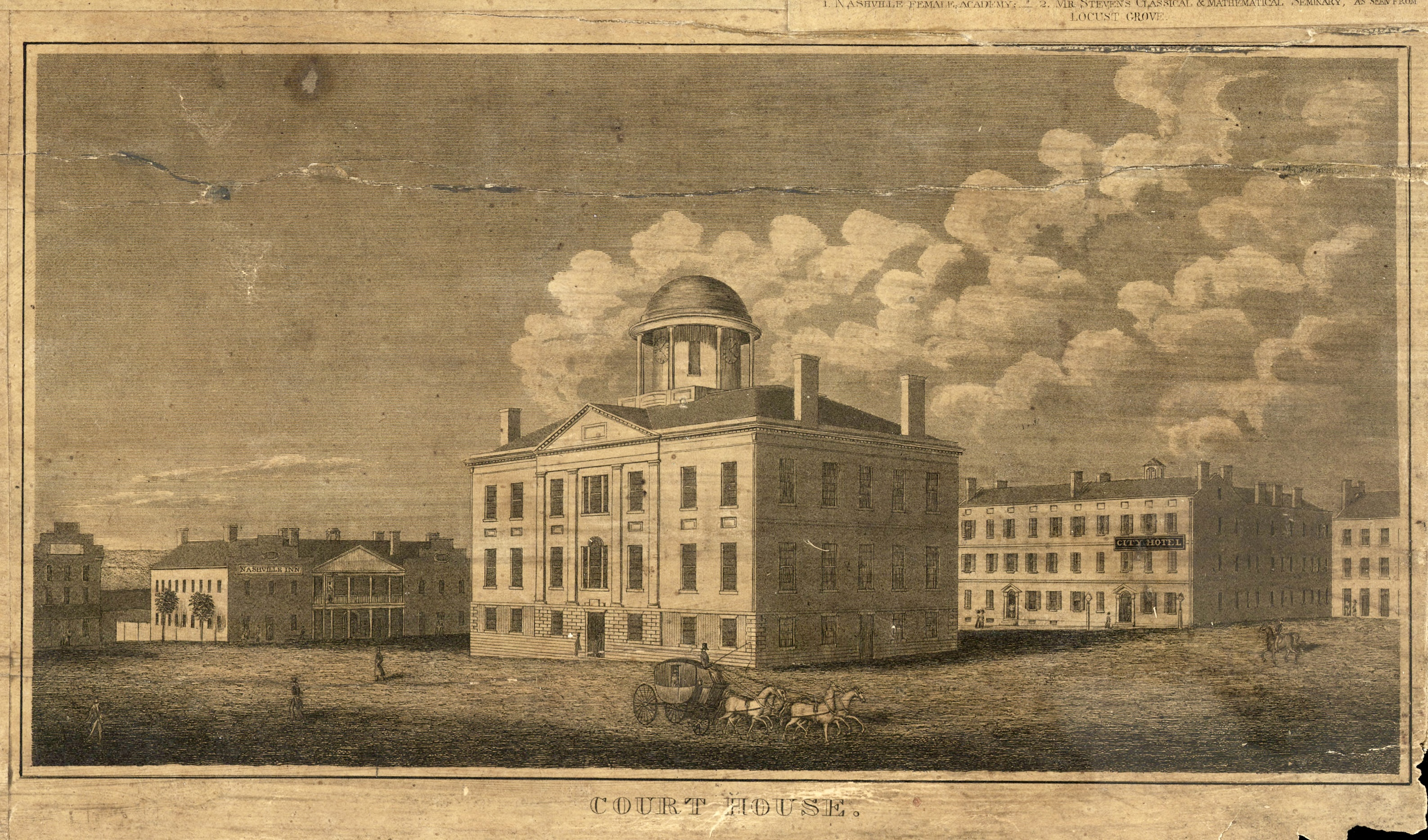
As they appeared in 1831, Nashville Inn, Davidson County Courthouse, and the City Hotel

During the Creek War, a subconflict of the War of 1812, Hays was commissioned as a quartermaster in the Tennessee militia from October 1, 1812, to April 1, 1814, serving as paymaster of Tennessee Volunteers, and quartermaster general of Jackson's army.

During a lull in hostilities, on September 4, 1813, Hays participated in a fight in a downtown Nashville tavern; Thomas Hart Benton's brother Jesse Benton shot Andrew Jackson, and Hays "nearly killed" Jesse Benton. According to the footnotes of Tom Kanon's history of Tennessee military participation in the War of 1812: "Four other pistols were fired in quick succession—one by Jackson at Benton, two by Benton at Jackson, and one by John Coffee at Thomas Benton—but Jackson was the only one hit. Then daggers were drawn." John Coffee and cousin Alexander "Sandy" Donelson jumped in and stabbed the future Senator five times. Stockley Hays stabbed Jesse Benton with a knife concealed within a cane, while Captain Eli Hammond beat J. Benton about the head, but "a large and strong button which broke Hays' blade saved Jesse from being perforated. Jesse placed the muzzle of his remaining pistol against Hays' chest and pulled the trigger, but in a fair exchange of mishaps, the charge failed to explode." (Note: James Sumner intervened on behalf of the Bentons, helping them driving off Hays and Donelson.) Jackson's urgent need for medical attention ended the fight; T. H. Benton "sealed the victory by breaking Jackson's sword across his knee in the public square" and later pamphleteered about the brawl, explaining his side of the story.

On November 22, 1813, with the Creek War well underway, Jackson ordered quartermaster Hays to procure more pack horses. As framed by historian Natalie Inman:

Like their Chickasaw and Cherokee allies, Andrew Jackson and John Coffee drew upon their kinship network to fill the ranks with trusted family members. Jackson and Coffee had been friends for decades and had recently become related by marriage when Coffee married Jackson's niece. Jackson's brother-in-law, Robert Hays, was the muster master and deputy inspector general for the West Tennessee militia during the Creek War. Jackson's nephews served in strategic support positions: Maj. Alexander Donelson (Jackson's aide who was killed in the Battle of Emuckfaw during the Creek War); Stockley Donelson Hutchings (quartermaster sergeant in Coffee's cavalry regiment); Stockley Donelson Hays (quartermaster general for Jackson's army); Lt. John Donelson Jr. (company captain for Coffee's mounted infantry at the Battle of New Orleans); Lt. Thomas Hutchings (often a messenger for the family); and Maj. Robert Butler (nephew by marriage, brevet colonel and Jackson's adjutant general through 1821). Although Jackson and Coffee commanded thousands of nonkin, their family ties encouraged them to place family in positions of power, creating interesting parallels between their commands and the kin-based war parties of the Colberts and The Ridge.

Hays drew US$1,000 (equivalent to $15,357 in 2025) for contingent expenses on June 20, 1814, the same day Jackson drew US$2,000 (equivalent to $30,714 in 2025). Hays served as lieutenant and brigade inspector to Coffee's mounted gunmen from September 11 to November 17, 1814. Beyond accounts of the brawl at Talbot's Hotel, Hays makes no appearance in standard histories of the conflict—such as Old Hickory's War by the Heidlers (1996) or Kanon's Tennesseans at War, 1812–1815—so it is impossible to describe his combat experience or lack thereof. General Jackson did task "Col. Hays" (meaning either Stockley or his aged but active father Robert) with transporting the orphaned baby Lyncoya to the Hermitage after Lyncoya's parents were killed at Tallusahatchee.

== Enslavement and trafficking ==
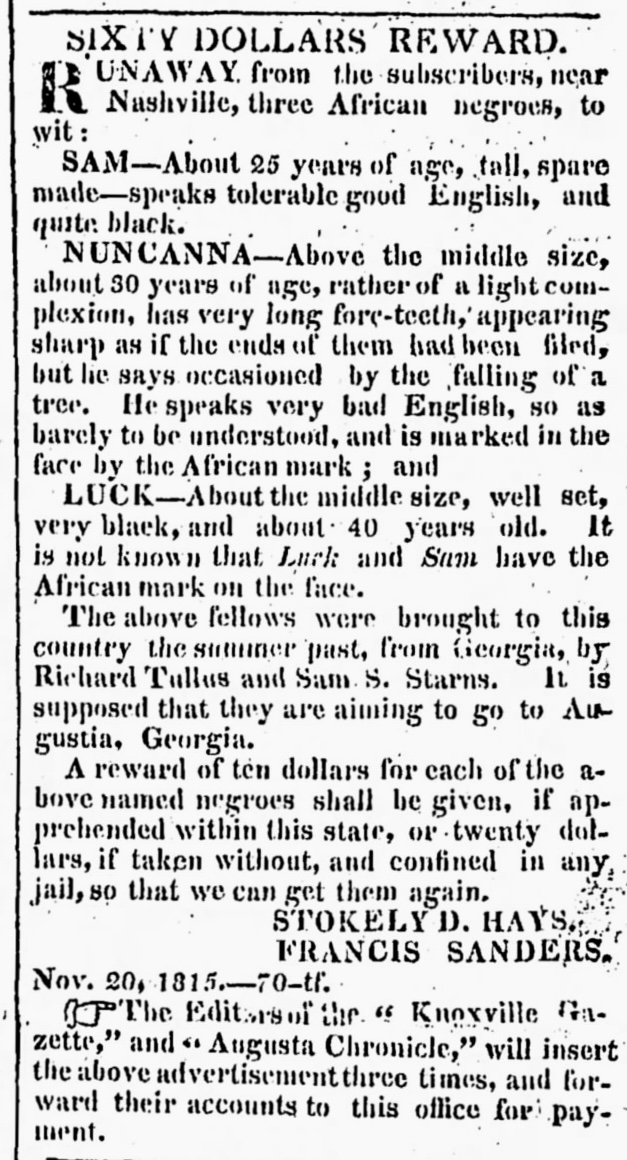
Over the course of their lives, Sam, Nuncanna, and Luck were trafficked from Africa, to Augusta, Georgia, to Nashville, where they escaped Hays and his business partner Francis Sanders (Nashville Whig, November 28, 1815)

In November 1815, Hays placed a runaway slave advertisement in the Nashville Whig newspaper, offering a reward of $20 each for the recovery of Sam, Nuncanna, and Luck, African-born enslaved men ranging in age from 25 to 40 who had been taken to Nashville mid-year from Augusta, Georgia, by Richard Tullus and Sam. S. Starns. Two of the three men were recaptured near Knoxville in the eastern section of the state in February 1816 but then escaped again; Hays renewed the reward offer in June 1816. (Note: The description of Nuncanna suggests his community of origin practiced ritual scarification and human tooth sharpening (akuha, known in Cameroon, Congo, DRC, Guinea, and Uganda, is a body modification where teeth were filed to resemble those of a crocodile).) (Note: Hays' partner Francis Sanders was killed in 1826 by an employee who confessed and was hanged for the crime.)

== U.S. Army Judge Advocate ==
On September 10, 1816, (Note: Some sources place his appointment in 1818.) Hays was appointed to the position of judge advocate of the regular U.S. Army, with "brevet rank, pay, &c. of a major of cavalry". This was a military lawyer job with the "pay and emoluments of a topographical engineer". Hays and his brother-in-law Robert E. Butler are believed to have made a "prospecting journey" to the lands ceded under the 1818 Chickasaw treaty in 1819. Stockley Hays' father, Robert Hays, died in 1819, leaving a widow and surviving offspring who ranged in age from 31 (Stockley D. Hays) to 19 (Samuel J. Hays). His sister Narcissa Hays never married. In her youth, she sometimes served as a traveling companion for her Aunt Jackson, for instance, traveling with the family to recently captured Pensacola in 1821. In later life, as Aunt Nar, she raised her grandnephew and taught him how to fish.

Hays continued to serve as a judge advocate in the U.S. Army's Division of the South until at least 1820, during which time Jackson was a major general. Hays was judge advocate for the court martial of William King at Fort Montgomery, Alabama, in November 1819. The United States Congress reduced funding for the military and made no appropriation for army lawyers, so Hays was the "last judge advocate of the Southern Division ... honorably discharged on June 1, 1821, and the Army did not have a full-time statutory judge advocate again until 1849".

== West Tennessee ==
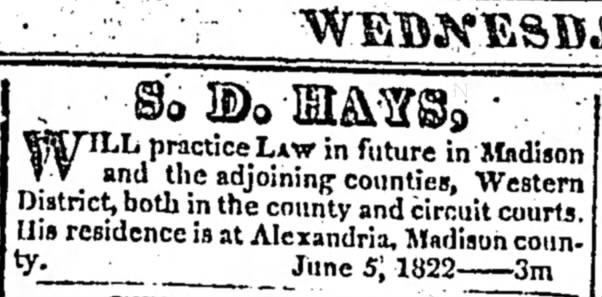
Hays was licensed to practice law in the "Western District" in June 1822 (Nashville Whig, August 21, 1822)

As of January 1822, Stockley Hays was living on a Tennessee farm called Greenvale that had been formerly owned by merchant banker James Jackson. Greenvale was located "on the main road from Nashville to Haysboro and two miles from the former place". In the first week of May 1822, six weeks after the birth of his son, Hays was one of the co-founders of the town of Jackson, Tennessee, originally named Alexandria. He and Thomas Taylor, Austin Miller, William Stoddert, William Arnold, Archibald Hall, and James Wilson, were authorized to practice law in Madison County, Tennessee, on June 17, 1822. Hays was on the board of the Jackson Male Academy, and the Madison County board of commissioners. He struggled financially, possibly unable to pay debts, after the Panic of 1819. In January 1823, a newspaper notice announced the dissolution of the business partnership of S. D. Hays and James F. Theobald. In May 1824, Hays and Robert Hughes announced the establishment of a legal partnership in Jackson, Tennessee. Jackson was "for some years the largest community in the Western District" of Tennessee.

== Jackson administration ==
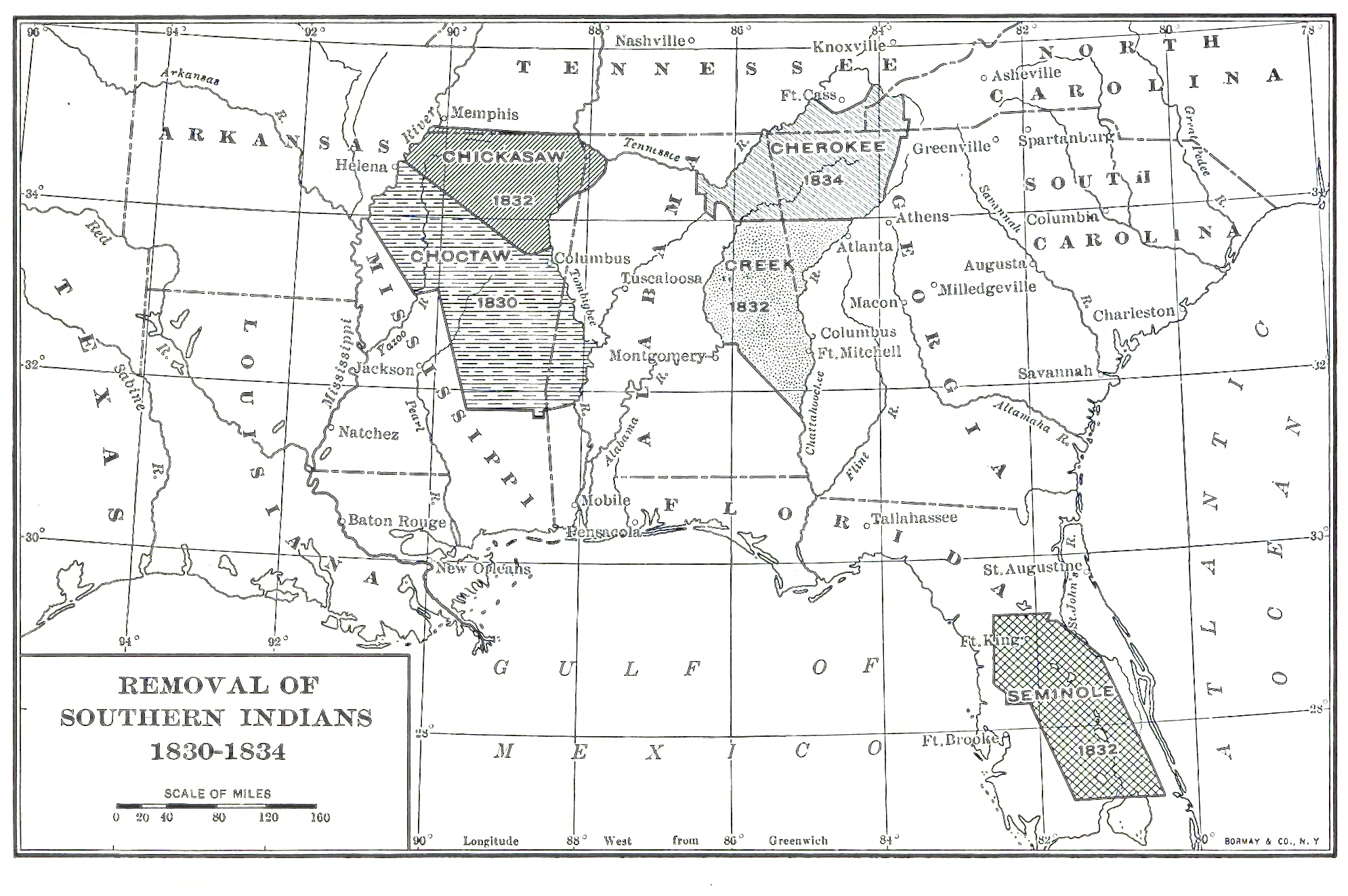
"Removal of the Southern Indians, 1830–1834" (The American Nation, 1907)

In September 1830 Samuel J. Hays, the youngest sibling of Stockley Hays, wrote President Jackson a letter reporting his first son had been born healthy and "with very black hair", that a drought would diminish the cotton crop, and: "We have neither seen nor received the scrape of a pen from brother since he went to see you at Nashville—begin to fear he must be sick, tho' I suspect he must be detained by the Federal court where he was summonsed as a witness—he might have written however." A week later, Stockley Hays advised Jackson by letter: "... many of our good orderly, but enterprising citizens intend forthwith, to move over on to the Chickisaw lands to procure occupant claims—There is a treaty stipulation to prevent this procedure—Until the U States troops can arrive, Would it not be well to issue your proclamation on the subject—to prevent the great mischief which may otherwise ensue."

The treaty between the United States and the Chickasaw (Chikashsha) had a clause preventing sale of land prior to removal but there was no clause prohibiting settlers from squatting on the land prior to the tribe's expulsion. Jackson wrote in the letter: "The acting Sec. of war will instruct the chikisaw agent to forewarn all person from moving to, or intruding on the chikisaw lands assuring them that they all trespassers will be removed from it and their houses burnt & every thing destroyed." Chickasaw subagent John L. Allen reported to Secretary of War John Eaton the threat had been duly transmitted, and that some "Obstinate Intruders" were removed, and that military intervention would not be necessary. In October 1830, Jackson wrote to Samuel J. Hays: "Colo Stockely travelled a few miles with me the morning I set out, I intend to [do] something for him as soon as it can be with propriety, but you know, under such a pressure for office, how hard it is to get a connection in, without great censure—I am astonished that he had not returned before the date of your letter, as he told me he would go directly home—he was in fine health."

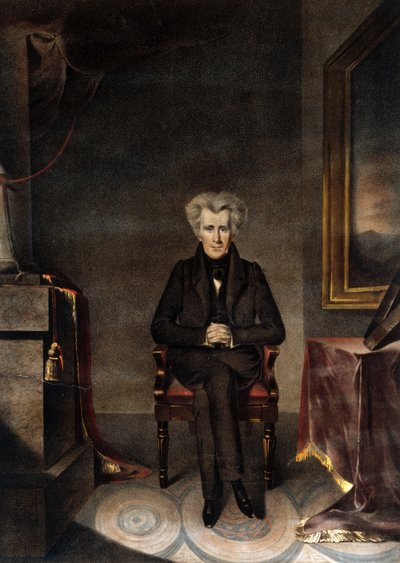
Andrew Jackson by William James Hubard, painted sometime from 1832 to 1835

When Jackson became president of the United States following the 1828 election, he removed James Turner from the United States General Land Office job of Surveyor General South of Tennessee, responsible at that time for the surveys of Louisiana and Mississippi, and wanted to appoint 42-year-old Hays to the post. On November 7, 1830, Jackson wrote to Hays' brother-in-law Robert I. Chester. Jackson offered to sell Chester an enslaved mother named Charlotte and her children, Aggy, Jane, and Maria, for US$800 (equivalent to $24,188 in 2025), and he described a possible patronage position for Hays:

I wish you to say to Colo. S. D. Hays, that he must get, & send on here, as early as he can, testimonials of his sobriety & capacity as a survayor; This will be necessary, for so sure as an opportunity offers if one should, to give him a survayers District, that in order to mortify me that his appointment will be opposed in the Senate & Davy Crockett & [Robert] Desha, will represent him as intemperate. Let the recommendations be strong and go to his capacity and ability to give the necessary security, if required. This must be attended to early to be here by the middle or 20th. of Decbr next if practicable.

Brief letters of recommendation were sent from the vicinity of Nashville, stressing Hays' "scientific qualifications and self-sacrificing Army service in and after the War of 1812", signed by Thomas Claiborne, Robert Armstrong, John Overton, William Carroll, Robert Whyte, Parry W. Humphreys, Ephraim H. Foster, Robert Purdy, James Collinsworth, Thomas H. Fletcher, Samuel Hogg, John C. McLemore, Adam Huntsman, and others.

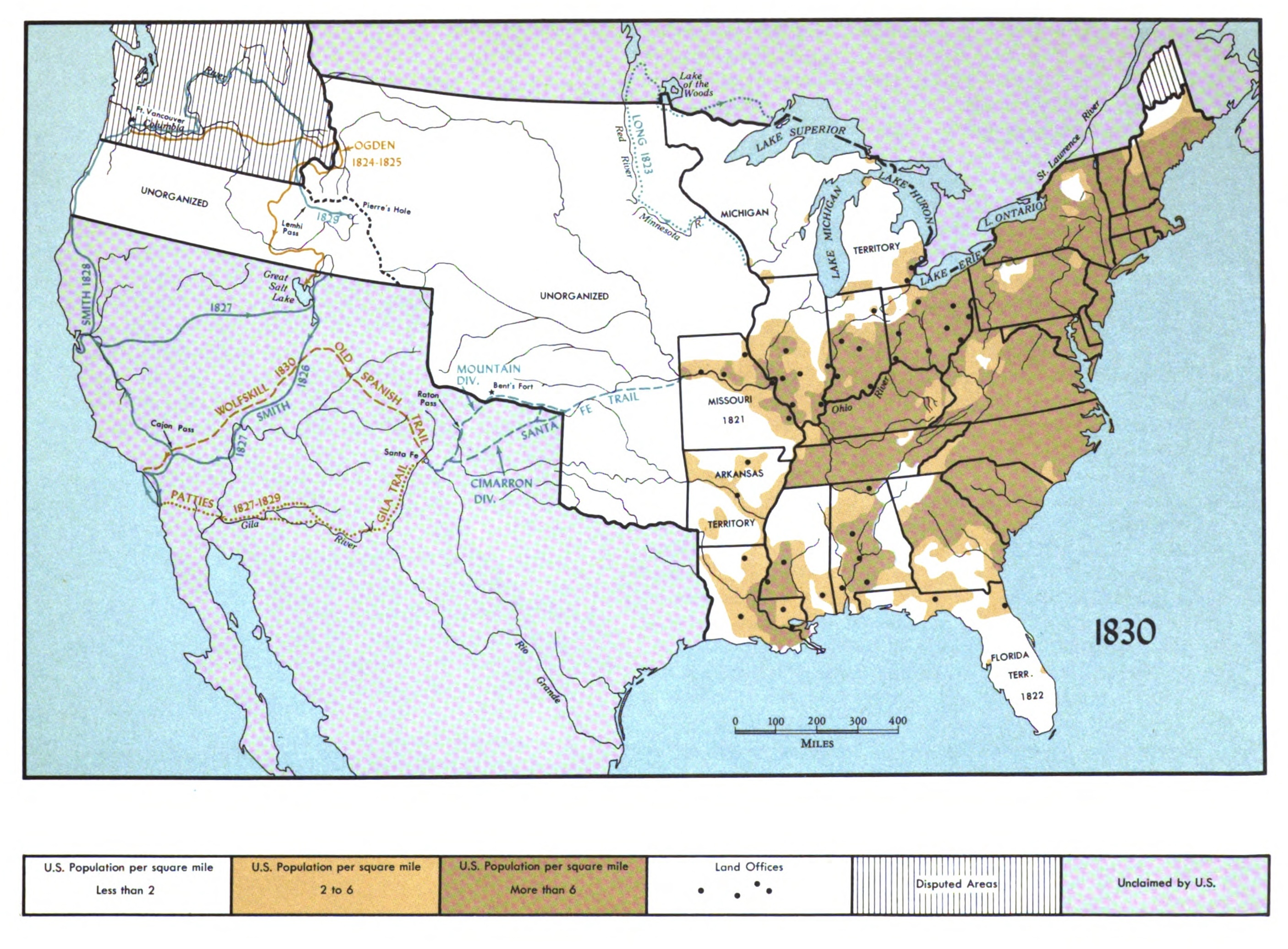
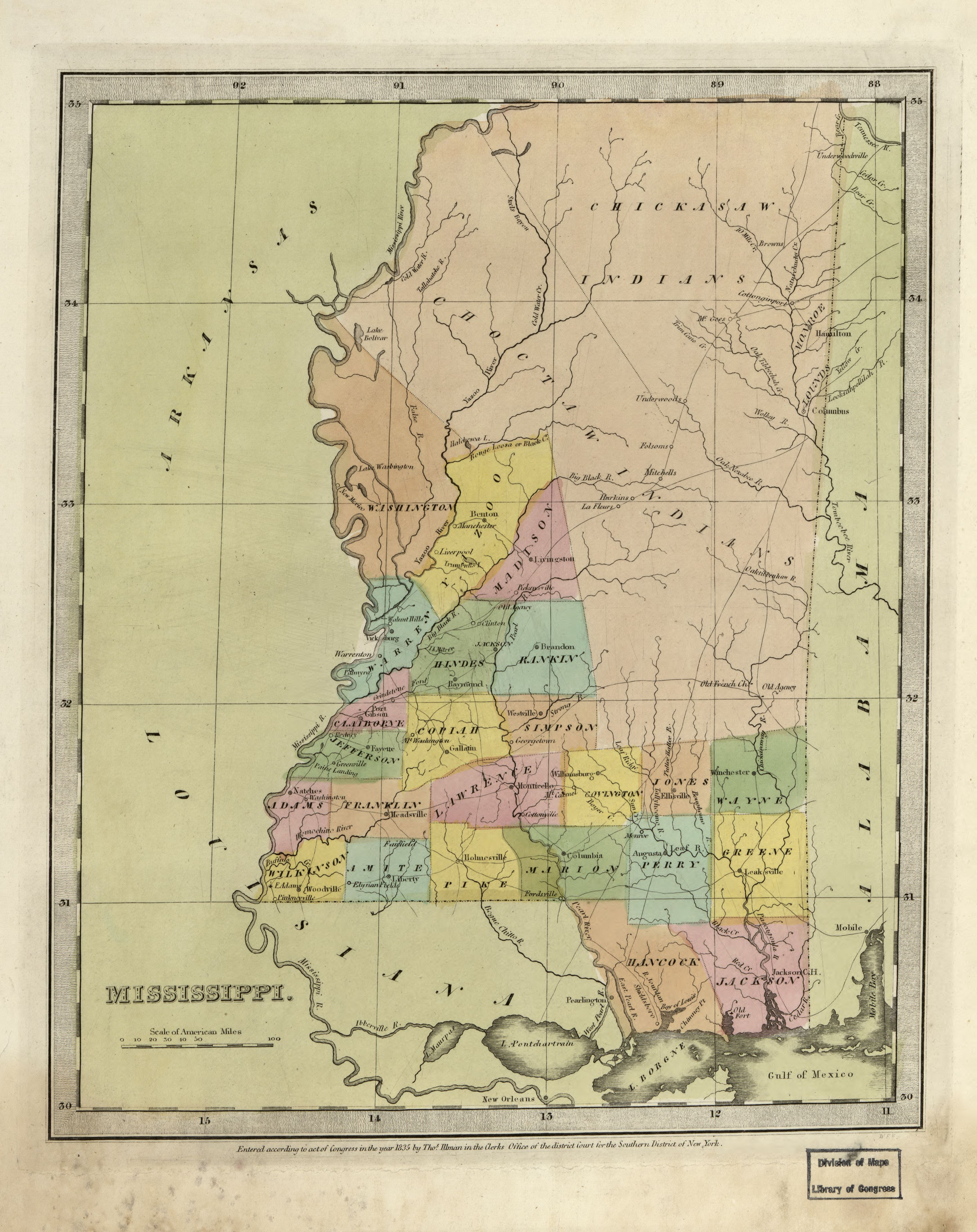
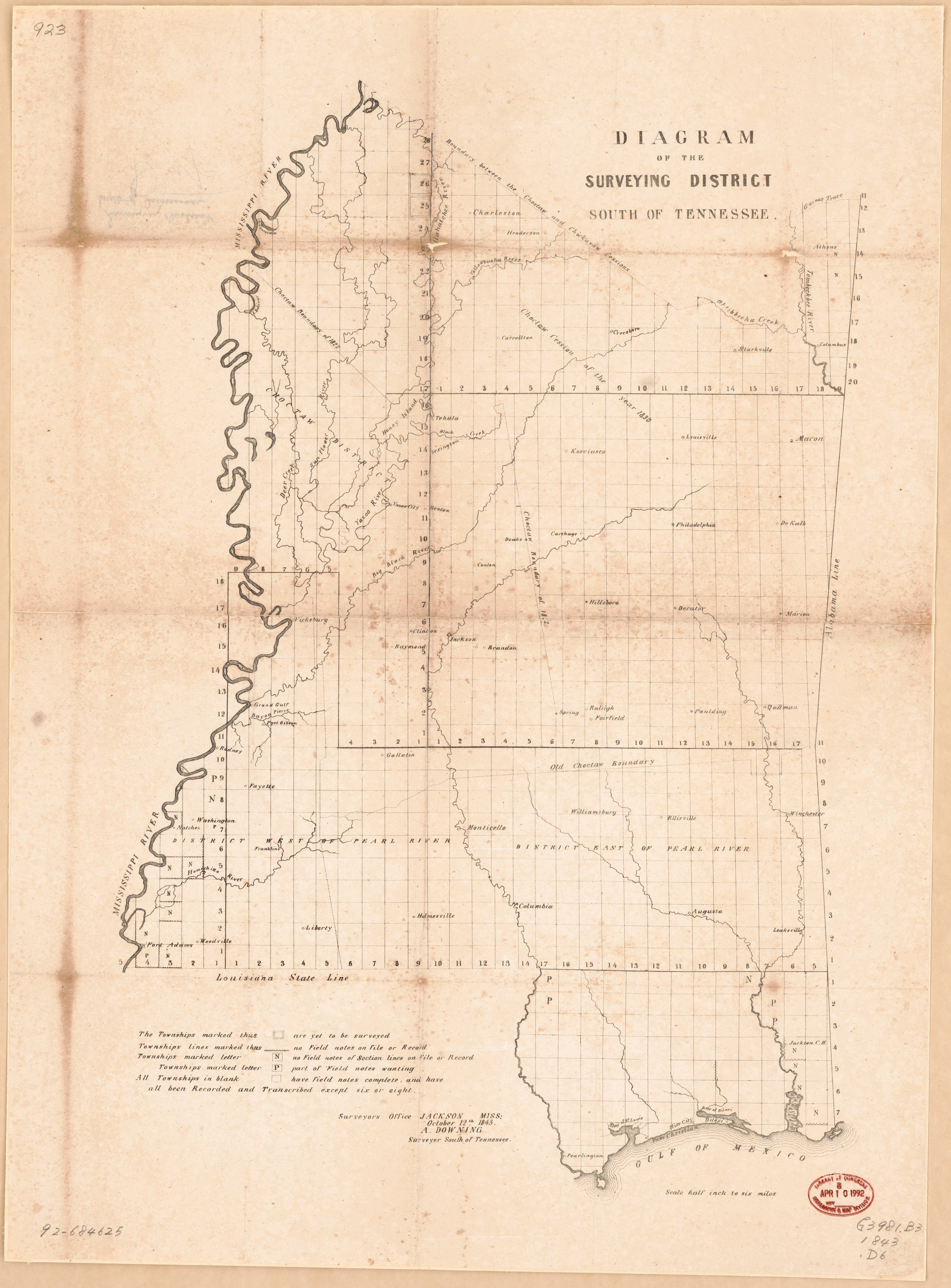
Top: Map of the United States in 1830, showing population density and locations of General Land Offices; the white areas in the south and west are unceded sovereign Indigenous lands (American Expansion Maps, 1962), bottom left: Mississippi before the subdivision of the lands from which the Indians were removed during the Andrew Jackson administration (hdl:loc.gmd/g3980.ct003476), bottom right: "Surveying district south of Tennessee" showing boundary lines of Chickasaw and Choctaw cessions, created by Alexander Downing (hdl:loc.gmd/g3981b.ct010758)

In January 1831, David Barton, the chairman of the U.S. Senate Committee on Land Surveys, inquired with the Tennessee delegation about their constituent and neighbor's fitness for federal appointment. According to the editors of The Papers of Andrew Jackson: "All the replies but Crockett's were noncommittal". Crockett said Hays had lived in his Congressional district for about eight years, since approximately 1823, but he could not fairly estimate his "mathematical ability" and skill at land surveying. Crockett said Hays had "succeeded badly in finding employment" as an attorney, was bankrupt, and "his want of Sobriety is So great that on the other hand he is notorious for intemperance—bordering on Sottishness." Crockett concluded his reply with: "You fourthly and Conclusively enquire whether from my knowledge of Hays taking all together I think him qualified and a Suitable person for the office? I answer emphatically I do not[.]"

Jacksonian newspapers attacked Crockett for his opposition to Hays. In response, in June 1831, an anti-Jacksonian who signed himself Corn Planter wrote a letter to the newspaper describing Hays as unqualified based on his "intemperate, idle, and wholly disqualifying habits", and protested the political appointments and government-funded salaries of Jackson's kinsmen, including Hays, Chester, Coffee, McLemore, and A. J. Donelson, and asking: "Have we, sir, no high-minded and honorable men amongst us, who are qualified to offices of honor, profit, and trust, but the nephews of President Jackson?" Crockett wrote to the Southern Statesman newspaper of Jackson, Tennessee:

If I am to be condemned for acting honestly, let it be so. I considered myself bound to answer the inquiry, in the language of truth, which I yet contend I did. I regret the necessity I am under of giving publicity to the correspondence between the Committee and myself, but I am informed Col. Hays is cursing and abusing me, and misrepresenting the true state of the case. Self-justification is the first law of nature. I have never done an act that I am unwilling for the people of my District to know.

— Davy Crockett, Southern Statesman, Jackson, Tennessee, June 4, 1831

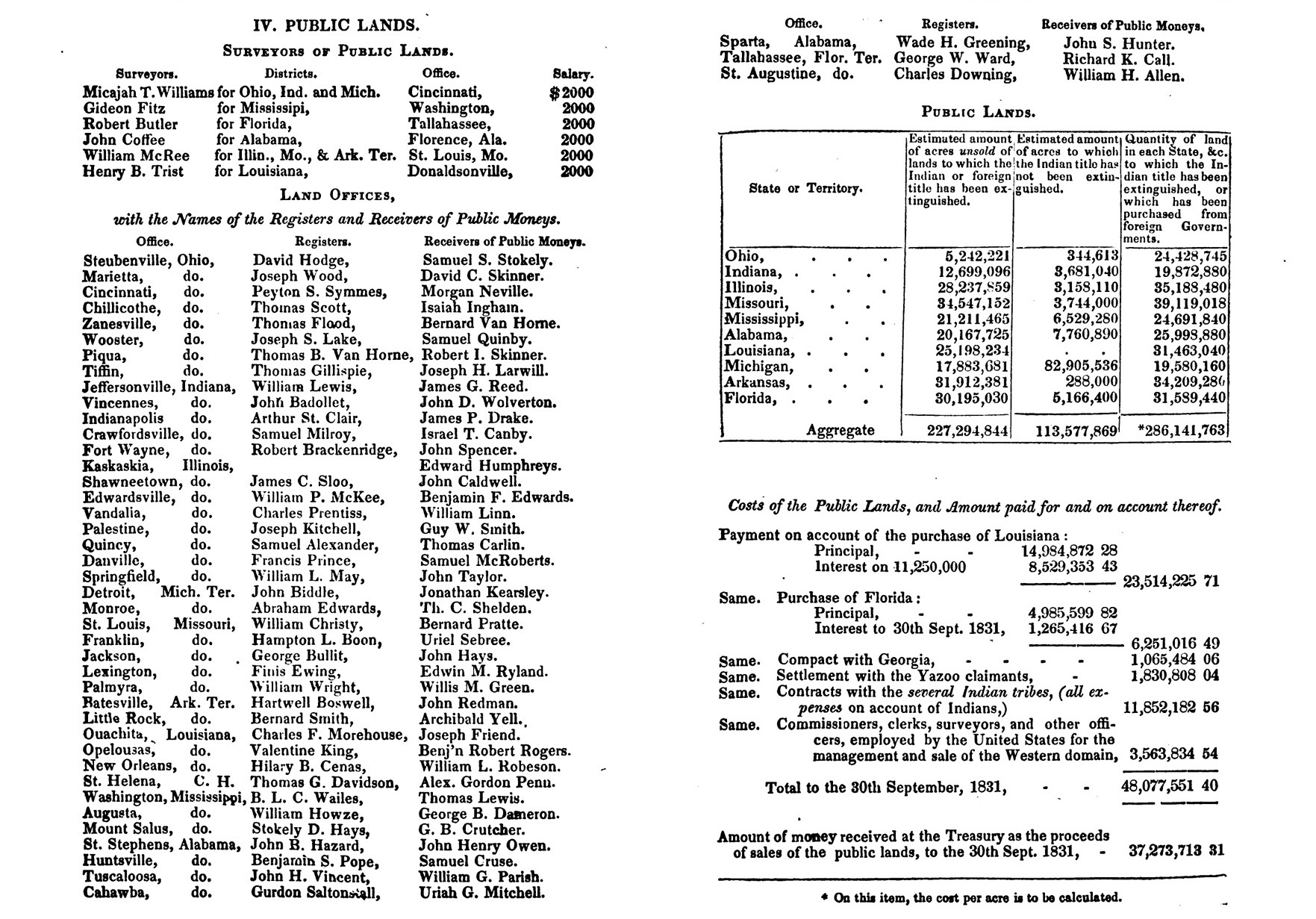
Jackson allies who held appointments to administer the survey and sale of the public lands of the United States in 1832 included Hays, John Coffee, Robert Butler, Richard K. Call, and Archibald Yell (The American Almanac, 1833)

U.S. Senator from Mississippi George Poindexter objected to the Hays appointment on the basis the land to be surveyed was in Mississippi and Hays was a Tennessean. In the first round, the Senate rejected Hays, backed Poindexter's objection, and passed a motion affirming Poindexter's position. Eventually, "a temporary truce was reached on this issue, when Hays was appointed to the lesser office of register" at the Clinton (formerly Mount Salus) land office, about 10 mi (16 km) due west of the state capital, Jackson. (Note: Mount Salus, located along the Natchez Trace, was originally known as Mount Dexter, when it was the site of a "temporary Indian agency". The land office was first opened following the 1820 Treaty of Doak's Stand, "for the purpose of disposing of the Choctaw lands acquired under 'The New Purchase.'") The surveyorship (temporarily, as it turned out) went to Poindexter's candidate, Gideon Fitz, thus "party unity was preserved...patronage was divided to the satisfaction of the contending parties. Only the land business suffered." This incident was the beginning of a deeper rift between Jackson and Poindexter. Hays' appointment to the register job was confirmed on February 21, 1831, but he was dead by the autumn of that year. Jackson sought to replace him at the Clinton office with Samuel Gwin, son of Jackson's wartime chaplain, Rev. James Gwin. Poindexter objected and blocked this nomination as well, and the feud exploded. Crockett broke with Jackson, lost his Congressional seat by a slim margin, and bid Tennessee farewell with the noted valedictory, "You may all go to hell, and I will go to Texas". Crockett was killed at the Alamo by the Mexican Army, in part because he "chose to join Col. William B. Travis, who had deliberately disregarded Sam Houston's orders to withdraw from the Alamo, rather than support Houston, a Jackson sympathizer".

Gwin was appointed to the newly created land office at Chocchuma, Mississippi, near the Yalobusha River, and he died from wounds received in a duel with Poindexter's former law partner, Isaac Caldwell. (Note: Caldwell was killed immediately; Gwin was shot through the lung and died two years later in New Orleans. Gwin's brother William M. Gwin became influential during the Martin Van Buren administration and was eventually elevated to the U.S. Senate by the legislature of the newly admitted state of California. The sale of public land at the Chocchuma land office was investigated by the U.S. Congress and found substantial malfeasance. Further to the point, "after 1832," meaning during the second term of Andrew Jackson's presidency, "Samuel and William M. Gwin, leaders of the state Regency, were the virtual dictators of federal patronage in Mississippi.")

== Death and legacy ==
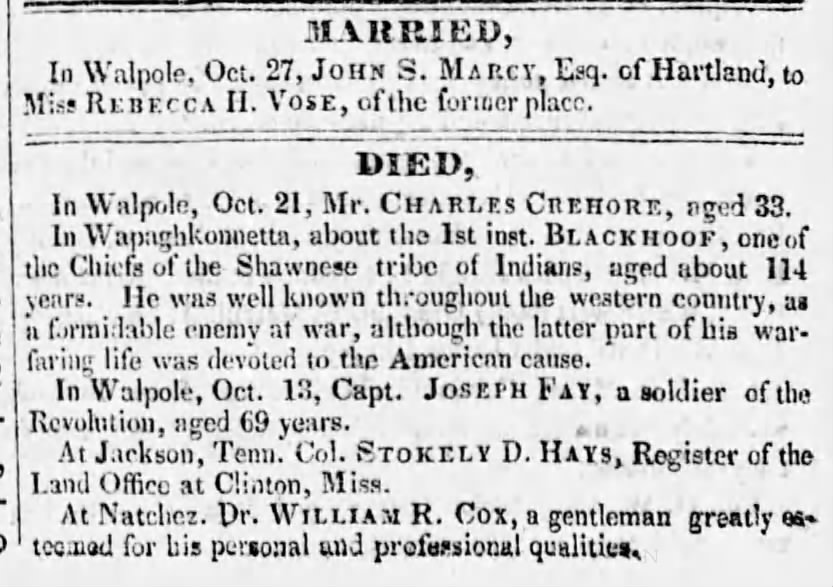
A Vermont newspaper reported on the deaths of Black Hoof of the Shawnee (Šaawanwaki) at Wapakoneta, Ohio, and Stokely D. Hays of the Donelson family at Jackson, Tennessee (Vermont Courier, November 4, 1831)

Stockley D. Hays fell ill and died on September 8, 1831. According to his obituary in the Jackson newspaper Southern Statesman:

Mr. Hays' death of bilious fever has spread an unusual gloom around us—possessed of hospitable, kind, and generous feelings, even to a fault, no man had fewer enemies ... Hays was by profession a lawyer—endued with a strong mind, and possessing advantages of liberal education. Fame and fortune were within his grasp, but such were his social habits that neither ambition or parsimony could find a resting place in his bosom. For the purpose of removing his family, he had just returned in apparently good health from Clinton, Mississippi, where he had been for some time attending his official duties as Register of the Land Office. He has left a widow, two children, and numerous train of relatives. Masonic honors.

Hays' widow, Lydia Butler Hays, died in Shelby County, Tennessee, on November 22, 1865, at age 77. J. G. Cisco wrote of Stockley Hays in a 1903 history of Madison County, Tennessee, describing him as "a lawyer of ability and a genial gentleman. He was said to have been the finest-looking man in Jackson, being over 6 ft 0 in (1.83 m) tall and weighed 200 lb (91 kg) ... Mr. S. D. Hays, a prominent lawyer of Jackson, is a grandson of Colonel Hays." In 1904, Hays' grandson was featured as a notable attorney in an advertorial insert about the commerce and industry of Jackson. In 2017, descendants and researchers placed grave markers at Riverside Cemetery (Jackson, Tennessee) for Hays, his sister Narcissa Hays, and his mother Jane Donelson Hays.

Historian Lorman Ratner described Andrew Jackson as a boy without a father and a man without sons, which may have motivated him to accept guardianship of dozens of young people who lived with him at various times, or whom he both assisted and used for his own benefit. Hays, as a nephew of Andrew Jackson, was one of the several early participants in and beneficiaries of this system. Jackson's marriage to Rachel Donelson came with an "army of brothers" and nephews, and together they engaged in what has been described as vertically integrated family-business imperialism. According to Inman (2017): "They fought the native peoples, negotiated the treaties to end the fighting and demanded native lands as the price of war, surveyed the newly available lands, bought those lands, litigated over disputed boundaries, adjudicated the cases, and made and kept laws within the region that had been carved out of Indian lands".

== See also ==
- James C. Bronaugh, assistant surgeon general for the Division of the South
- Andrew Jackson Jr., a nephew turned son
- John Hutchings, another notable nephew
- Andrew Jackson's plantations in northern Alabama
- Andrew Jackson and land speculation in the United States
- Andrew Jackson and the slave trade in the United States
- Bibliography of Andrew Jackson
- Bibliography of the Burr conspiracy
- Bibliography of Davy Crockett
- Robards–Donelson–Jackson relationship controversy § Jackson's marriage in politics: 1828 election and beyond

== Sources ==
- Abernethy, Thomas P. (February 1949). "Aaron Burr in Mississippi". The Journal of Southern History. 15 (1): 9–21. doi:10.2307/2198070. ISSN 0022-4642. JSTOR 2198070.
- ——— (1954). The Burr Conspiracy. New York: Oxford University Press. LCCN 54006907. OCLC 710644.
- Army JAG Corps (1975). The Army Lawyer: A History of the Judge Advocate General's Corps, 1775–1975. Washington, D.C.: U.S. Government Printing Office. 008-020-00563-1.
- Boylston, James R.; Wiener, Allen J. (2009). David Crockett in Congress: The Rise and Fall of the Poor Man's Friend. Houston, Texas: Bright Sky Press. ISBN 978-1-933979-51-9. LCCN 2009024431. OCLC 318426723.
- Bradley, James W., ed. (2002). Interim Appointment: W.C.C. Claiborne Letter Book, 1804–1805. The Louisiana Purchase Collection. LSU Press. ISBN 978-0-8071-2684-4. LCCN 2001004234. OCLC 47746051.
- Carey, Bill (2018). Runaways, Coffles and Fancy Girls: A History of Slavery in Tennessee. Nashville, Tennessee: Clearbrook Press. ISBN 978-0-9725680-4-3. LCCN 2018903570. OCLC 1045068878.
- Cheathem, Mark R. (2007). Old Hickory's Nephew: The Political and Private Struggles of Andrew Jackson Donelson. Southern Biography Series. Baton Rouge: Louisiana State University Press. ISBN 978-0-8071-3238-8. LCCN 2006024951. OCLC 560597030. Project MUSE book 16672.
- ——— (2014). Andrew Jackson, Southerner. Baton Rouge, Louisiana: Louisiana State University Press. ISBN 978-0-8071-5099-3. LCCN 2012049695. OCLC 858995561. Project MUSE book 26506.
- Cisco, J. G. (January 1903). "Madison County (Part 2 of 2)". The American Historical Magazine and Tennessee Historical Society Quarterly. 8 (1): 26–48. ISSN 2333-8997. JSTOR 45331988.
- Claiborne, J. F. H. (1880). Mississippi, as a province, territory and state, with biographical notices of eminent citizens. Jackson, Mississippi: Power & Barksdale. LCCN rc01002482. OCLC 68181845. OL 7795030W.
- Clayton, W. Woodford (1880). History of Davidson County, Tennessee. Philadelphia: J. W. Lewis & Company. hdl:loc.gdc/scd0001.00017250371. LCCN rc01001297. OCLC 181343718. OL 15383277W – via HathiTrust.
- Coffee, John (1901). "Letters from Gen. Coffee". The American Historical Magazine. 6 (2): 174–190. ISSN 2333-8970. JSTOR 42657529.
- Drew, Bettina Lee (December 2001). Master Andrew Jackson: Indian Removal and the Culture of Slavery (Thesis). Yale University. UMI 3030759. ProQuest 3030759.
- Dunn, W. McKee (1876). A Sketch of the History and Duties of the Judge-advocate General's Department, United States Army. Washington, D.C.: McGill & Witherow – via Harvard University Libraries, HathiTrust.
- Everett, Grace (February 1944). "The Hays Family". The Jackson Sun. Madison County Historical Society. Jackson, Tennessee.
  - Chapter I: John Donelson and the Adventure - February 13, 1944
  - Chapter II: Rachel Donelson and Andrew Jackson, Jane Donelson Hays - February 14, 1944
  - Chapter III: Stockley Donelson Hays, Andrew Jackson, and the Burr conspiracy - February 15, 1944
  - Chapter IV: Stockley Donelson Hays, Natchez Expedition, Nashville Inn fight with the Benton brothers - February 16, 1944.
  - Chapter V: Stockley Donelson Hays, settlement of Madison County, later life and death of Jane Donelson Hays - February 17, 1944
  - Chapter VI: Samuel Jackson Hays - February 18, 1944
  - Chapter VII: Samuel Jackson Hays, Middleton Hays, Richard Jackson Hays - February 20, 1944
  - Chapter VIII: Richard Jackson Hays, conclusion and source listing - February 21, 1944
- Finger, John R. (2001). Tennessee Frontiers: Three Regions in Transition. A History of the Trans-Appalachian Frontier. Bloomington: Indiana University Press. ISBN 978-0-253-10872-2. LCCN 2001001387. OCLC 50174763.
- Fratcher, William F. (April 1959). "History of the Judge Advocate General's Corps". Military Law Review. Washington, D.C.: Department of the Army: 89–122. No. 27-100-4 – via HathiTrust.
- Gates, Paul W. (November 1968). History of Public Land Law Development. U.S. States Public Land Law Review Commission. Washington, D.C.: U.S. Government Printing Office. LCCN 68062999. OCLC 453829.
- Inman, Natalie R. (2017). Brothers and Friends: Kinship in Early America. Early American Spaces. Athens, Georgia: University of Georgia Press. doi:10.1353/book51901. ISBN 978-0-8203-5110-0. LCCN 2016055415. OCLC 985105661.
- Kanon, Tom (2014). Tennesseans at War, 1812–1815: Andrew Jackson, the Creek War, and the Battle of New Orleans. Tuscaloosa: University of Alabama Press. ISBN 9780817318291. LCCN 2013049815. OCLC 900093586. Project MUSE book 30812.
- Meredith, Rachel (May 2013). "There Was Somebody Always Dying and Leaving Jackson as Guardian": The Wards of Andrew Jackson (M.A. History). Murfreesboro, Tennessee: Middle Tennessee State University. ProQuest 1538368.
- Miles, Edwin A. (February 1958). "Andrew Jackson and Senator George Poindexter". The Journal of Southern History. 24 (1): 51–66. doi:10.2307/2955285. ISSN 0022-4642. JSTOR 2955285.
- ——— (1970) [1960]. Jacksonian Democracy in Mississippi. The American Scene: Comments and Commentators. New York City: Da Capo Press. LCCN 78107415. SBN 306-71884-7.
- Mueller, Ken (2014). Senator Benton and the People: Master Race Democracy on the Early American Frontier. Early American Places. Ithaca, New York: Cornell University Press. ISBN 9781501757556. LCCN 2013041733. OCLC 1203952026. Project MUSE book 83601.
- Owsley, Harriet Chappell (Winter 1977). "The Marriages of Rachel Donelson". Tennessee Historical Quarterly. 36 (4): 479–492. ISSN 0040-3261. JSTOR 42625784.
- Robinson, Dan M. (Fall 1967). "Robert Hays, Unsung Pioneer of the Cumberland Country". Tennessee Historical Quarterly. 26 (3): 263–278. ISSN 0040-3261. JSTOR 42622953.
- Rohrbough, Malcolm J. (1971) [1968]. The Land Office Business: The Settlement and Administration of American Public Lands, 1789–1837. Galaxy Book 354 (Paperback ed.). London: Oxford University Press. ISBN 978-0-19-501472-3. LCCN 68029725. OCLC 176589.
- Shockley, Megan Taylor (Fall 1997). "King of the Wild Frontier vs. King Andrew I: Davy Crockett and the Election of 1831". Tennessee Historical Quarterly. 56 (3): 158–169. ISSN 0040-3261. JSTOR 42627359.
- Smith, Elbert B. (February 1958). "'Now Defend Yourself, You Damned Rascal!'". American Heritage. Vol. IX, no. 2. pp. 44–48. ISSN 0002-8738. OCLC 1479963.
- U.S. Congress (1852). "Appendix to Senate Debates: Trial of Aaron Burr". The Debates and Proceedings in the Congress of the United States, Tenth Congress, First Session (October 26, 1807 to April 25, 1808). Annals of the Congress of the United States. Vol. I. Washington, D.C.: Gales and Seaton. Digital page images 190–386, columns 385–778 – via University of North Texas Libraries.
- Various; Jackson, Andrew (1980). Smith, Sam B.; Owsley, Harriet Chappell; Moser, Harold D. (eds.). The Papers of Andrew Jackson, Volume I, 1770–1803. Knoxville: University of Tennessee Press. doi:10.7290/utp7943. ISBN 978-0-8704-9219-8. LCCN 79015078. OCLC 5029597.
- ———; ——— (1984). Moser, Harold D.; MacPherson, Sharon (eds.). The Papers of Andrew Jackson, Volume II, 1804–1813. Knoxville: University of Tennessee Press. doi:10.7290/utp3038. ISBN 978-0-8704-9441-3.
- ———; ——— (2010). Feller, Daniel; Coens, Thomas; Moss, Laura-Eve (eds.). The Papers of Andrew Jackson, Volume VIII, 1830. University of Tennessee Press. doi:10.7290/utp6455. ISBN 978-1-57233-715-2.
- ———; ——— (2013). ———; ———; ———; Alexander, Erik B. (eds.). The Papers of Andrew Jackson, Volume IX, 1831. University of Tennessee Press. doi:10.7290/utp9109. ISBN 978-1-62190-004-7.
- Watson, Samuel J. (2012). Jackson's Sword: The Army Officer Corps on the American Frontier, 1810–1821. Modern War Studies. Lawrence: University Press of Kansas. ISBN 978-0-7006-1884-2. LCCN 2012027879. OCLC 788282695.
- White, C. Albert (1983). A History of the Rectangular Survey System (PDF). Washington, D.C.: U.S. Dept. of the Interior, Bureau of Land Management. LCCN 82004510. OCLC 8430622. OL 5898716W. Supt. of Docs. No. I53.2:Su7/2.
- Wilkinson, James (1935). Wilkinson, Soldier and Pioneer. New Orleans: Rogers Printing Co. LCCN 44002879. OCLC 1855454.
- Williams, Emma Inman (1946). Historic Madison: The Story of Jackson and Madison County, Tennessee, from the Prehistoric Moundbuilders to 1917. Jackson, Tennessee: Madison County Historical Society. LCCN 47004107. OCLC 4045339 – via University of Virginia Libraries, HathiTrust.
