= Eli Hammond =

American militia officer (1764–1842)

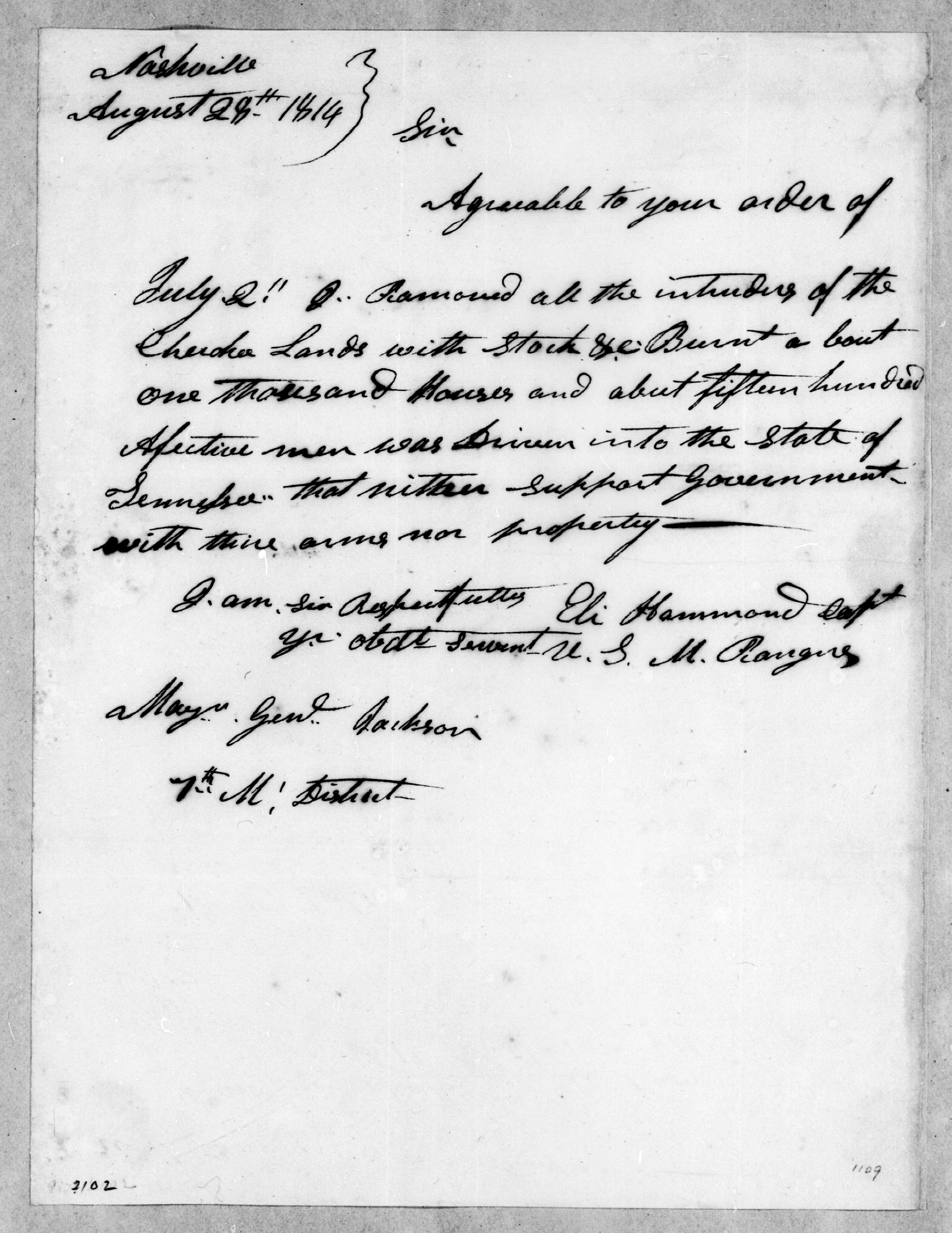
- "Sir, Agreeable to your order of July 2. I Ramoved all the intruders of the Cherokee Lands with Stock etc. Burnt about one thousand Houses and abut fifteen hundred Afective men was Driven into the State of Tennessee that nither Support Government with thire arms nor property." (Eli Hammond to Andrew Jackson, August 28, 1814, via Library of Congress)
- Born: March 16, 1764; North Carolina
- Died: January 26, 1842 (aged 77); Madison County, Alabama
- Known for: "Indian fighter" in wars against the Chickamauga Cherokee and Redstick Creeks; association with Andrew Jackson

Eli Hammond (March 16, 1764–January 26, 1842) was an early settler of Tennessee and Alabama in the United States known today for his association with 7th U.S. President Andrew Jackson. He fought the Chickamauga Cherokee in the 1790s and served as an officer with Jackson's Tennessee militia in the Creek War. John Spencer Bassett described him as "a very efficient soldier under Jackson in 1813." He also fought on Jackson's side in a famous Nashville tavern brawl. Around 1817, he moved to Madison County, Alabama Territory, where he raised a large family, and became a plantation owner outside of Huntsville.

== Life and career ==
Hammond was a North Carolinian who had moved west to Davidson County, Tennessee. He was involved in an attack on a Cherokee (Tsalagi, ᏣᎳᎩ) village in 1793 when "he was one of a small group of volunteers to form a retaliating group against the Indians in Tennessee. Led by a man the natives called the Fool Warrior, Abraham Castleman, the six men dressed like Indians and crossed into prohibited territory near Will's Town. They attacked the surprised Indians, killing several, and making good their own escape, untouched." Another account describes him as "the Indian fighter" and associates him with the 1794 Nickajack Expedition.

He was said to have "lived in the family of Gen. Jackson some years." In 1799, his name was promoted by John Sevier "at Andrew Jackson's suggestion" as a worthy recipient of upcoming possible political appointments. In April 1813 he owned a horse that had been sired by Andrew Jackson's Truxton. In July 1813 Hammond wrote to Tennessee governor Willie Blount urging military action against the Red Sticks, stating that "whites were being murdered, corn and cattle were being destroyed, and hundreds of 'friendly' Creeks [Muscogee, Mvskoke] were fleeing to the Cherokees for protection." At age 49 he was party to the Jackson–Benton brawl of 1813 in September: "Captain Eli Hammond and Stokley Hays went after Jesse, who tried to stave off his attackers with his bare hands while Hays tried to stab him and Hammond beat him on the head. Jesse managed to get his pistol out to shoot Hays but the gun misfired."

He served in the Creek War subconflict of the War of 1812, having "formed his own company of Mounted Rangers from Huntsville. They joined Andrew Jackson as the General's army passed through town on the way to the battle of Horseshoe Bend. He became Lt. Colonel Hammond by the time of the assault on Pensacola in 1814." He was key to the American action at the Battle of Tallusahatchee on November 3, 1813, under command of John Coffee, as "Captain Eli Hammond's company of rangers, in front of [Col. John Alcorn's cavalry regiment], made a charge at the village to draw the Creeks out from cover and then quickly retreated while Alcorn's men continued to march around the village until they linked with the left wing. The village now being completely surrounded, the men dismounted and charged the trapped Creeks, who 'fought as desperately as ever men did upon earth,' according to one witness."

There is a conflict dating to at least 1827 over whether Hammond or a man named William Martin, a Tennessee militia officer and later a Tennessee state legislator, played a key role in the Battle of Talladega on November 9, 1813. According to regional historian Brian Laster:

Captain William Martin would have seen action at Talladega under the command of Colonel Newton Cannon positioned on the left wing of the cavalry. It is possible, according to family tradition, that on the day of the battle, he was part of the reserve cavalry under Colonel Robert Henry Dyer. One of the reasons given for the animosity between Cannon and Jackson is attributed to an incident that occurred at Talladega. Cannon believed Jackson deliberately left him out of the official report. In a letter written in 1827, Archelaus Hughes lends credence to this theory by saying, 'His [Martin's] company was in front of the main army in the Battle of Talladega. It was his company, and not Capt. Hammond that fought up the dry branch at Talladega, as stated in the official report of Gen. Jackson.' Hughes had lived with Martin for a short period while in Williamson County and it is likely he heard this version of the story from Martin. Andrew Jackson, in a letter to his wife Rachel, offers the following report of the battle, '...I had formed a complete circle around them, the creeks were about a 1,000 strong and when they approached the militia line, it in part gave way, this occasioned me to dismount my reserve commanded by Colo. Dyer composed of Smith's, Tyrell's, Hammond's, Edward's and Molton's companies who met them like Bull dogs, and at two fires repulsed them killing 27 on the spot—had I had these men still on horseback in pursuit, not one of the 1000 would have escaped.' According to Hughes, Martin's name should have been listed in place of Hammond's.

Jackson was irritated with Hammond in February 1814, as Hammond and his horse-mounted fighters had gone home. Jackson wrote a letter accusing Hammond of abandoning his duty, reminding him of the chain of command, and ordering him to muster his troops back to Madison County, Mississippi Territory, leave them in command of Lt. Abram Maury, (Note: Apparently this is neither Abram Maury Jr. nor Abram P. Maury but a distinct Maury who lived in Franklin, Tennessee and died in 1815.) and report to Jackson at Fort Strother. On February 17, Jackson wrote to John Coffee, "Capt Hammonds has been with me and I presume regrets his attachment to those vipers, who has been attempting to destroy his benefactors—I expect he will attend to his duty better, or I will arrest him[.]" There was also an ongoing conflict regarding custody of pack horses. In Coffee's letter of April 1, 1814, reporting to Jackson on the Battle of Horseshoe Bend (Tohopeka), he wrote that, "Captain Hammonds company of Raingers took post on the river bank on my right and during the whole engagement kept up a continued and destruc tive fire on those of the enemy that attempted to escape into the River and killed a very large proportion of those that were found dead under the bank above as well as many others sunk under water[.]" In August 1814, Hammond reported to Jackson about "removal of intruders from Cherokee lands."

According to his obituary Hammond officially relocated to Alabama Territory in 1817. In 1820 a forger in Huntsville, Alabama, signed Hammond's name, among others, to get "his note," valued at $6,000, "discounted." Hammond was politically a Democrat and supported the candidacy of James K. Polk in 1839.

== Death and legacy ==
He died at age 77 in 1842, and is buried in the Hammond-Bouldin Cemetery in Madison County in northern Alabama. His wife was Mary Owen, and they had nine children together, including "Benjamin [who] became a physician and married in succession three daughters of Capt. William and Susan Routt...When Eli (Senior) died, Ferdinand became Executor of his estate—800 acres in the northwestern part of [Madison] county. In 1844 Ferdinand as executor sold the land to his brother Arthur for $1. The next year, Arthur sold 361 acres of the land back to Ferdinand for $100. Ferdinand also obtained a government land patent signed by his father's friend, President Andrew Jackson in 1835."

== Sources ==
- DeWitt, John H. (December 1916). "Letters of General John Coffee to His Wife, 1813–1815". Tennessee Historical Magazine. 2 (4): 264–295. ISSN 2333-9012. JSTOR 44698718.
- Kanon, Tom (2014). Tennesseans at War, 1812–1815: Andrew Jackson, the Creek War, and the Battle of New Orleans. Tuscaloosa: University of Alabama Press. ISBN 9780817318291. LCCN 2013049815. OCLC 900093586. Project MUSE book 30812.
- Laster, Brian (2008). "Life and Times of William Martin" (PDF). Williamson County Historical Journal. 49 II. Franklin, Tennessee: 14–42.
- Rohr, Nancy (Summer–Fall 1999). "The News from Huntsville, 1820". The Huntsville Historical Review. 26 (1) 1: 3–23. ISSN 1048-3152. OCLC 7993191 – via University of Alabama in Huntsville Digital Commons.
- Jackson, Andrew (1991). Moser, Harold; Hoth, David; Macpherson, Sharon; Reinbold, John (eds.). The Papers of Andrew Jackson, Volume III, 1814–1815. University of Tennessee Press. doi:10.7290/utp9085. ISBN 978-0-87049-650-9.
