= 1813 Jackson–Benton brawl =

American gun and knife fight

Jackson–Benton brawl of 1813
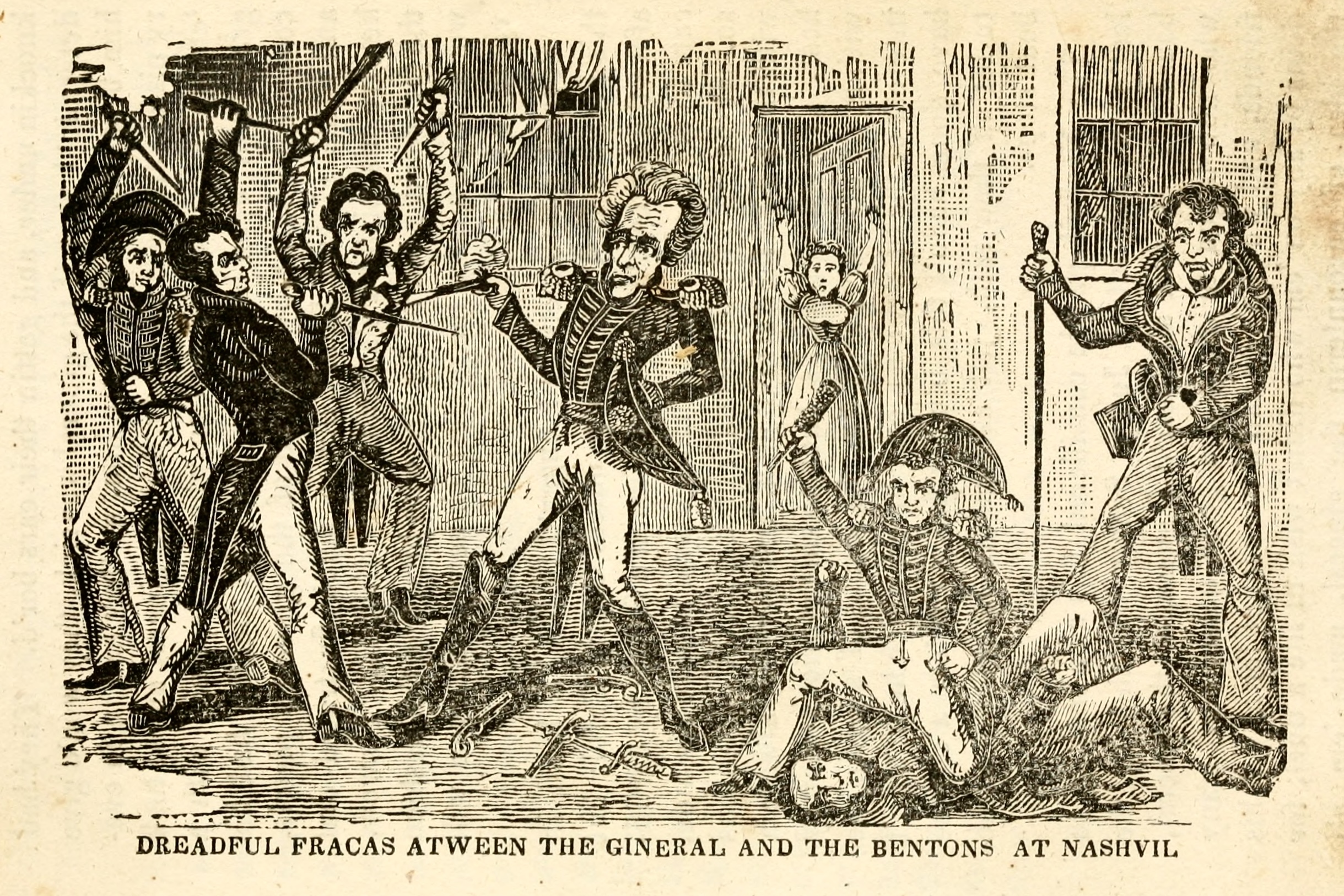
- "Dreadful Fracas Atween the Gineral and the Bentons at Nashvil", from The life of Andrew Jackson by Major Jack Downing (1834), a parodic biography attributed to Seba Smith
- Date: September 4, 1813
- Location: Talbot's Hotel, Nashville, Tennessee, United States
- Participants: Andrew Jackson; Thomas Hart Benton; John Coffee; Stockley D. Hays; Jesse Benton Jr.; Eli Hammond

A gun fight and knife fight between several historically significant figures of the frontier-era U.S. South took place on September 4, 1813, at a tavern on the public square in Nashville, Tennessee. Future U.S. president Andrew Jackson and three of his Donelson kinsmen (John Coffee, Stockley D. Hays, and Sandy Donelson), fought future U.S. Senator Thomas Hart Benton and his brother Jesse Benton Jr. Horsewhipping was threatened. The parties variously stabbed, shot, and beat each another. Jesse Benton shot Jackson, leaving him with a serious shoulder injury. Jackson and T. H. Benton had previously been close, but were estranged as a result of the fight. They eventually reconciled, with Tom Benton acting as a crucial and insistent voice in defense of Jackson and Jacksonian policies in the U.S. Senate throughout the second quarter of the 19th century.

== Prologue ==
To begin, Nashville merchant Jesse Benton Jr. had gotten involved in a duel with future Tennessee governor William Carroll that was, reportedly, several steps away from the original insult. Carroll slapped an officer who had insulted him in some way at a ball; according to historian Elbert B. Smith this was Littleton Johnson. Johnson sent Carroll a duel challenge that was carried by a man named Pilcher; Carroll kicked Pilcher down the stairs for insulting him by bringing him the challenge from Johnson. Pilcher then challenged Carroll to a duel for kicking him down the stairs, which message he sent by medical doctor Boyd McNairy (brother to federal judge John McNairy, and slave trader and planter Nathaniel McNairy). When Boyd McNairy delivered the message to Carroll, the latter refused to duel Pilcher on the grounds that he was not enough of a gentleman to participate in a duel, and when McNairy offered to duel Carroll in Pilcher's place, Carroll said McNairy had been disqualified from dueling "because you were second in a duel and you made your man fire before the word was given". McNairy delivered the above information back to Pilcher, who then sent Jesse Benton as his messenger. Benton consulted with Andrew Jackson, who said that Carroll might as well duel Benton as anyone since it seemed like an inevitability anyway.

Carroll and Benton dueled at a place called Sandy Bottom on June 14, 1813. Jackson served as Carroll's second; John M. Armstrong served as Benton's second. Carroll was hit in the thumb, and Benton took what Benton biographer Ken Mueller characterized as a "long, raking" gunshot wound to the buttocks, which was painful, embarrassing, and likely contributed to long-term health problems. According to a 1925 profile of Carroll, Jesse Benton's butt injury "was a source of much merriment and joke in Nashville".

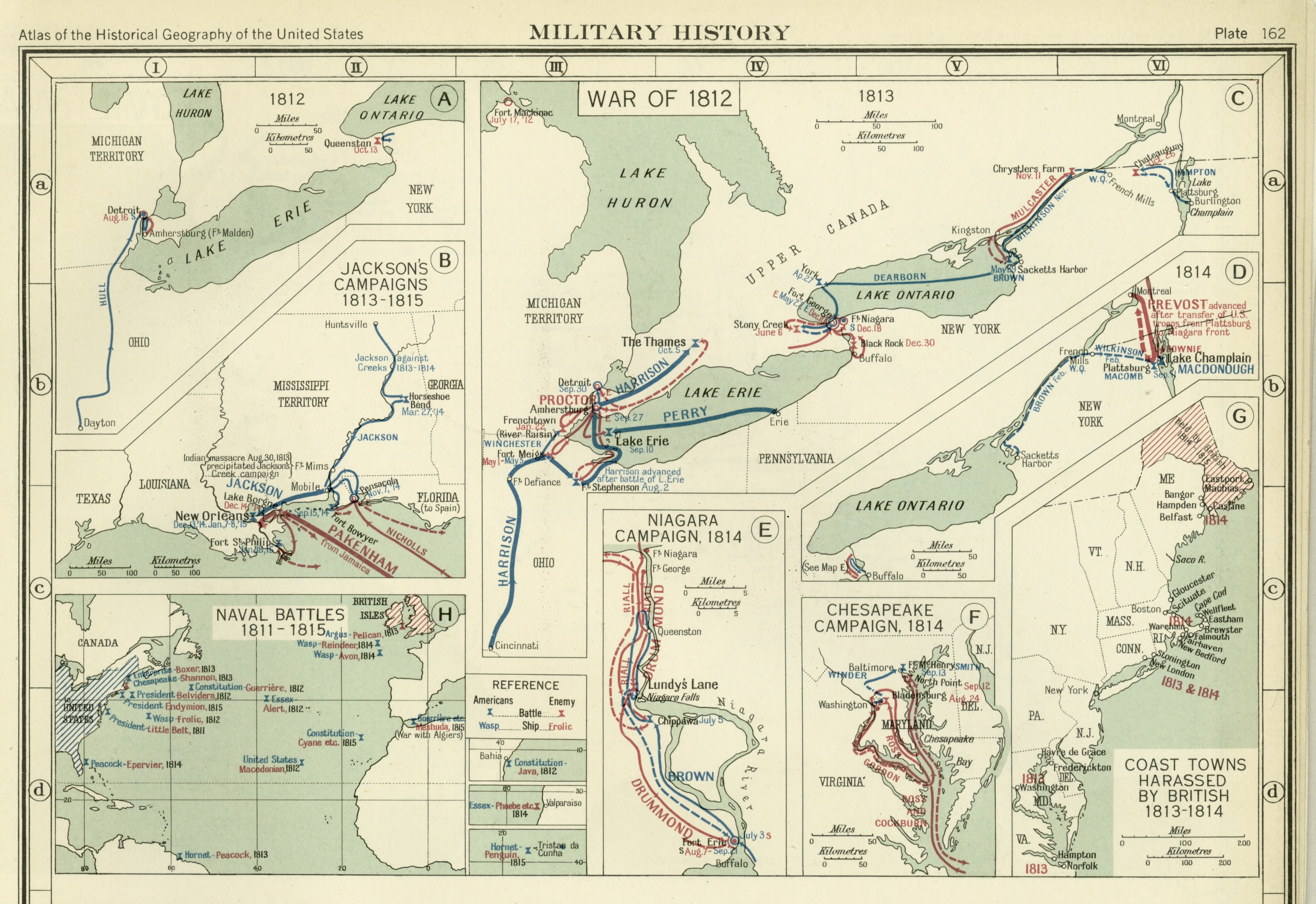
War of 1812 campaign maps, including Jackson's campaigns 1813–1815 (Charles O. Paullin, 1932)

While this was going on, future U.S. Senator from Missouri Thomas Hart Benton was in the capital city of the United States, Washington, D.C., trying to get assigned to a more active theater of the ongoing War of 1812, and lobbying on behalf of Jackson. Earlier in the year, Jackson had launched, by riverine flotilla, the fruitless Natchez expedition of Tennessee militiamen called up by governor Willie Blount, intending to assist the U.S. regular army in the lower Mississippi River valley, but without any specific order from the U.S. Department of War or budget appropriation from the United States Congress. He was rebuffed and stalled by general James Wilkinson, and in February 1813, the "corps under your command" was "dismissed from public service", per message of Secretary of War John Armstrong. Jackson was ordered to surrender any "public property" to Wilkinson, but Jackson "flatly refused" to transfer his men to Wilkinson's command and determined to "lead them home on his own responsibility." To "lead them home on his own responsibility," he had borrowed US$1,000 (equivalent to $16,681 in 2025) from merchant banker James Jackson to buy beef, cornmeal, and flour for the troops on the Natchez Trace home to Nashville, and to rent wagons with draymen to haul the sick. In the conclusion of one recent researcher, "Few men would remember Washington or James Jackson's names ... [but] had the Tennessee bankers refused the General's request, large numbers of Tennessee Volunteers would have suffered, and many more would have died." Thus, to recoup the $1,000 he needed to repay James and Washington Jackson, Andrew Jackson sent Benton to petition the U.S. government for reimbursement.

== Fighting words and fight ==
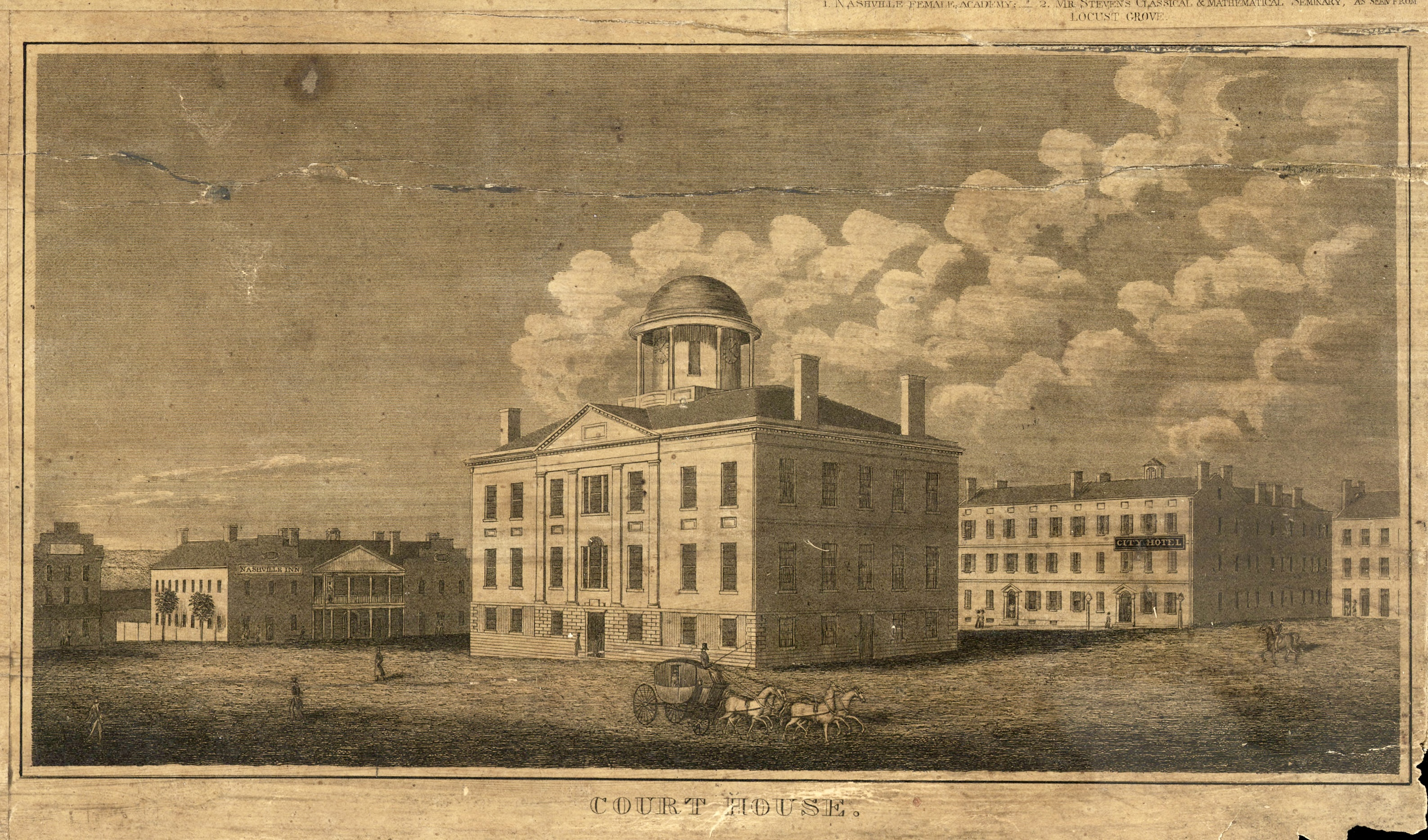
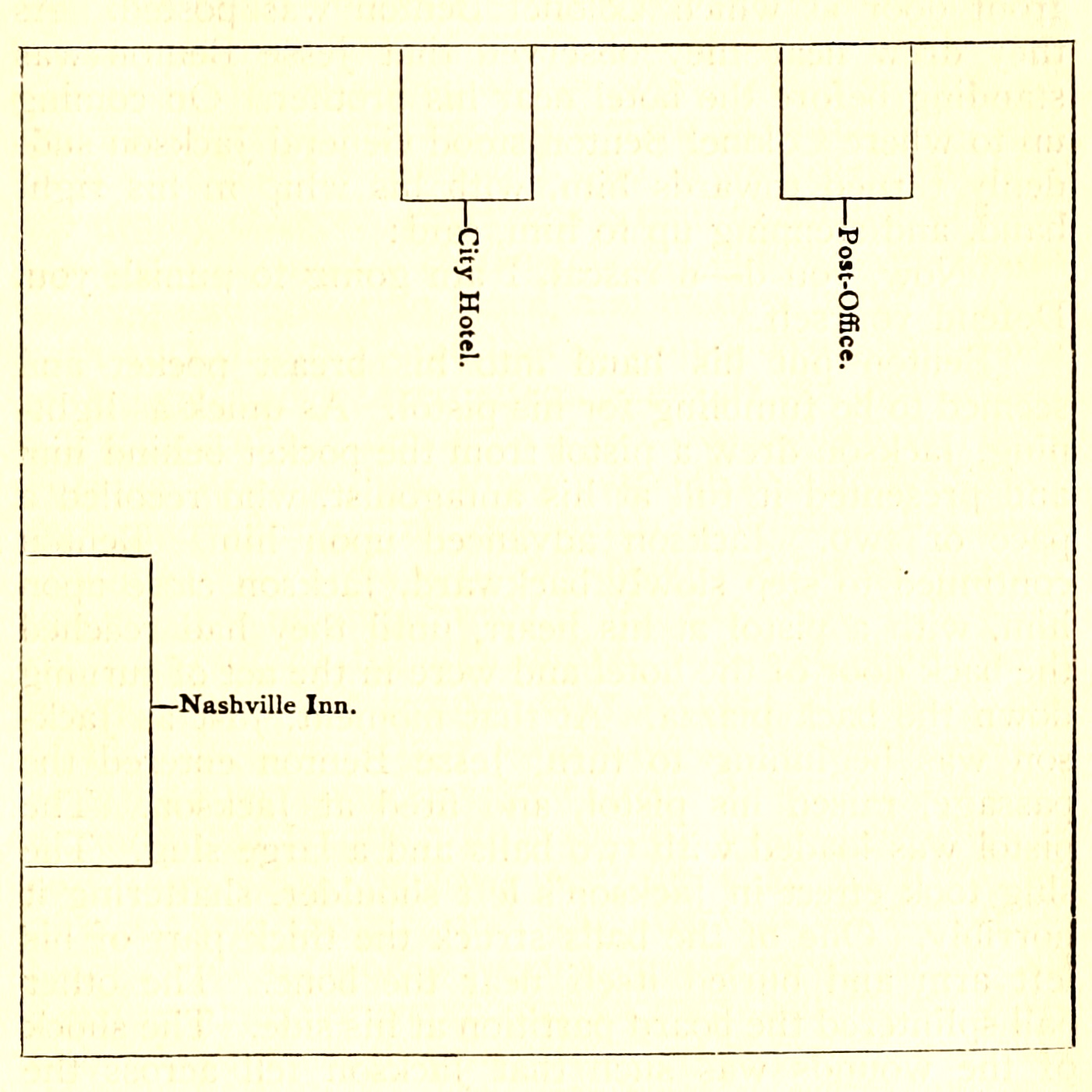
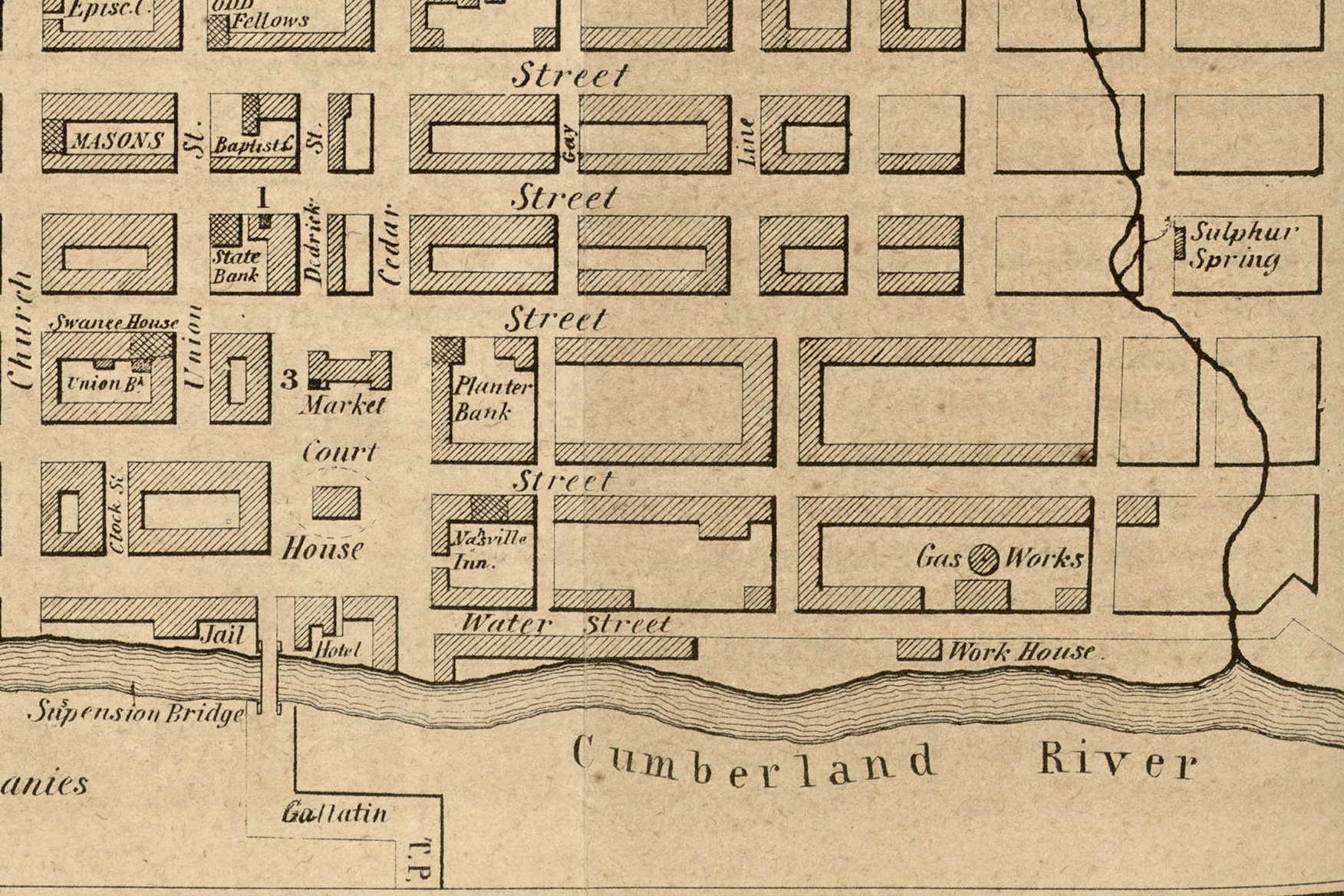
As they appeared in 1831, Nashville Inn, Davidson County Courthouse, and the City Hotel; diagram of Nashville's courthouse square from the "Duels and Quarrels" chapter of C. T. Brady's The True Andrew Jackson (1906); detail of 1854 Nashville map, showing the town's early hotels and location of the courthouse square on the Cumberland River

When T. H. Benton got back to Nashville from Washington, and discovered that Jackson had aided someone who shot his brother, while he had been endeavoring on Jackson's behalf, a sequel conflict erupted. He wrote Jackson that he thought the Carroll–Benton duel had been conducted in a "savage, unequal, unfair, and base manner." In the words of historian and Jackson biographer Robert V. Remini, "Now a fierce guardian of his fame and image, Jackson had become extremely sensitive to public criticism. The trouble with Benton, Jackson said, was his inability to keep his mouth shut."

The Fort Mims massacre took place in the lower Alabama section of Mississippi Territory on August 30, 1813. (This event would begin the Red Sticks War in earnest, and ultimately result in Jackson imposing the crushing Treaty of Fort Jackson on the Mvskokvlke, or Creek Confederacy.) Five days later, on September 4, 1813, Jesse Benton shot Andrew Jackson, and per Mark Cheathem, Jackson biographer and editor of the presidential papers of Martin Van Buren, Jackson's nephew Stockley D. Hays "nearly killed" Jesse Benton. It was a Saturday when the Benton brothers fought Jackson, Hays, Alexander "Sandy" Donelson (another nephew), and John Coffee (an in-law, Jackson's long-time business partner, and, shortly, American general commanding troops in several critical engagements of the Creek War), at Talbot's Hotel (later the City Hotel) in Nashville. The Nashville Inn (earlier Talbot's Tavern) had been founded around the turn of the century by William Terrell Lewis and was always patronized by Jackson, Lewis' business associate and friend of long acquaintance, so Jackson opponents (such as the latter-day Whigs) usually stayed elsewhere, across the public square. On a visit to central Nashville the Bentons had deliberately stayed elsewhere than the Nashville Inn to avoid encountering Jackson, but in the words of Benton biographer and historian E. Smith, "Jackson unhesitatingly assumed the role of aggressor by following Jesse into the hotel", horsewhip in hand, since he had promised to horsewhip Thomas Hart Benton for the perceived insult.

Remini recounted that Jackson and Coffee approached the tavern where they knew the Bentons were staying, and, "Both Bentons were waiting, their pistols loaded with two shots each. As Jackson came abreast of Thomas he suddenly turned toward him, brandished his whip, and cried, 'Now, you damned rascal, I am going to punish you. Defend yourself.'" Jesse Benton got the better of Jackson, slipping around the back and shooting him in the arm while Jackson had held a gun to his brother's head, leaving Jackson with his left arm and a shoulder shredded. Jackson biographer Sean Wilentz says of the brawl and Jackson's injuries that, "The fracas left Jackson with a serious pistol wound in the shoulder, from which he nearly died."

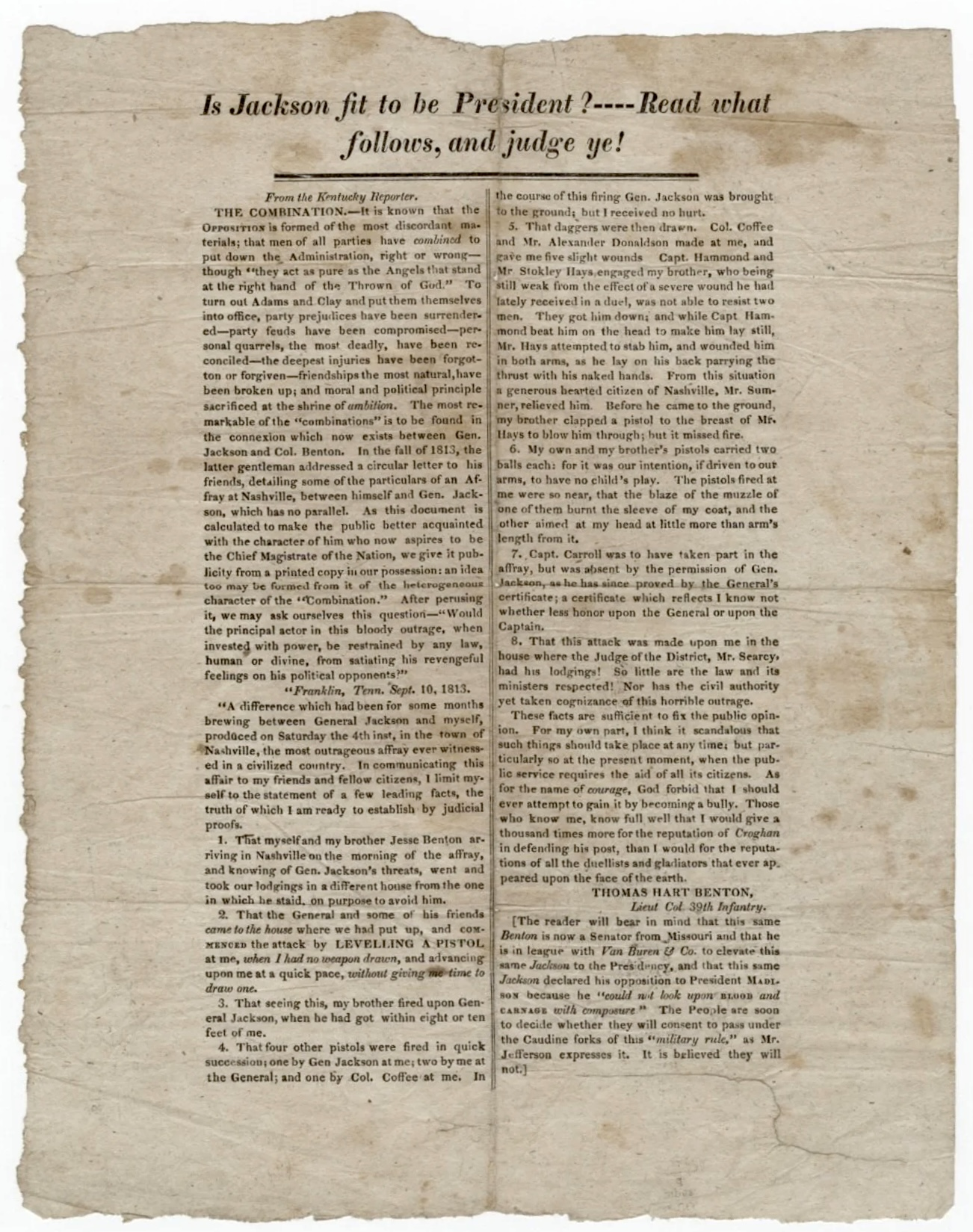
This 1828 anti-Jackson handbill reprinted the text of Thomas Hart Benton's 1813 post-brawl statement

According to the footnotes of Tom Kanon's history of Tennessee military participation in the War of 1812: "Four other pistols were fired in quick succession—one by Jackson at Benton, two by Benton at Jackson, and one by John Coffee at Thomas Benton—but Jackson was the only one hit. Then daggers were drawn." Coffee and Donelson jumped in and stabbed future Senator Benton five times. Hays stabbed Jesse Benton with a knife concealed within a cane, while Eli Hammond beat J. Benton about the head, but "a large and strong button which broke Hays' blade saved Jesse from being perforated. Jesse placed the muzzle of his remaining pistol against Hays' chest and pulled the trigger, but in a fair exchange of mishaps, the charge failed to explode." James Sumner intervened on behalf of the Bentons, helping them driving off Hays and Donelson. Jackson's urgent need for medical attention ended the fight, and per Smith, T. H. Benton "sealed the victory by breaking Jackson's sword across his knee in the public square". Benton later pamphleteered about the brawl, explaining his side of the story.

== Aftermath ==
=== Andrew Jackson ===
Every physician in Nashville treated Jackson's injuries, at either the Nashville Inn, or at Dr. McNairy's house. Caroline McNairy, McNairy's daughter, later claimed the scene was a "sad spectacle ... He lay in the large parlour and by the help of ropes suspended from the ceiling, he was lifted and enabled to rest by change of position." (Dr. McNairy eventually became a dedicated proponent of the anti-Jacksonian Whig Party in Tennessee.) The bleeding reportedly soaked through two mattresses. Attending doctors recommended amputation. According to his first major biographer, James Parton, Jackson told the assembled physicians, "I'll keep my arm." Benton's bullet, which "lay against the bone of the left arm", remained in Jackson's body until 1832, when it was removed by U.S. Navy surgeon Thomas Harris.

Benton's bullet and Charles Dickinson's bullet, lodged in Jackson's left lung since their 1806 duel, may have contributed to "significantly elevated" levels of lead in two samples of Jackson's hair, which were tested in the 1990s by four researchers curious about whether the bullets and the 19th-century treatment regimens for Jackson's various chronic ailments might have resulted in a lead-poisoned U.S. president. The bullet was said to be "flattened by contusion on bone and hackled on the edge". The researchers reported that since Benton's bullet "shattered" Jackson's left shoulder, "contact with synovial fluid in joint space is highly likely", which would increase the exposure to lead subsequent to a projectile injury, and "bony sequestrum, implying osteomyelitis, was sloughed from this wound in 1814 and presented as a memento to Jackson's wife". Jackson reported "improved health" following the 1832 operation by Harris.

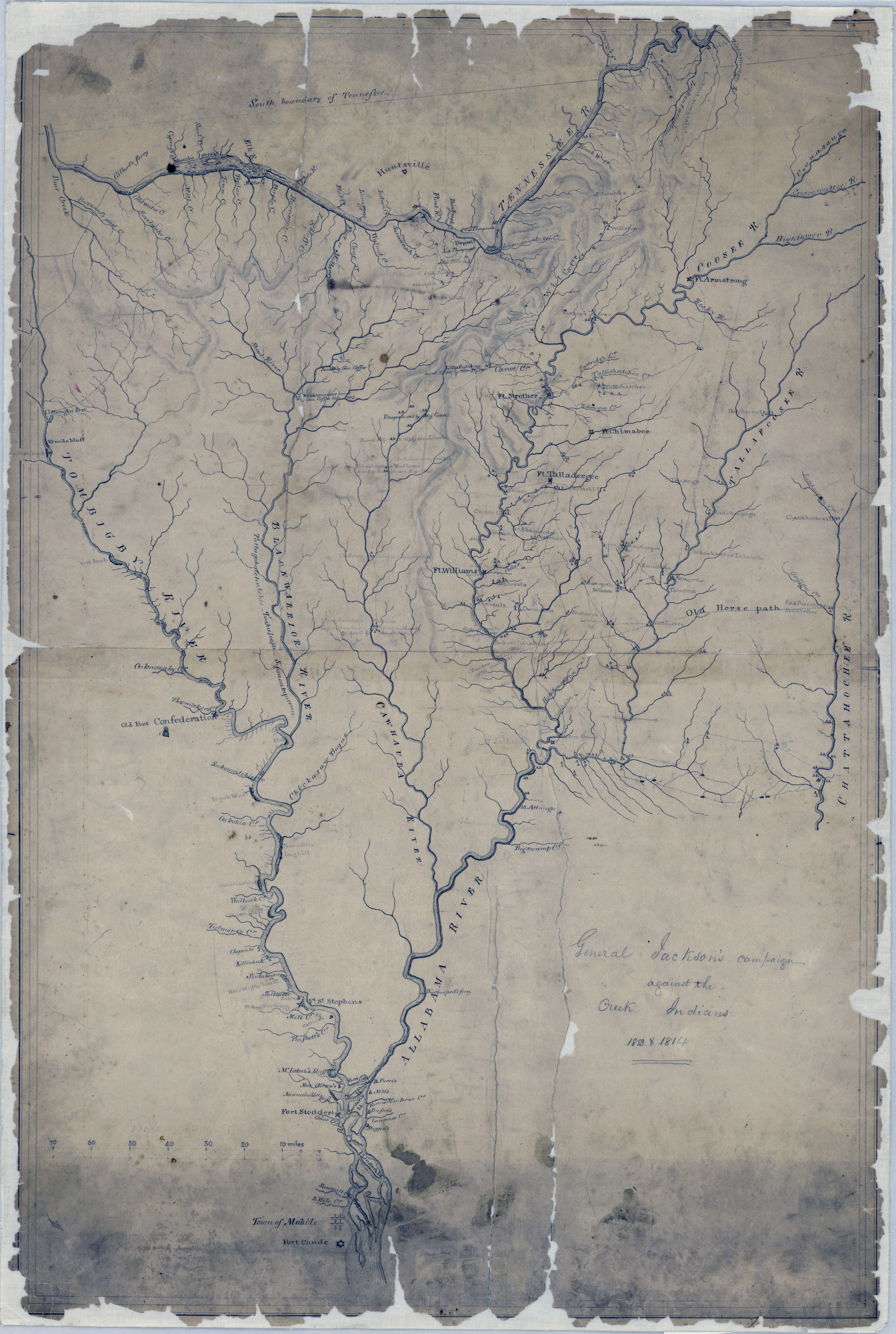
"General Jackson's campaign against the Creek Indians 1813 & 1814", showing the Muscle Shoals of the Tennessee River and the Alabama River watershed

News of the Fort Mims massacre reached Nashville on September 12. In October, Jackson took command of 2,500 Tennessee militiamen and a group of Jackson-aligned Muscogee warriors. Jackson sent aide John S. Reid to Fayetteville, Tennessee, to address the gathering force. As described by Parton in 1860, in volume one of his three-volume biography of Old Hickory, "He could not mount his horse without assistance when the time came for him to move toward the rendezvous. His left arm was bound and in a sling. He could not wear his coat-sleeve; nor, during any part of his military career, could he long endure on his left shoulder the weight of an epaulette." On October 11, 1813, Jackson departed Fayetteville for the war, heading toward Huntsville. Kanon, writing in Tohopeka: Rethinking the Creek War and the War of 1812, describes Jackson as living with "constant physical pain" during the Creek War and beyond. Kanon argues, "Historians should not be too quick in dismissing the fact that Jackson suffered from severe diarrhea and dysentery throughout the war, not to mention a bullet he carried in his left arm from a gunshot received during a fracas in Nashville prior to embarking on the campaign." Broadly speaking, though, the Creek War was to be a boon for Andrew Jackson. As Bettina Drew wrote in her influential thesis, Master Andrew Jackson: Indian Removal and the Culture of Slavery, "He was about to begin removing the Indians, and the war of 1812 would cure his depression...while the United States government wanted only to end hostilities, restore order, and punish the hostile Creeks, it was sending a general who wanted to destroy the Creek Nation; this was the first time, but not the last, that Jackson would try to make national policy, based on his own prejudices, at the point of a gun."

=== Other participants ===
- Alexander Donelson: Sandy Donelson served as an aide-de-camp to Coffee during the Creek War. Donelson was shot in the head and killed at the Battle of Emuckfaw Creek, four months after the brawl, on January 22, 1814.
- Eli Hammond: Eli Hammond organized a horse-mounted ranger regiment that contributed substantially to the American victories in least two Creek War battles, Tallusahatchee, and Tohopeka in the horseshoe bend of the Tallapoosa River.
- Stockley D. Hays: In 1830, 17 years after the fight, President Jackson communicated to still another nephew (there were dozens), "I intend to [do] something for [nephew Stockley D. Hays] as soon as it can be with propriety, but you know, under such a pressure for office, how hard it is to get a connection in, without great censure." President Jackson's endeavors for Hays triggered a long-running political battle with Davy Crockett, U.S. Representative from Tennessee, and George Poindexter, U.S. Senator from Mississippi, complete with charges of nepotism and abuse of the patronage system, and Congressional investigations that found evidence of corrupt land speculation by federal officers responsible for the public lands.
- Thomas Hart Benton: In the immediate aftermath of the fight, T. H. Benton is supposed to have written to a friend, "I am literally in hell here ... the meanest wretches under heaven to contend with—liars, affidavit-makers, and shameless cowards." T. H. Benton and Jackson reconciled on the eve of the 1824 presidential campaign and were ever after the closest of political allies. "Old Bullion" Benton aided Jackson in smashing Nicholas Biddle's bank, and he was largely responsible for expunging Jackson's Senate censure.
- Jesse Benton: Jesse Benton supported Treasury Secretary William H. Crawford for president in 1824 and anyone but Jackson thereafter, publishing detailed public letters criticizing Jackson's alleged corruption and enumerating his perceived character flaws. On the occasion of the 1828 presidential election, Benton declared, "I often told my brother, in 1813, that God was angry with Jackson for his crimes and permitted his attempt to assassinate us on the very spot where I now sit, in order to make us the instrument of his punishment." According to an 1873 history of Memphis, Tennessee, in 1828, Jackson and Jesse Benton had a second fight, at the Bell Tavern on the Chickasaw Bluffs overlooking the Mississippi River, and on that occasion Benton was beaten. In 1836, J. Benton and fellow Jackson opponent Davy Crockett traveled together toward the Alamo in San Antonio, Texas, but Benton peeled off at the last minute to recruit more bodies to garrison the Texian stockade, and thus avoided Crockett's fate of being killed by the Mexican Army.

== See also ==
- List of violent incidents involving Andrew Jackson
- List of duels in the United States
- Bibliography of Andrew Jackson
- Jonathan Thompson (lawyer) § Pursuit of Andrew Jackson for debts

== Sources ==
- Braund, Kathryn E. Holland, ed. (2012). Tohopeka: Rethinking the Creek War and the War of 1812. Tuscaloosa: University of Alabama Press. ISBN 978-0-8173-5711-5. LCCN 2012005530. OCLC 809411101. Project MUSE book 17284.
- Cheathem, Mark R. (2014). Andrew Jackson, Southerner. Baton Rouge, Louisiana: Louisiana State University Press. ISBN 978-0-8071-5099-3. LCCN 2012049695. OCLC 858995561. Project MUSE book 26506.
- Coffee, John (April 1901). "Letters from Gen. Coffee". The American Historical Magazine. 6 (2): 174–190. ISSN 2333-8970. JSTOR 42657529.
- Deppisch, Ludwig M.; Centeno, Jose A.; Gemmel, David J.; Torres, Norca L. (August 11, 1999). "Andrew Jackson's Exposure to Mercury and Lead: Poisoned President?". JAMA. 282 (6): 569–571. doi:10.1001/jama.282.6.569. ISSN 0098-7484. PMID 10450719.
- Drew, Bettina Lee (December 2001). Master Andrew Jackson: Indian Removal and the Culture of Slavery (Thesis). Yale University. UMI 3030759. ProQuest 3030759.
- Eriksson, Erik McKinley (January 1925). "Official Newspaper Organs and the Campaign of 1828". Tennessee Historical Magazine. 8 (4): 231–247. ISSN 2333-9012. JSTOR 42637502.
- Golden, Gabriel Hawkins (April 1925). "William Carroll and His Administration". Tennessee Historical Magazine. 9 (1). Tennessee Historical Society: 9–30. ISSN 2333-9012. JSTOR 42637999.
- Harlan, Louis R. (March 1948). "Public Career of William Berkeley Lewis". Tennessee Historical Quarterly. 7 (1): 3–37. ISSN 0040-3261. JSTOR 42620964.
- Jackson, Andrew (1984). Moser, Harold; Macpherson, Sharon (eds.). The Papers of Andrew Jackson, Volume II, 1804–1813. Knoxville: University of Tennessee Press. doi:10.7290/utp3038. ISBN 978-0-87049-441-3. LCCN 79015078.
- ——— (1991). Moser, Harold; Hoth, David; Macpherson, Sharon; Reinbold, John (eds.). The Papers of Andrew Jackson, Volume III, 1814–1815. University of Tennessee Press. doi:10.7290/utp9085. ISBN 978-0-87049-650-9.
- ——— (2010). Feller, Daniel; Coens, Thomas; Moss, Laura-Eve (eds.). The Papers of Andrew Jackson, Volume VIII, 1830. University of Tennessee Press. doi:10.7290/utp6455. ISBN 978-1-57233-715-2.
- Kanon, Tom (2014). Tennesseans at War, 1812–1815: Andrew Jackson, the Creek War, and the Battle of New Orleans. Tuscaloosa: University of Alabama Press. ISBN 9780817318291. LCCN 2013049815. OCLC 900093586. Project MUSE book 30812.
- Mueller, Ken (2014). Senator Benton and the People: Master Race Democracy on the Early American Frontier. Early American Places. Ithaca, New York: Cornell University Press. ISBN 9781501757556. OCLC 1203952026. Project MUSE book 83601.
- Parton, James (1860a). Life of Andrew Jackson, Volume 1. New York: Mason Brothers. LCCN 11016613. OCLC 3897681. OL 2519658W.
- Remini, Robert V. (1977). Andrew Jackson and the Course of American Empire, 1767–1821. New York: Harper & Row. ISBN 978-0-8018-5912-0. LCCN 77003766. OCLC 1145801830.
- Smith, Elbert B. (February 1958). Catton, Bruce (ed.). "'Now Defend Yourself, You Damned Rascal!'". American Heritage. Vol. IX, no. 2. Illustrated by Marshall Davis. pp. 44–48, 106. ISSN 0002-8738. OCLC 1479963.
