= United States Attorney for the District of Kentucky =

Defunct U.S. federal prosecutor's office

United States Attorney for the District of Kentucky is a defunct United States Attorney's office. The office was created in 1789. On February 12, 1901, the United States Congress passed an act dividing the District of Kentucky into two districts, creating the offices of United States Attorney for the Eastern District of Kentucky, headquartered in Covington, and the United States Attorney for the Western District of Kentucky, headquartered in Louisville.

== List of office holders ==
- George Nicholas (1789)
- James Brown (1791)
- William Murry (1791–1793)
- George Nicholas (1793)
- John Breckinridge (1793–1794)
- William McClung (1794–1796)
- William Clark (1796–1800)
- Joseph Hamilton Daviess (1800–1806)
- George M. Bibb (1807–1808)
- Robert Trimble (1813–1816)
- George M. Bibb (1819–1824)
- John J. Crittenden (1827–1829)
- Thomas Bell Monroe (1833–1834)
- Lewis Sanders Jr. (1834–1838)
- P. S. Loughborough (1838–1850)
- William H. Caperton (1850–1853)
- C. C. Rogers (1853–1861)
- Edward I. Buttock (1861)
- James M. Harlan (1861–1863)
- Thomas E. Bramlette (1863)
- Joshua Tevis (1863–1864)
- B. H. Bristow (1866–1870)
- Gabriel C. Wharton (1870–1876)
- H. F. Finley (1876–1877)
- Gabriel C. Wharton (1877–1881)
- George M. Thomas (1881–1885)
- John C. Wickliffe (1885–1889)
- George W. Jolly (1889–1894)
- William M. Smith (1894–1898)
