= Danielsen =

Danielsen is a Nordic surname, originally meaning son of Daniel. Notable people with the surname include:

- Åge Danielsen (born 1942), Norwegian civil servant
- Anders Danielsen Lie (born 1979), Norwegian actor and musician
- André Danielsen (born 1985), Norwegian footballer
- Arnbjørn Danielsen (born 1973), Faroese footballer
- Atli Danielsen (born 1983), Faroese footballer
- Claus Bech-Danielsen, Danish architecture professor
- Daniel Jacob Danielsen (1871–1916), Danish-born Faroese missionary and humanitarian worker
- Dag Danielsen (born 1955), Norwegian politician
- Edvard Christian Danielsen (1888–1964), Norwegian naval officer
- Egil Danielsen (1933–2019), Norwegian javelin thrower
- Erling Danielsen (1922–2010), Norwegian politician
- Finn Danielsen (born 1955), Danish sports shooter
- Frídrún Danielsen (born 1991), Faroese footballer
- Harry Danielsen (1936–2011), Norwegian educator and politician
- Henrik Danielsen (born 1966), Danish-Icelandic chess grandmaster
- Hilde Gaebpie Danielsen (born 1981), Norwegian politician
- Jan Werner Danielsen (1976–2006), Norwegian singer
- Jóannes Danielsen (born 1997), Faroese footballer
- Joen Danielsen (1843–1926), Faroese poet
- Joseph Danielsen, American politician
- John Danielsen (born 1939), Danish footballer
- Kristin Danielsen (orienteer), Norwegian orienteer
- Kristin Danielsen (born 1972), Norwegian dancer, choreographer, cultural administrator
- Mikkjal Danielsen (born 1960), Faroese footballer
- Ole Danielsen, former member of the band Tonic Breed
- Otto Gunnar Danielsen (1911–1958), Danish sailor
- Rebekka Danielsen (born 2000), Faroese footballer
- Reidar Danielsen (1916–2000), Norwegian civil servant
- Robert Danielsen (1905–1973), Norwegian footballer
- Rolf Danielsen (1922–2002), Norwegian educator, author and historian
- Sean Danielsen (born 1982), American musician and artistic painter
- Steen Danielsen (born 1950), Danish footballer
- Steffan Danielsen (1922–1976), Faroese painter
- Tone Danielsen (born 1946), Norwegian actress
- Trine Lotherington Danielsen (born 1967), Norwegian politician
- Thomas Danielsen (born 1983), Danish politician
- Victor Danielsen (1894–1961), Faroese missionary
- Vince Danielsen (born 1971), Canadian football player
- William Danielsen (1915–1989), Norwegian footballer and coach

== Other ==
- MV Karen Danielsen, multipurpose container feeder, built in March 1985 by J.J. Sietas KG

== See also ==
- Danielsan (disambiguation)
- Danielson (disambiguation)
- Danielsson (disambiguation)
- Denílson (disambiguation)
- Donelson (disambiguation)
