= Danielson =

Danielson may refer to:

- Danielson (band), an American rock band.
- Danielson, Connecticut, a borough in the U.S. state of Connecticut
- Danielson (surname)
- Danielson (crater), an impact crater in the Oxia Palus quadrangle on Mars
- Danielson (footballer) (born 1981), Danielson Ferreira Trindade, Brazilian footballer

== See also ==
- Danielsson (disambiguation)
- Danielsen (disambiguation)
- Danielsan (disambiguation)
- Denílson (disambiguation)
- Donelson (disambiguation)
