= Donelson =

Donelson may refer to:

- Fort Donelson, near Nashville, Tennessee
  - Battle of Fort Donelson
- Donelson, Tennessee, a suburb of Nashville
- Donelson Christian Academy Christian school in Donelson
- USS Fort Donelson, a ship in the American Civil War
- Donelson (surname)
- Donelson Caffery, American politician

== See also ==
- Danielson (disambiguation)
- Danielsson (disambiguation)
- Danielsen (disambiguation)
- Danielsan (disambiguation)
- Denílson (disambiguation)
