= Chris Daniels =

Chris Daniels can refer to:

- Christopher Daniels (born 1970), American wrestler
- Chris Daniels (basketball) (born 1984), American basketball player
- Chris Daniels (musician) (born 1952), American musician
- Christian Danielsson (born 1966), Swedish photographer
