= Danielsan =

Danielsan may refer to:

- Danielsan Ichiban (born Daniel Elleson, 1975), New Zealand producer/DJ/musician and half of the Australian hip hop duo Koolism
- Karen Danielsan (1885–1952), birth name of German psychoanalyst, Karen Horney

== See also ==
- Daniel-san
- Denílson (disambiguation)
- Danielson (disambiguation)
- Danielsson (disambiguation)
- Danielsen (disambiguation)
- Donelson (disambiguation)
