= Donelson (surname) =

Origin
- Language: Scottish Gaelic
- Meaning: "Son of Donald/Donnell"
- Region of origin: Scotland

Other names
- Variant forms: Donaldson, MacDonald, McDonald, Macdonald, MacDonnell, MacDonell

Donelson is a surname of Scottish origin and it is a variant of the name Donaldson which is a patronymic for the name Donald. Donaldson is also an English rendering of the name MacDonald. The name MacDonald in some cases became Donaldson and due to pronunciation of the name it corrupted to Donelson. Notable people with the surname include:

- Andrew Jackson Donelson (1799–1871), American diplomat
- Daniel Smith Donelson (1802–1863), American soldier and politician
- Emily Donelson (1807–1836), American, niece of Rachel
- John Donelson (1718–1785), American frontiersman and politician
- John Lawrence Donelson (1829–1864), Confederate States Army officer
- Rachel Donelson (1767–1828), American wife of Andrew Jackson

== See also ==
- Donelson family
