= Denílson =

Denílson is a Portuguese given name. Among people with this name are:

== Football ==
- Denílson (footballer, born 1943) (1943–2024), Denílson Custódio Machado, attacking midfielder
- Denilson (footballer, born 1972), Denilson Antonio Paludo, midfielder
- Denílson (footballer, born 1976), Denílson Martins Nascimento, striker
- Denílson (footballer, born 1977), Denílson de Oliveira Araújo, forward, former Real Betis player and Brazil international
- Denilson (footballer, born 1987), Denilson Hernandes Santos Sineiro, Brazilian football full-back
- Denílson (footballer, born 1988), Denílson Pereira Neves, midfielder, former São Paulo and Arsenal player
- Denílson (footballer, born 1995), Denílson Pereira Júnior, striker
- Denilson (footballer, born 1998), Denílson da Silva dos Santos, forward
- Denilson (footballer, born 2000), Denilson Rodrigues Roldão, Brazilian footballer
- Denilson (footballer, born 2001), Denilson Alves Borges, Brazilian footballer
- Denilson Costa (born 1968), Brazilian-born Honduras international and forward
- Denílson Gabionetta (born 1985), winger

== Other ==
- Denílson Lourenço (born 1977), Brazilian judoka

== See also ==
- Danielson (disambiguation)
- Danielsson (disambiguation)
- Danielsen (disambiguation)
- Danielsan (disambiguation)
- Donelson (disambiguation)
