= Danielson (surname) =

Danielson is a surname literally meaning "son of Daniel". Notable people with the name include:

- Aaron Danielson (died 2020), far-left activist who was shot dead
- Bryan Danielson (born 1981), known in WWE as Daniel Bryan, American professional wrestler
- Brianna Danielson (born 1983), known in WWE as Brie Bella, American professional wrestler and wife of Bryan Danielson
- David Danielson (1947–2021), American politician
- Gary Danielson (born 1951), American football player and broadcaster
- G. C. Danielson, American professor
- Nate Danielson (born 2004), Canadian ice hockey player
- Peter A. Danielson (born 1946), Philosopher and professor
