= Danielsson =

Daníelsson or Danielsson is a surname. Notable people with the surname include:

- Alx Danielsson (born 1981), Swedish racing driver
- Anders Danielsson (born 1953), director-general for the Swedish Security Service
- Axel Danielsson (1863–1899), Swedish socialist agitator, journalist and writer from Värmland
- Bengt Danielsson (1921–1997), anthropologist and member on the Kon-Tiki raft expedition
- Björn Danielsson (born 1977), Swedish ice hockey player and coach
- Christian Danielsson (born 1966), Swedish photographer
- Einar Daníelsson (born 1970), retired footballer
- Elma Danielsson (1865–1936), politician and journalist
- Erik Danielsson, Swedish musician, Watain
- Gösta Danielsson (1912–1978), Swedish chess master
- Helgi Daníelsson (footballer, born 1933), Icelandic football player
- Helgi Daníelsson (footballer, born 1981), Icelandic football player
- Inge Danielsson (1941–2021), Swedish footballer
- Ivan Danielsson (1880–1963), Swedish diplomat
- Jon Danielsson (born 1963), Icelandic economist based in the UK
- Kikki Danielsson (born 1952), Swedish country, dansband and pop singer
- Lars Danielsson (born 1958), Swedish jazz bassist, composer and record producer
- Malin Danielsson (born 1977), Swedish politician
- Mats Danielsson, Swedish soldier who led the Swedish ISAF troops in Afghanistan
- Mia Danielsson (born 1980), Swedish politician
- Nicklas Danielsson (born 1984), Swedish ice hockey player
- Palle Danielsson (1946–2024), Swedish jazz double bassist from Stockholm
- Peter Danielsson (born 1974), Swedish politician
- Staffan Danielsson (born 1947), Swedish politician
- Sven-Erik Danielsson (born 1960), Swedish cross country skier
- Tage Danielsson (1928–1985), Swedish author, actor, poet and film director

== See also ==
- Denílson (disambiguation)
- Donelson (disambiguation)
- Danielsan (disambiguation)
