= Steen Danielsen =

Danish footballer (born 1950)

Personal information
- Date of birth: 27 January 1950 (age 76)
- Place of birth: Randers, Denmark
- Position: Defender

Senior career*
Years	Team	Apps	(Gls)
1973–1978	Randers Freja		

International career
1972–1973	Denmark U21	3	(0)
1974	Denmark	2	(0)
- * Club domestic league appearances and goals

Steen Danielsen (born 27 January 1950) is a Danish former footballer who played as a defender. He made two appearances for the Denmark national team in 1974.
