= Claus Bech-Danielsen =

Danish architecture professor

Claus Bech-Danielsen is a Danish professor in architecture and spatial planning at the Aalborg University, where he is also Head of Department at the Center for Housing Research.

As part of his research, Claus Bech-Danielsen has been the principal investigator of a project designed to evaluate the renovation of social housing between 2014-2016. Furthermore, he has single-handedly carried out a project which explored trends in house building with the aim to chart the direction of future projects.

== Education ==
Claus Bech-Danielsen graduated from the Aarhus School of Architecture in 1991 with an MA in Architecture. In 1996, he received PhD from The Royal Academy of Architecture in Copenhagen.

== Selected articles ==
- Architectural Transformation of Disadvantaged Housing Areas-Editors' Notes, C Bech-Danielsen, M Stender, M Mechlenborg NA 31 (1) 2019
- Reinventing co-housing in Denmark after the neoliberal turn SE Sollien, C Bech-Danielsen ENHR 2019
- Trends in housing construction C Bech-Danielsen Danish Architecture Center 2019
- The Politics Of Vernacular Influences In Danish Social Housing SE Sollien, C Bech-Danielsen, S Nielsen, AM Manelius Traditional Dwellings and Settlements Review 30 (1), 44-44 2018
