= Mikkjal Danielsen =

Faroese footballer (born 1960)

Personal information
- Date of birth: 16 May 1960 (age 66)
- Place of birth: Faroe Islands
- Position: Defender

Senior career*
Years	Team	Apps	(Gls)
1978–1993	MB Miðvágur		
1994–1997	FS Vágar	17	(2)

International career
1988–1992	Faroe Islands	17	(0)
- * Club domestic league appearances and goals

Mikkjal Danielsen (born 16 May 1960) is a Faroese retired football defender.
