= Danielson (crater) =

Crater on Mars

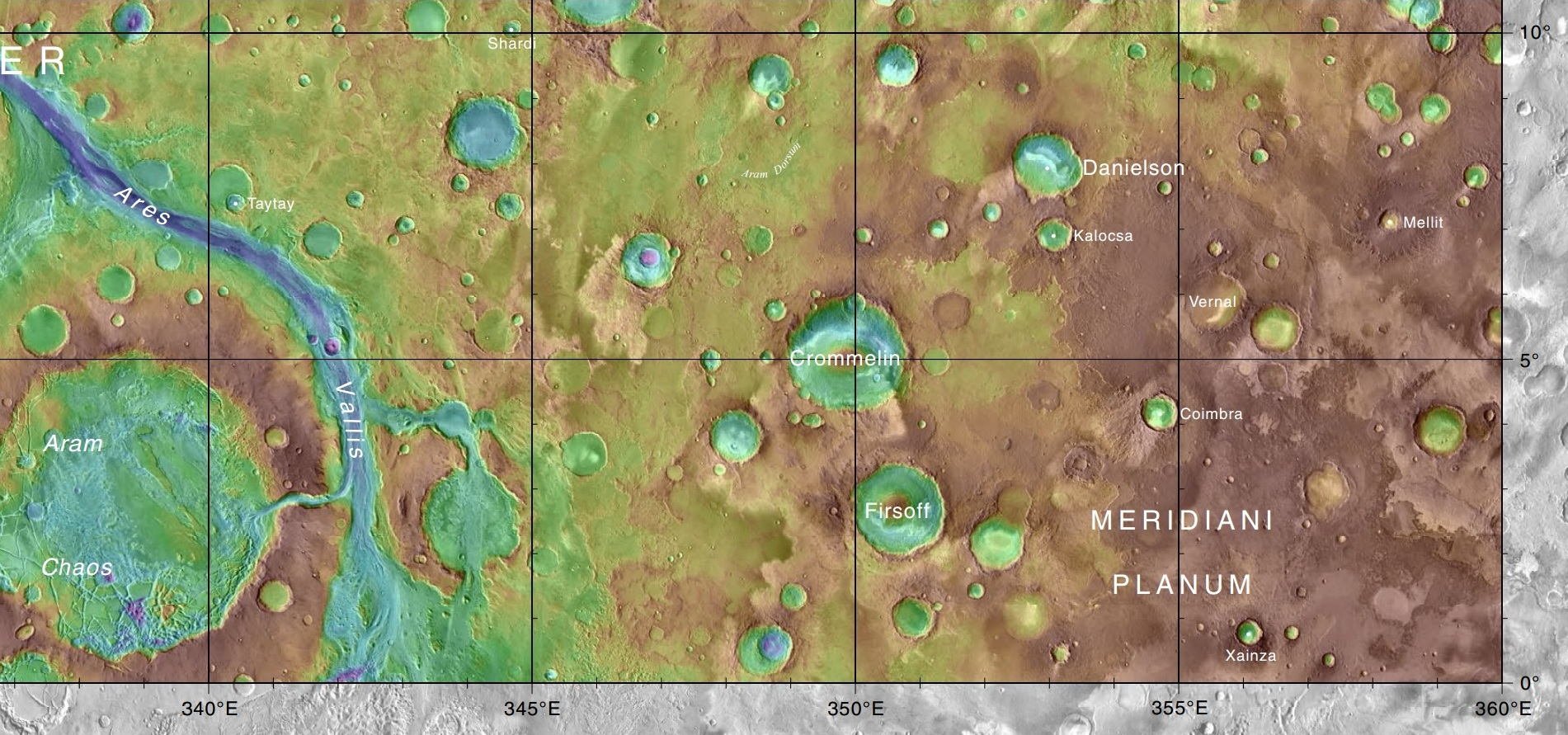
- .MOLA map showing Danielson Crater and other nearby craters. Colors indicate elevations. Danielson is on the top and mid-right
- Planet: Mars
- Region: Oxia Palus quadrangle
- Coordinates: 7.93°N 7.11°W
- Quadrangle: Oxia Palus
- Diameter: 66.7 km
- Eponym: G. Edward Danielson

Danielson is an impact crater in the Oxia Palus quadrangle on Mars at 7.93° N and 7.11° W. and is 66.7 km in diameter, and is north of the Meridiani Planum, south of Arabia Terra. Its name was approved in 2009, and it was named after American engineer G. Edward Danielson.

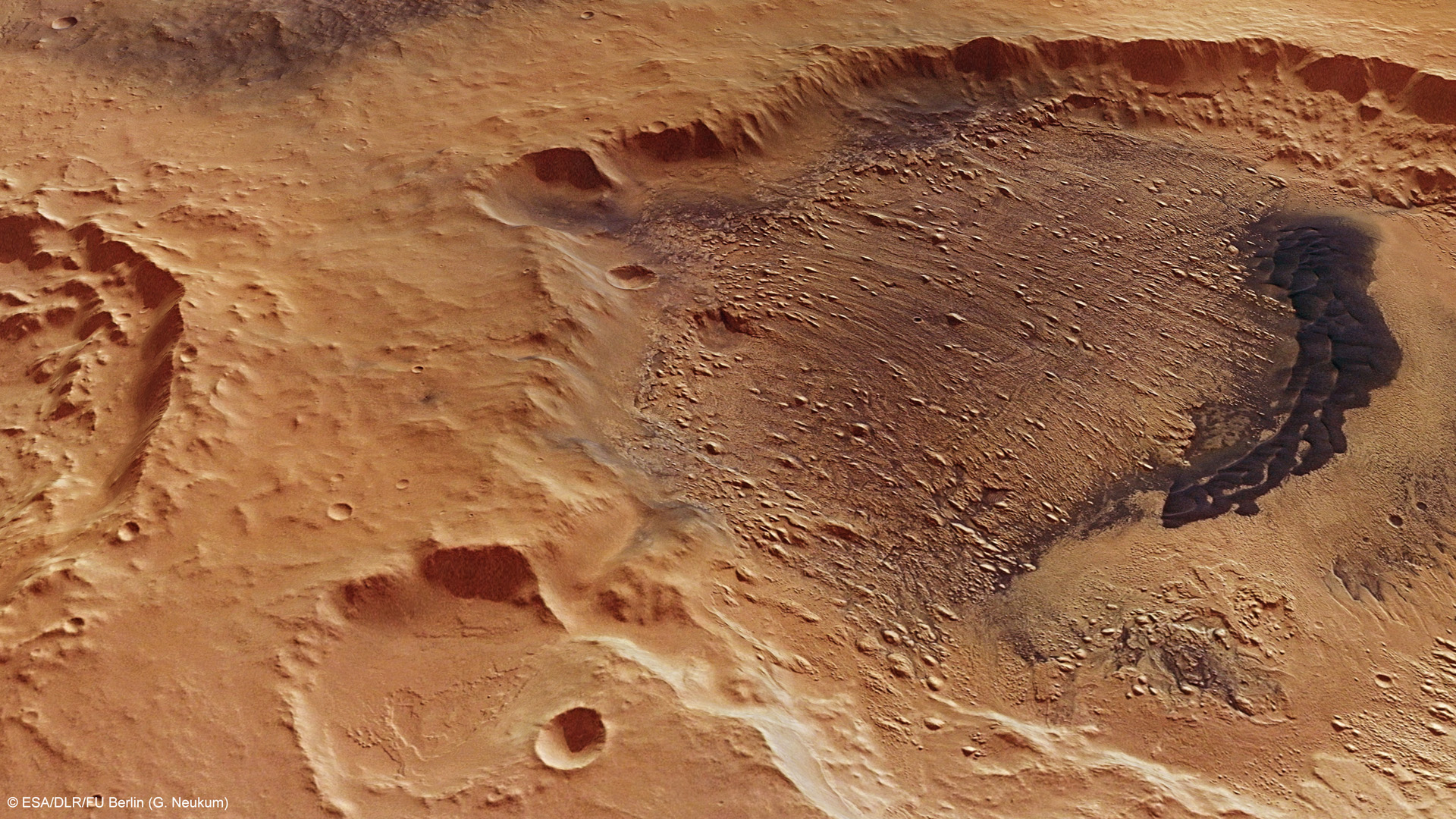
ESA's Mars Express photo of the southern part of Danielson and the northernmost rim of Kalocsa

Many close up images of the crater reveal multiple thin layers, some of which are broken by faults. The layers on the floor of Danielson may have been formed on the bottom of lakes.

== Gallery ==
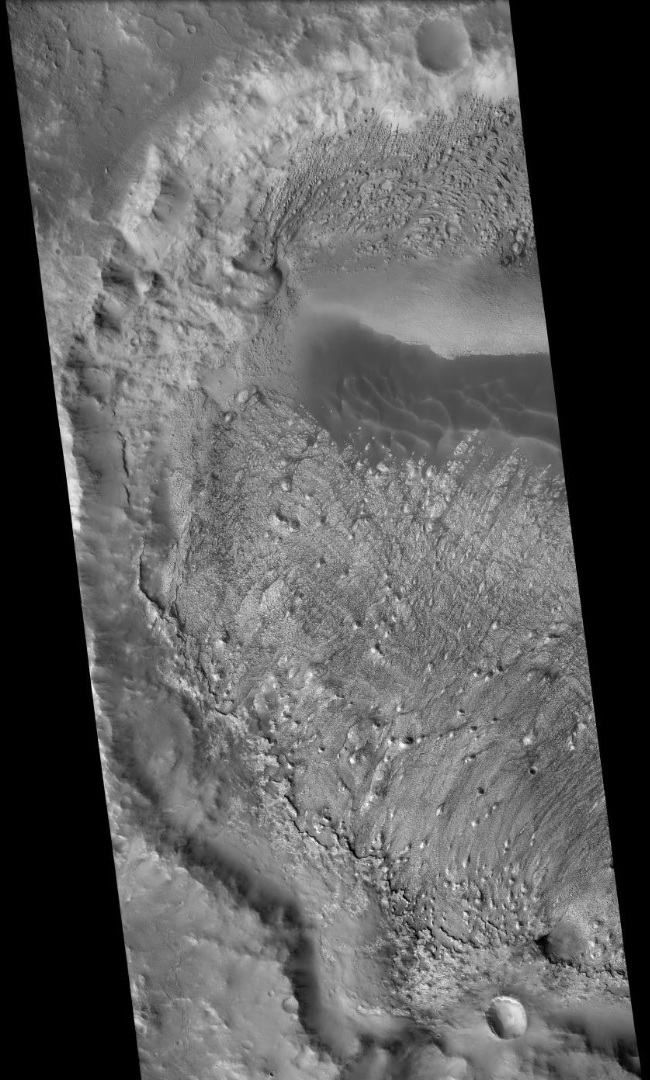
West side of Danielson crater, as seen by CTX camera (on Mars Reconnaissance Orbiter). Danielson has a great deal of regular layering.

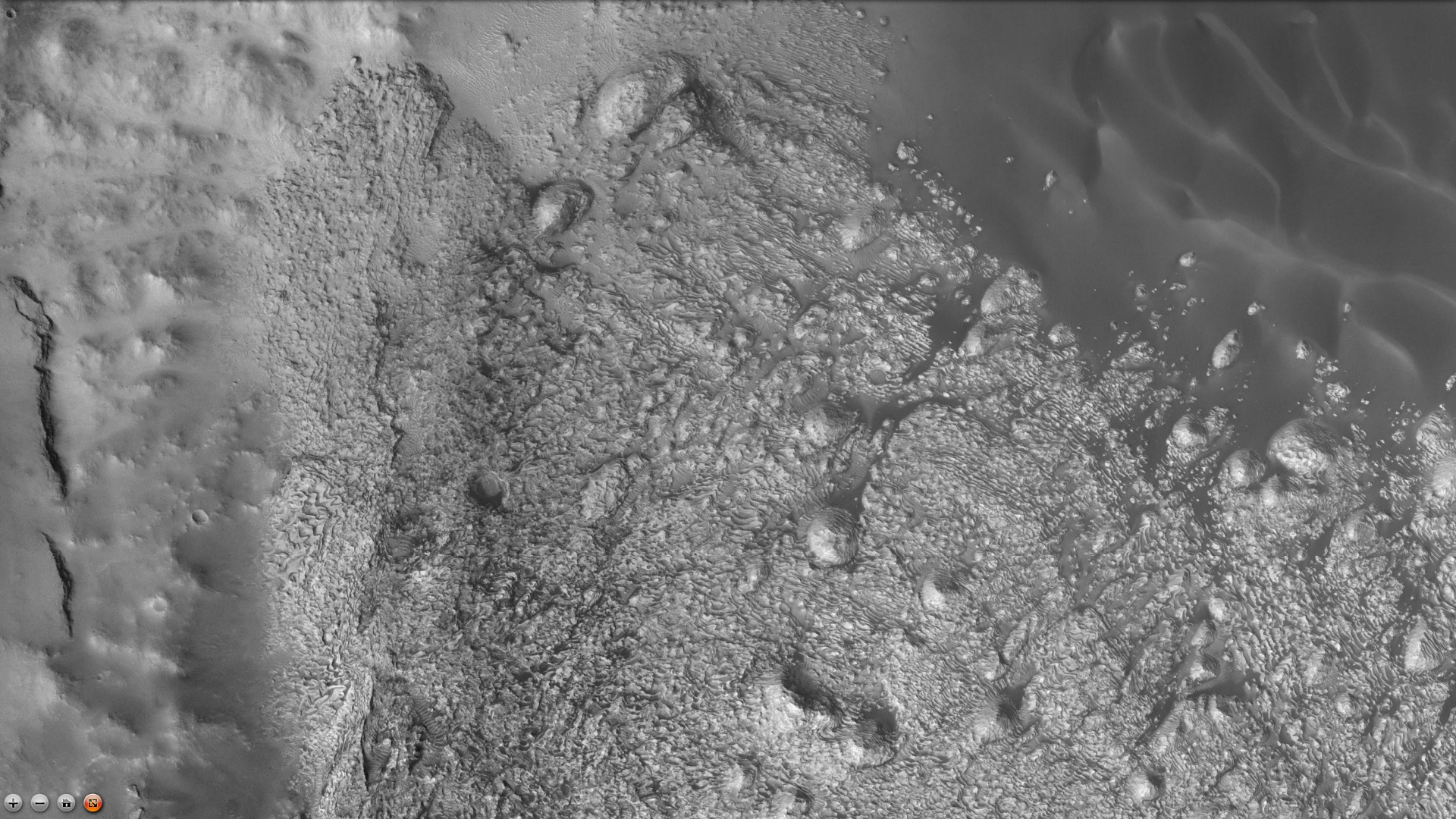
Some of the layers of Danielson are just visible in this CTX image. Dunes are also visible.

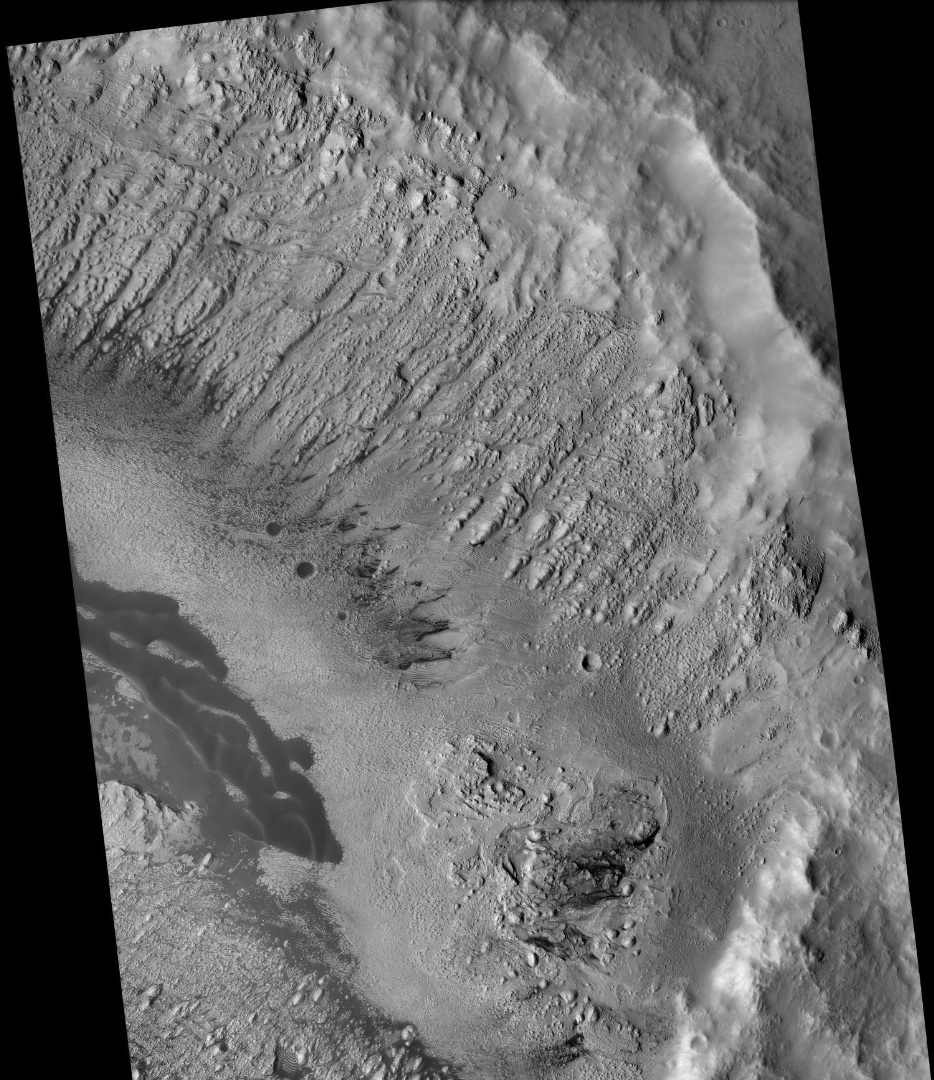
East side of Danielson, as seen by CTX camera. Many layers are present here, but barely visible.

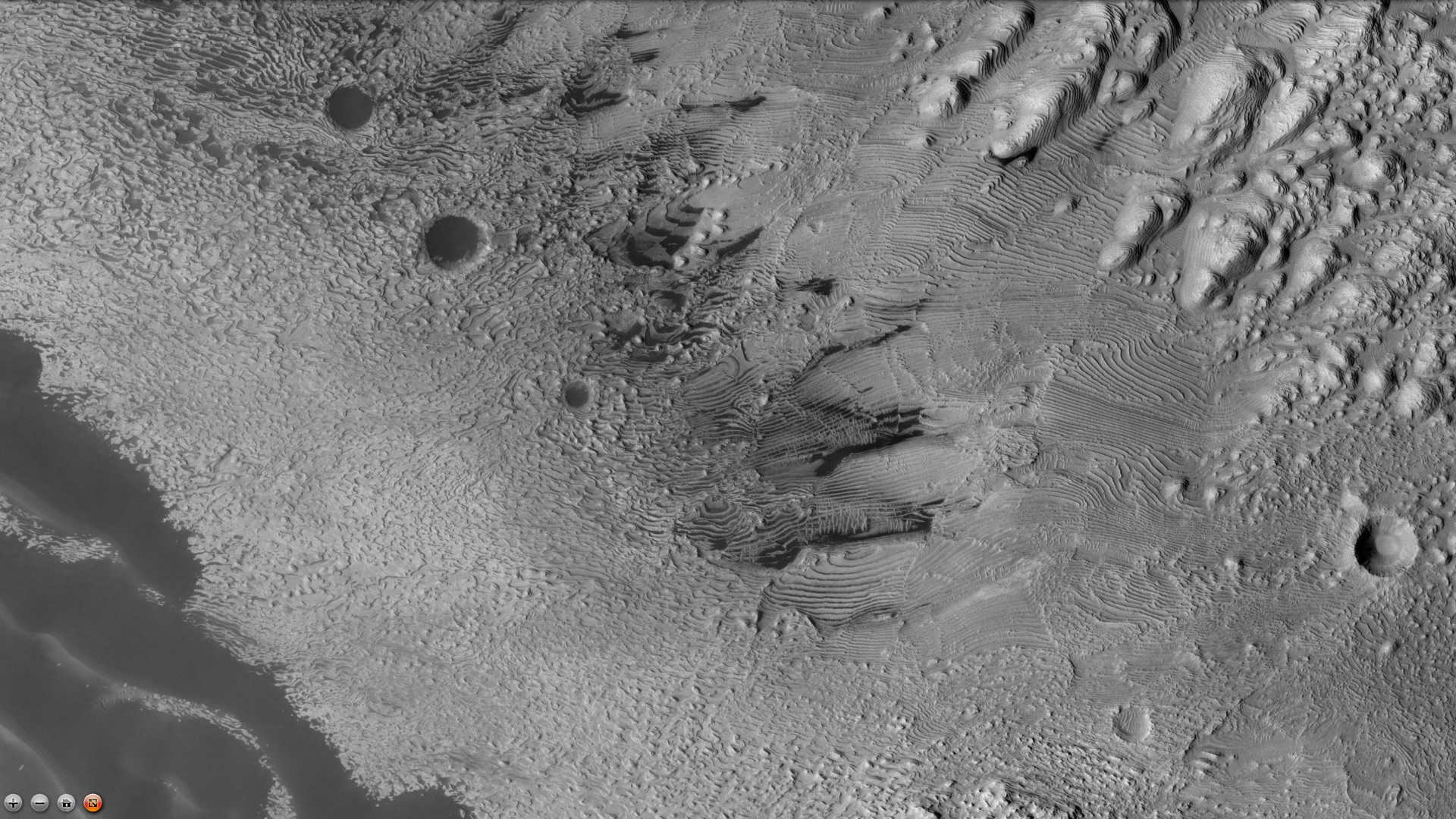
Layers in Danielson, as seen by CTX camera. Note: this is an enlargement of the previous image.

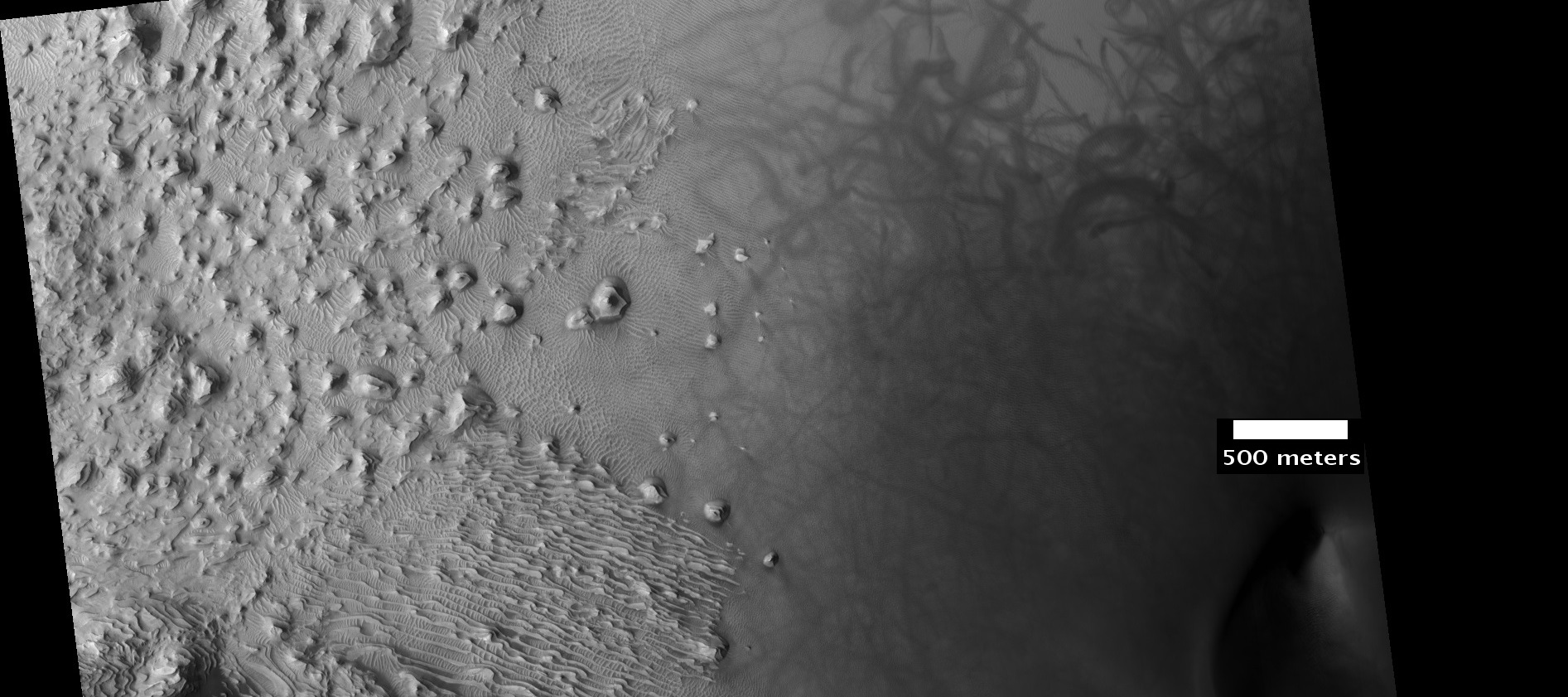
Layers in Danielson, as seen by HiRISE. Dust devil tracks are also visible at the top.

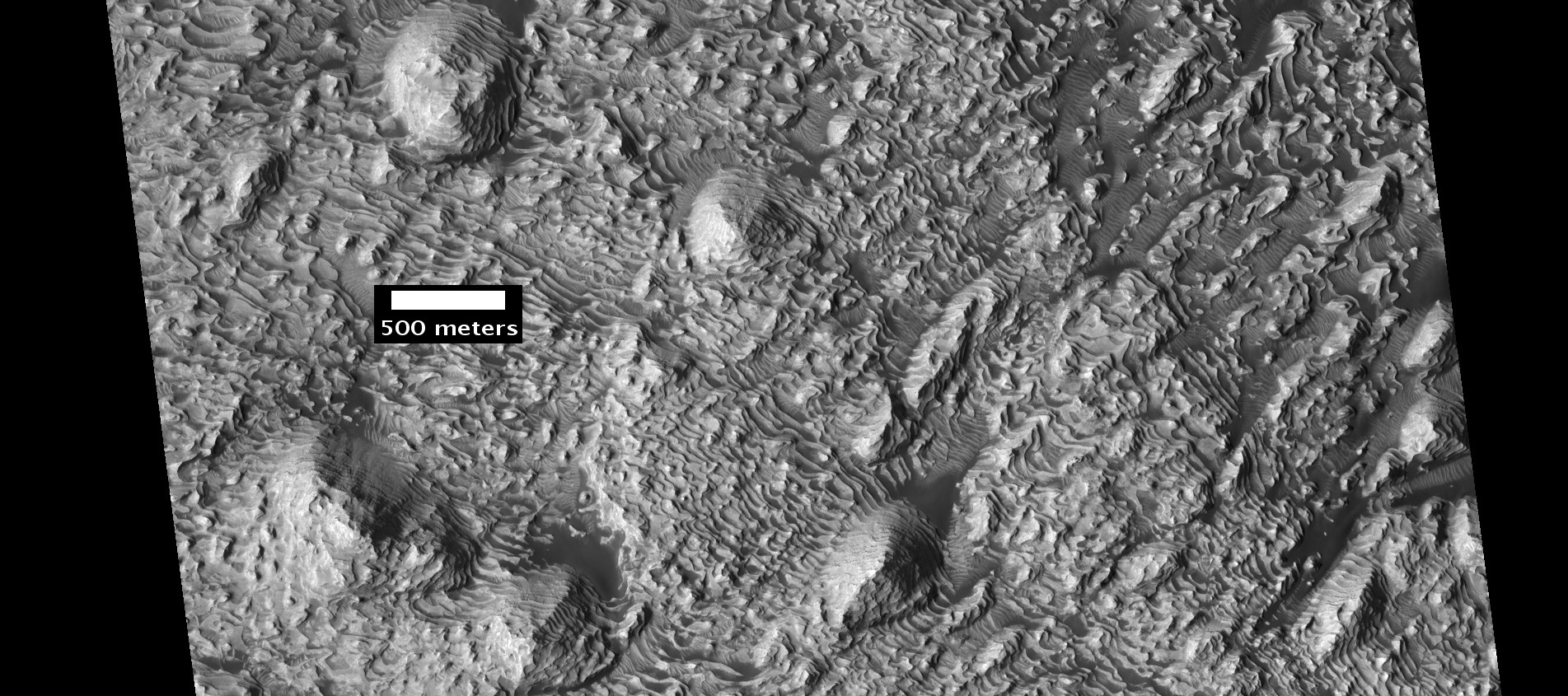
Many layers are visible in this HiRISE image. Dark dust serves to highlight some of the layers.

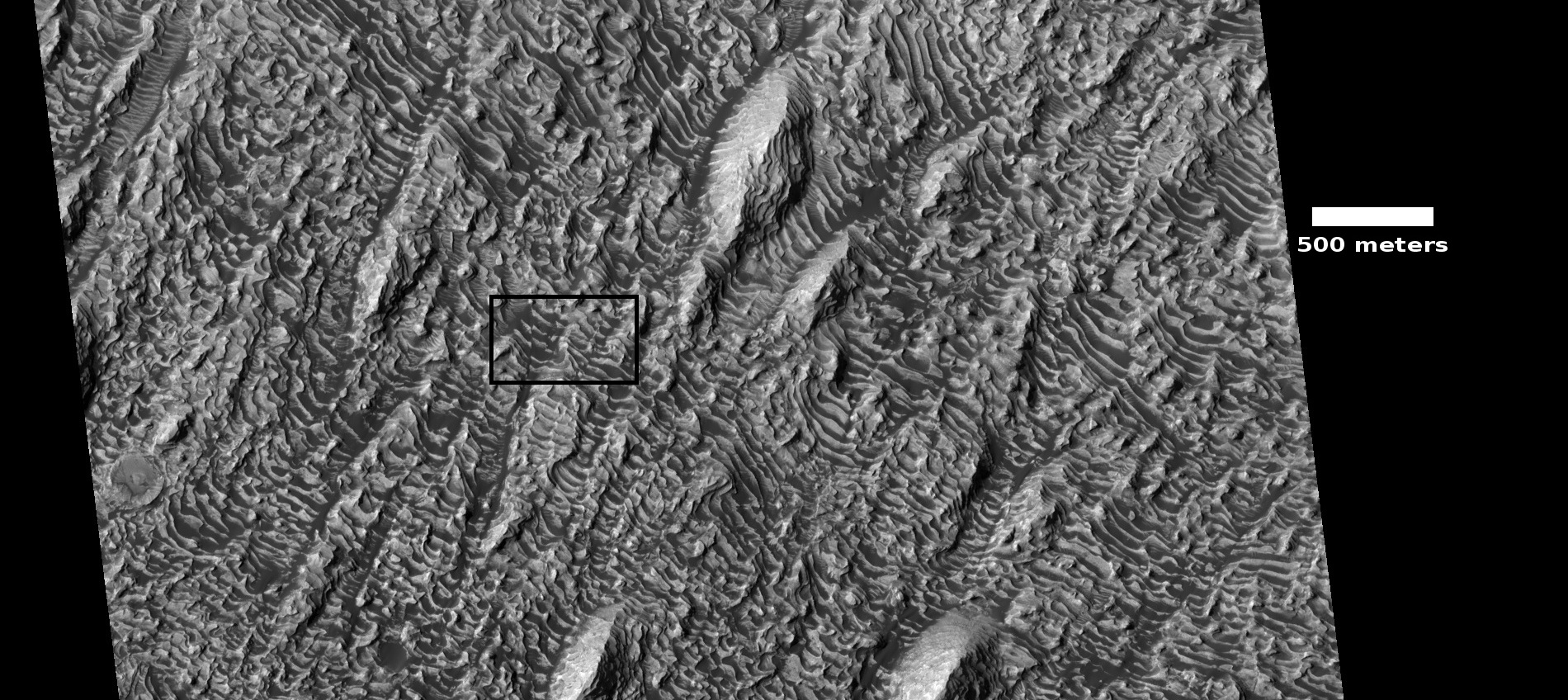
Wide-view of layers in Danielson, as seen by HiRISE under HiWish program. Box shows location of next image. Dark parts of image are dark, basalt sand sitting on level places.

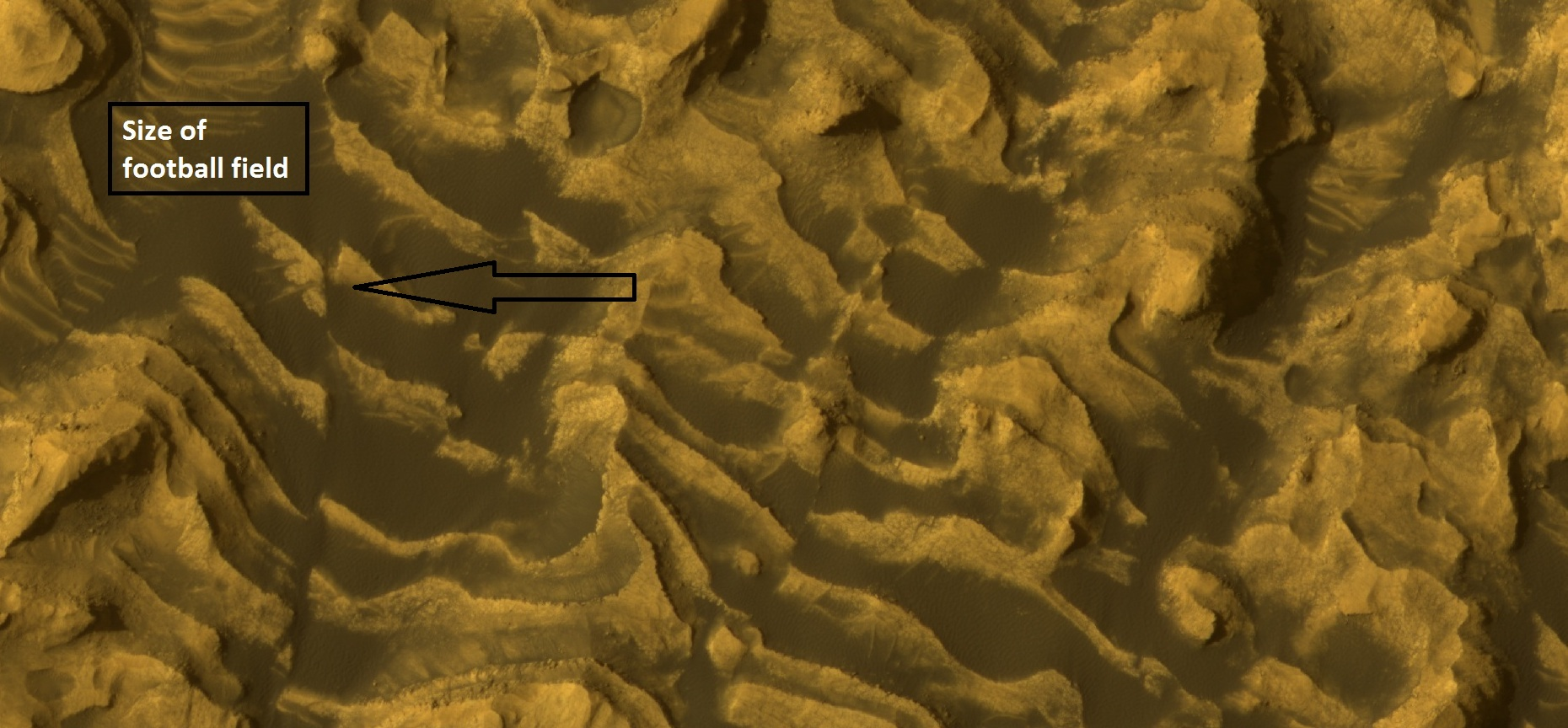
Enlargement of previous image showing a fault and layers. Image taken with HiRISE.

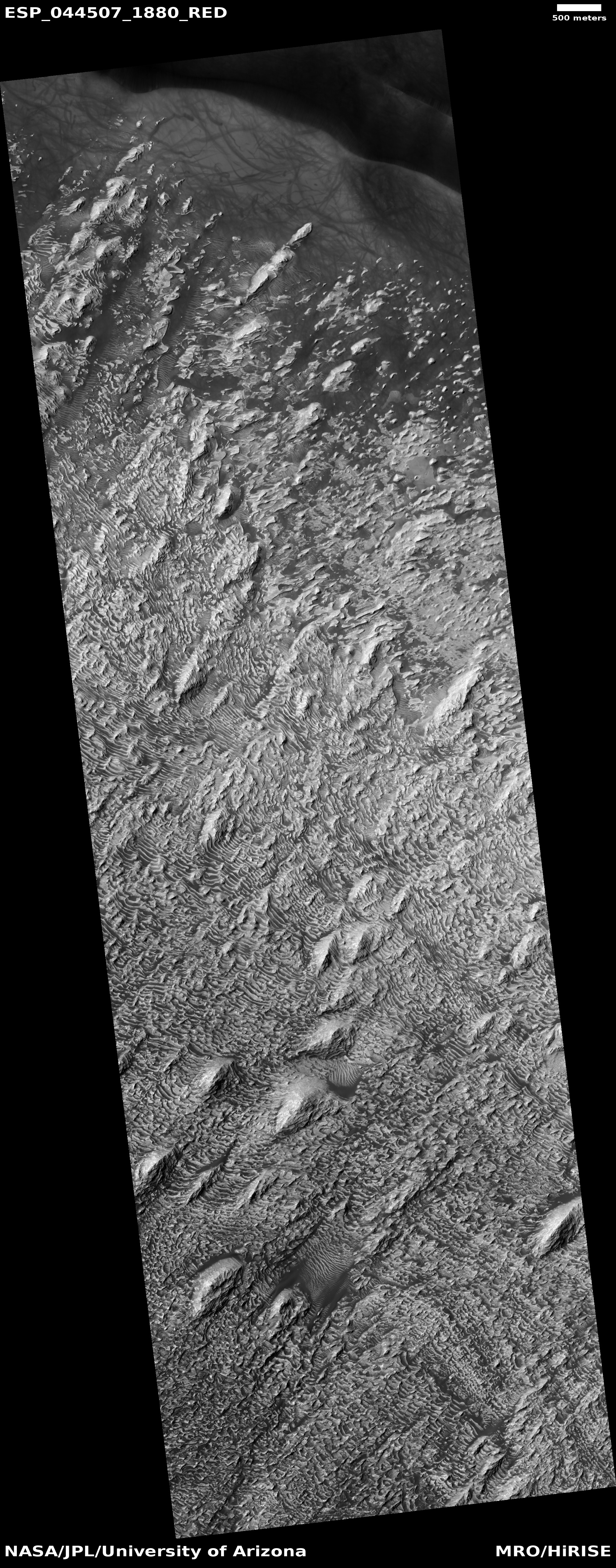
Wide view of part of Danielson, as seen by HiRISE

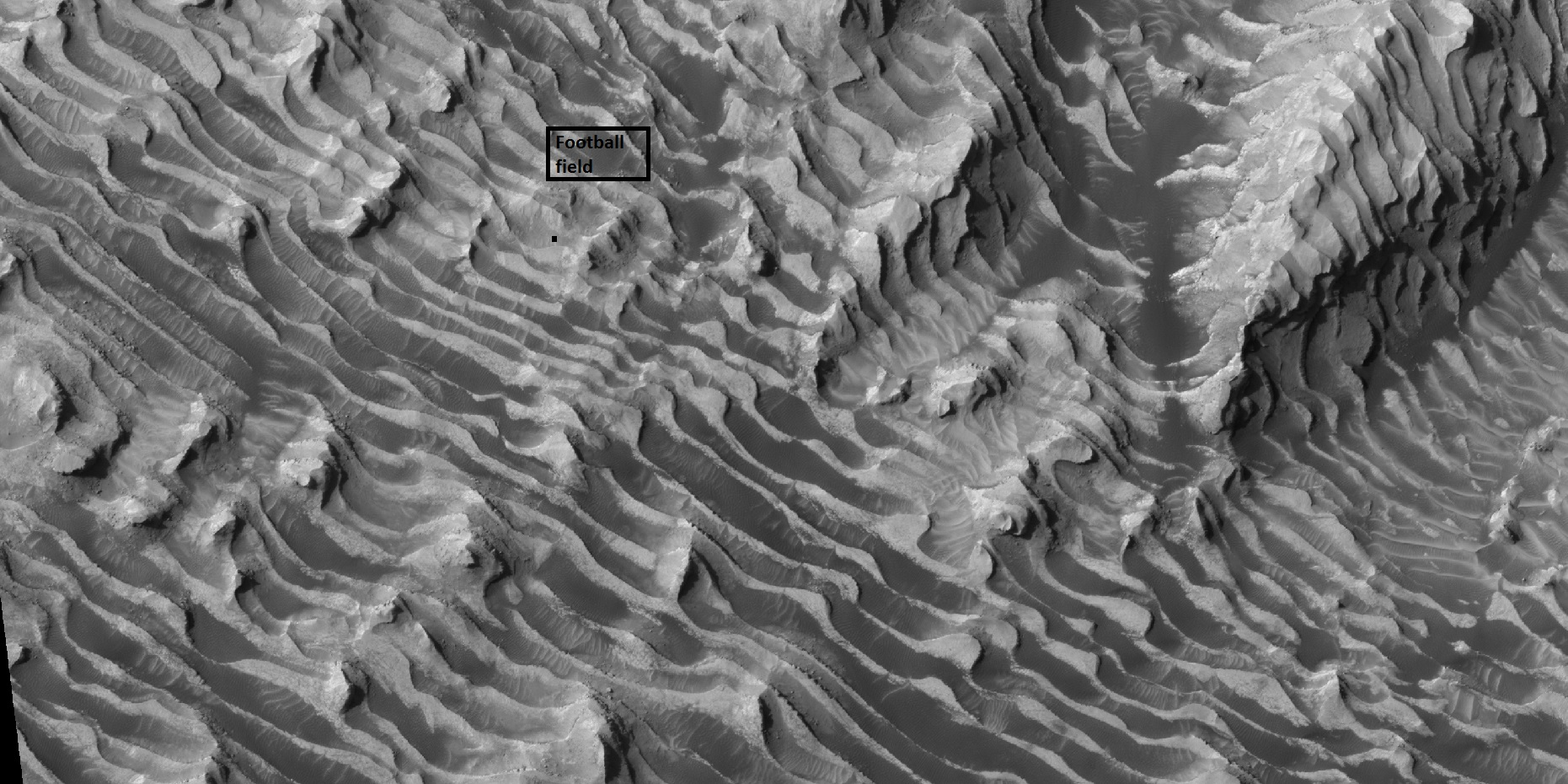
Enlargement of previous image, as seen by HiRISE. The box represents the size of a football field.

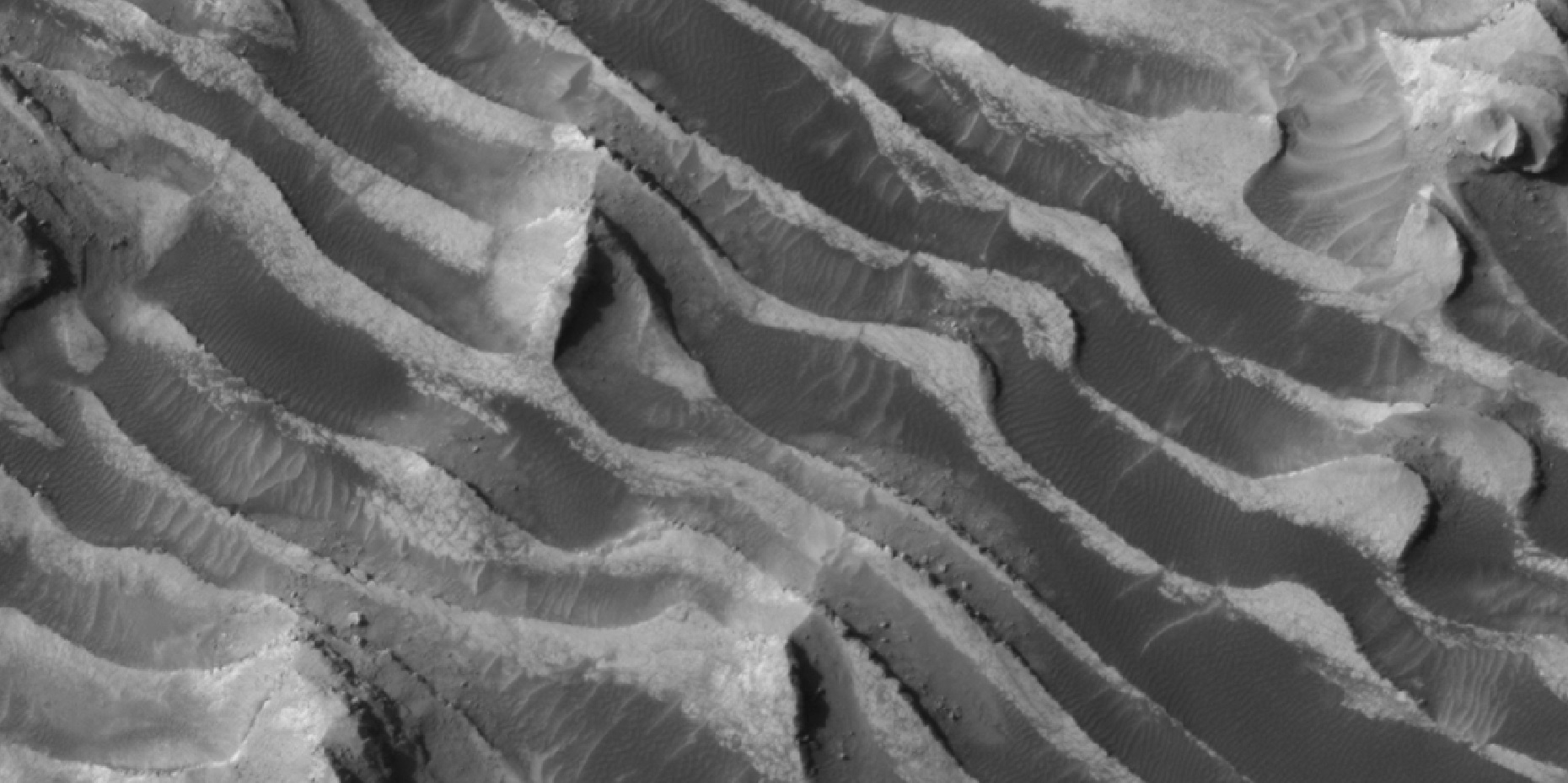
Close-up of layers, as seen by HiRISE. Boulders are visible, as well as dark sand.

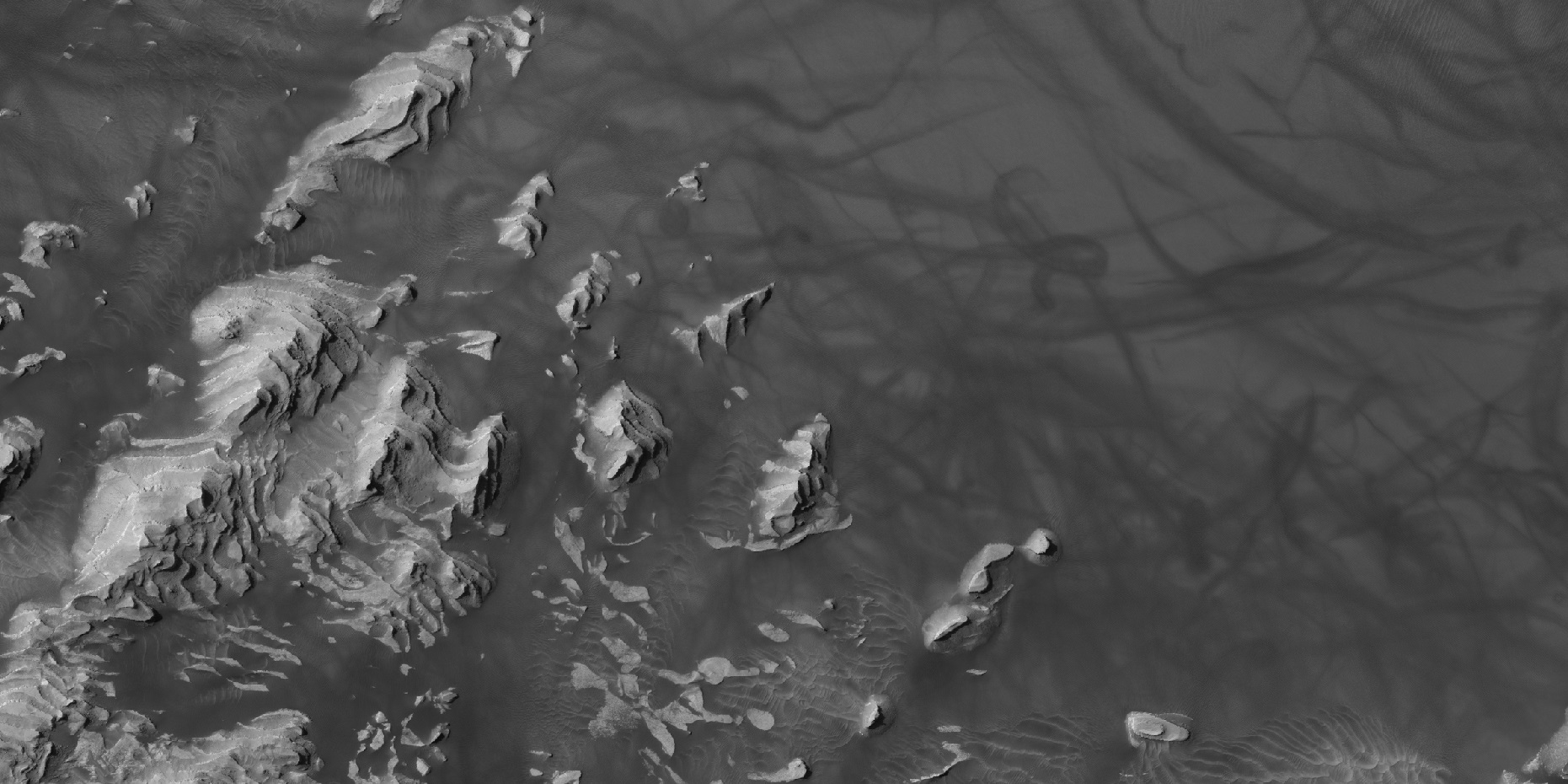
Layers with dust devil tracks at the top of the picture, as seen by HiRISE

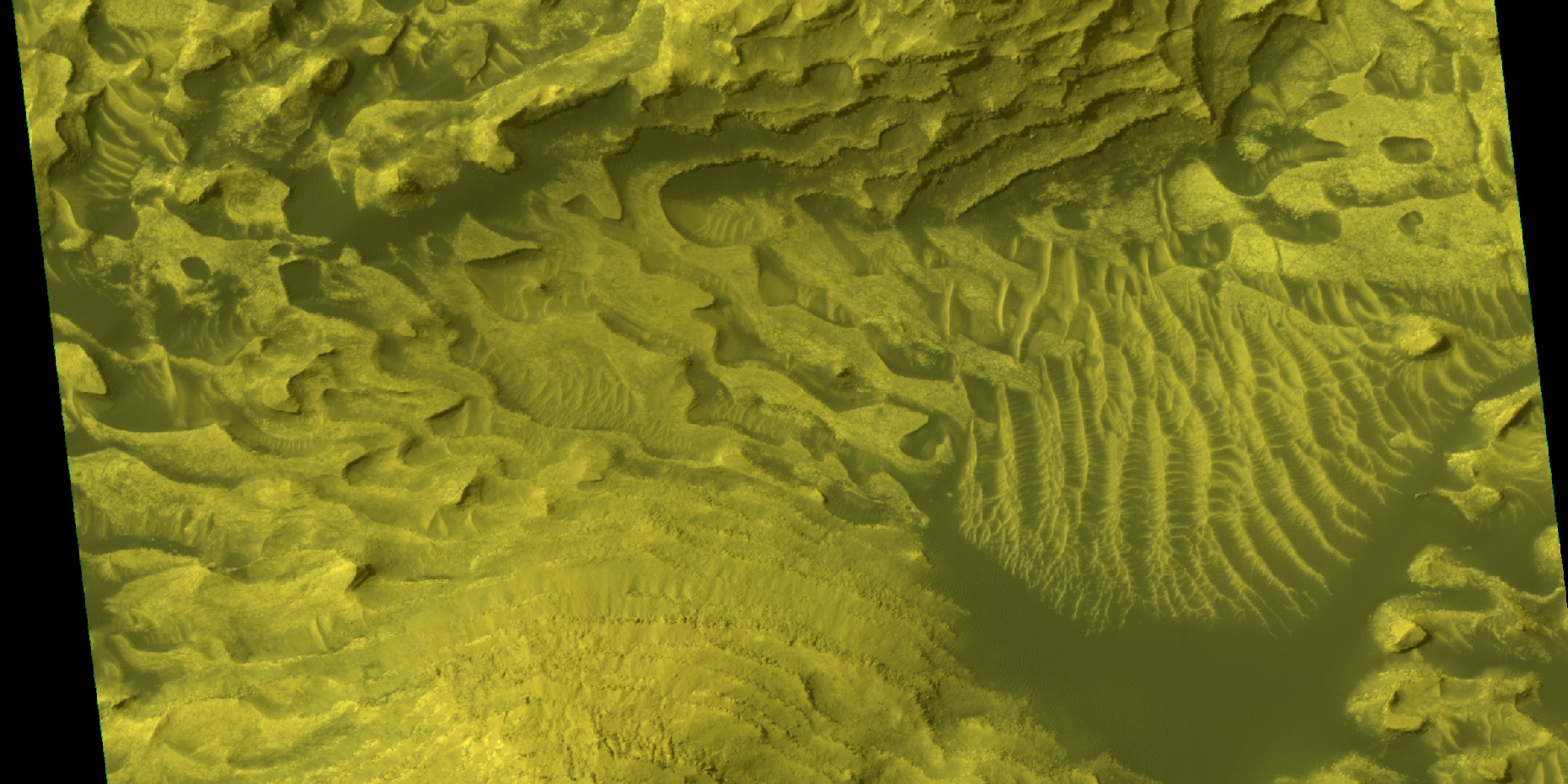
Color close up of layers in Danielson crater, as seen by HiRISE

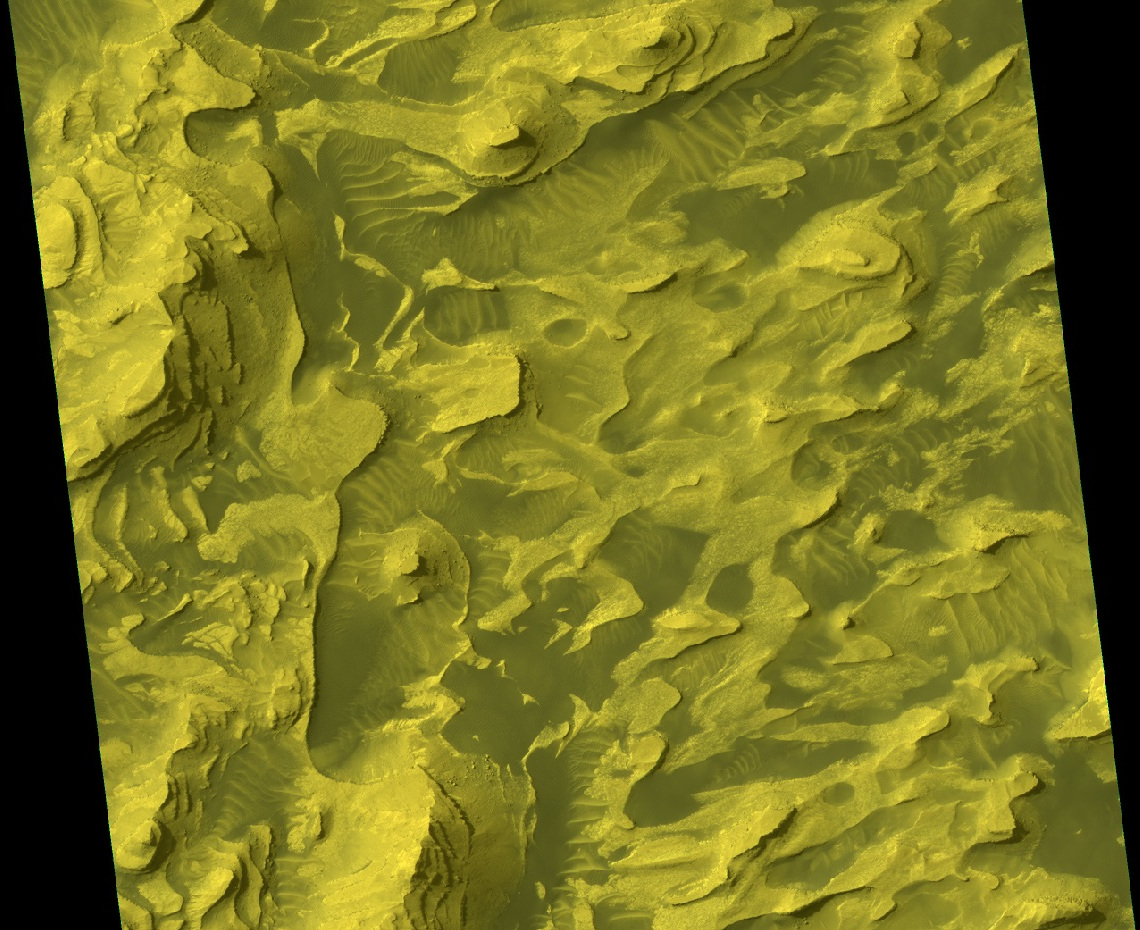
Layers and buttes, as seen by HiRISE

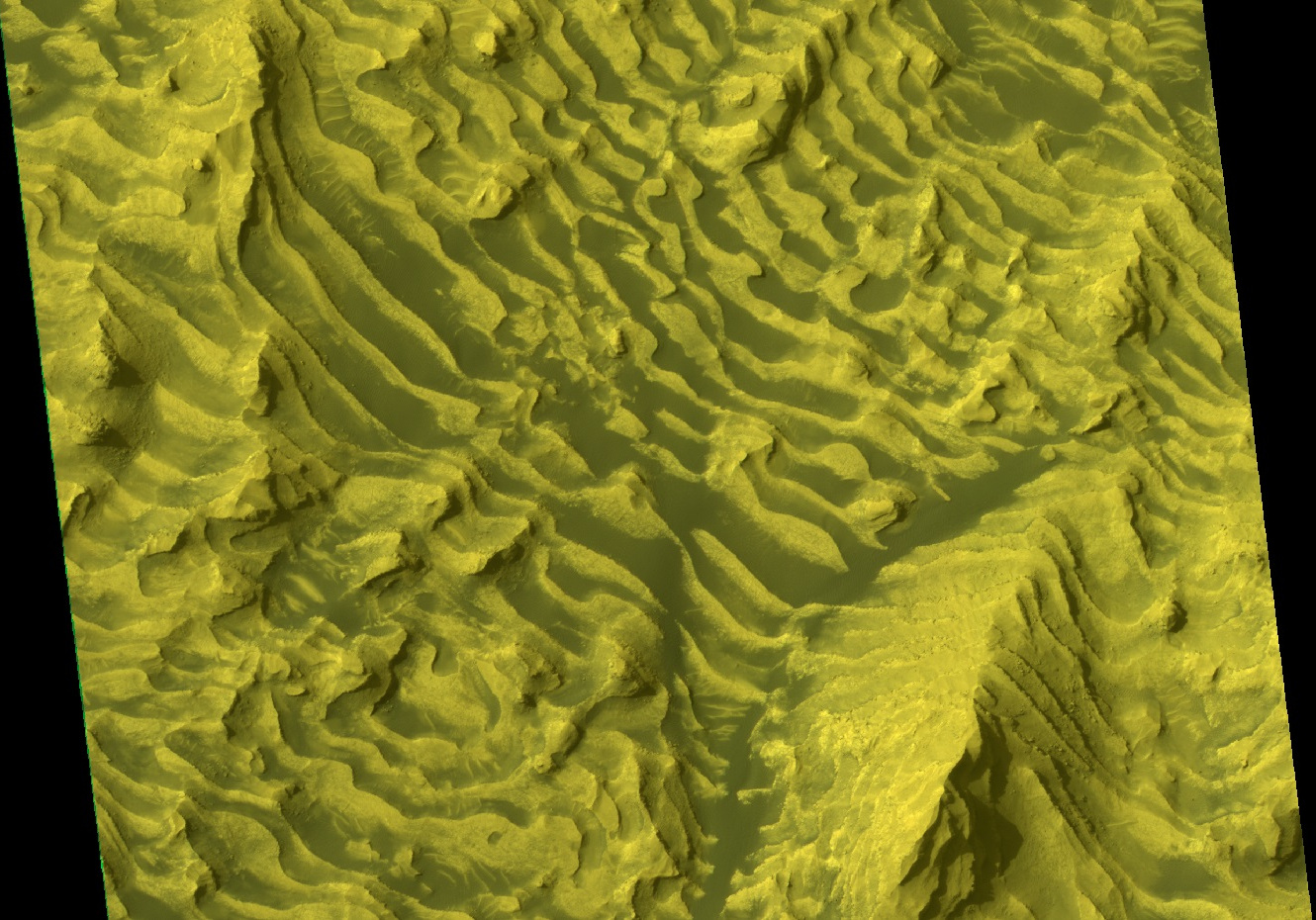
Color close up of layers, as seen by HiRISE
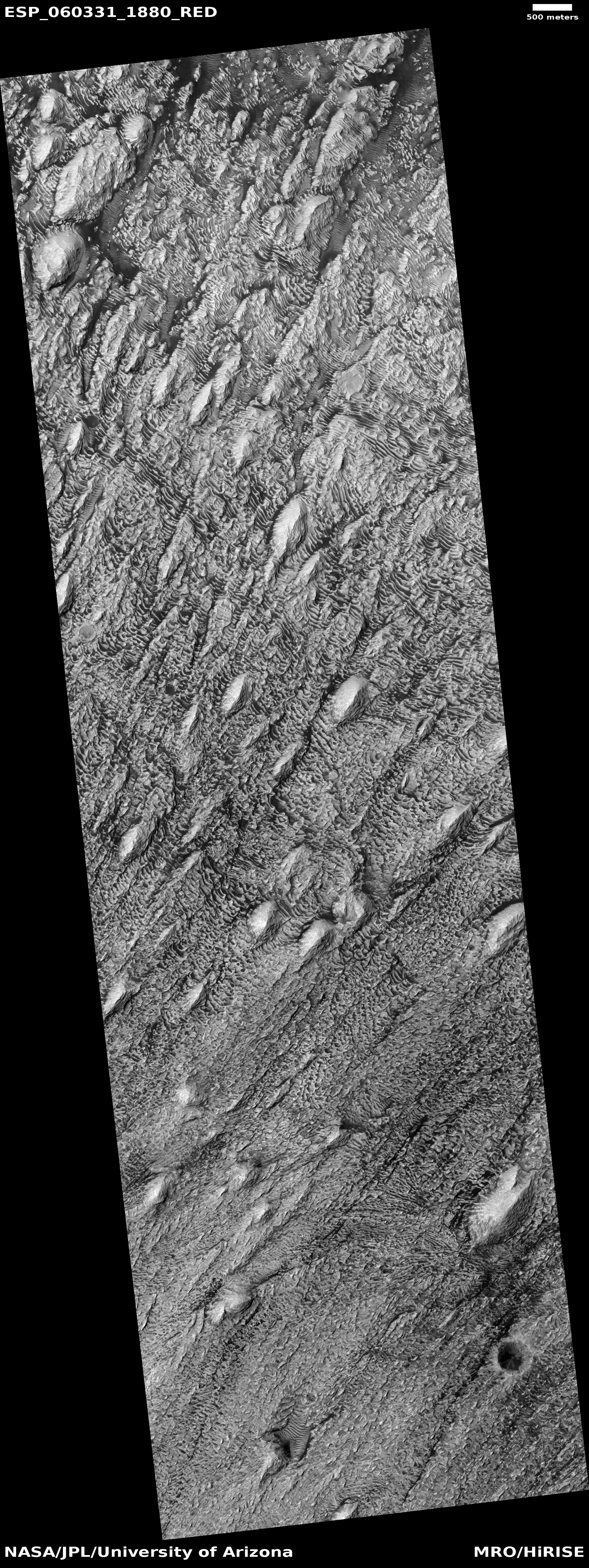
Wide view of layers in Danielson crater, as seen by HiRISE

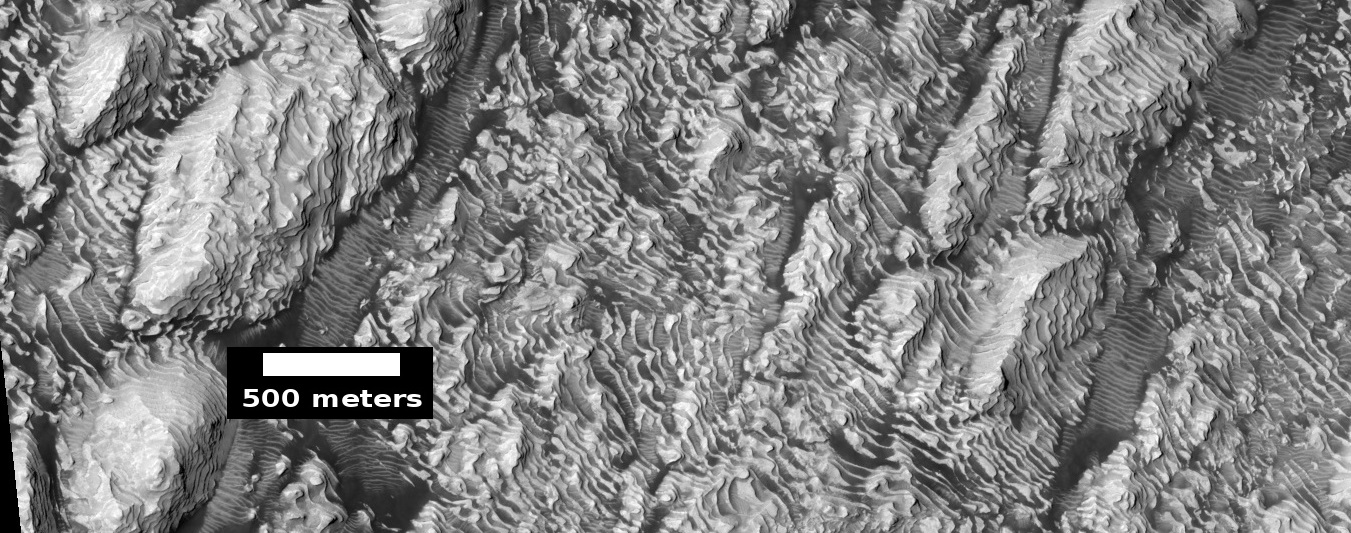
Layers, as seen by HiRISE

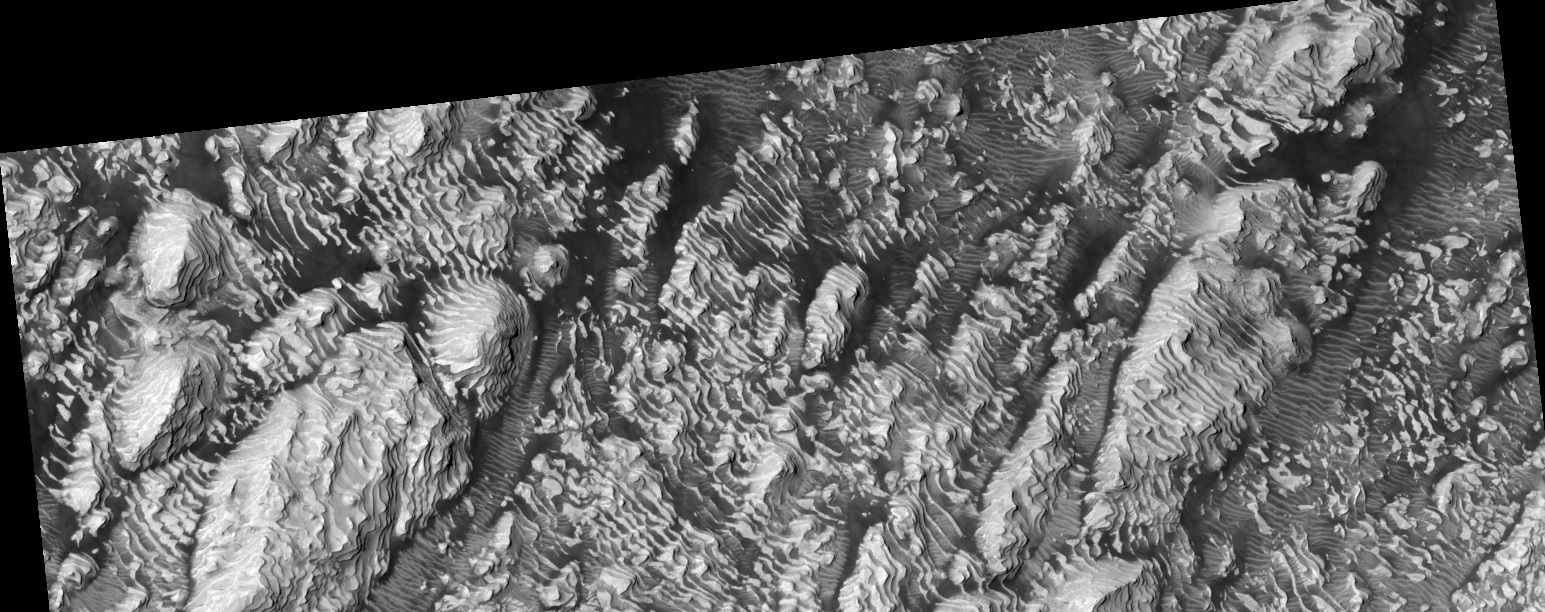
Layers and dark dust, as seen by HiRISE

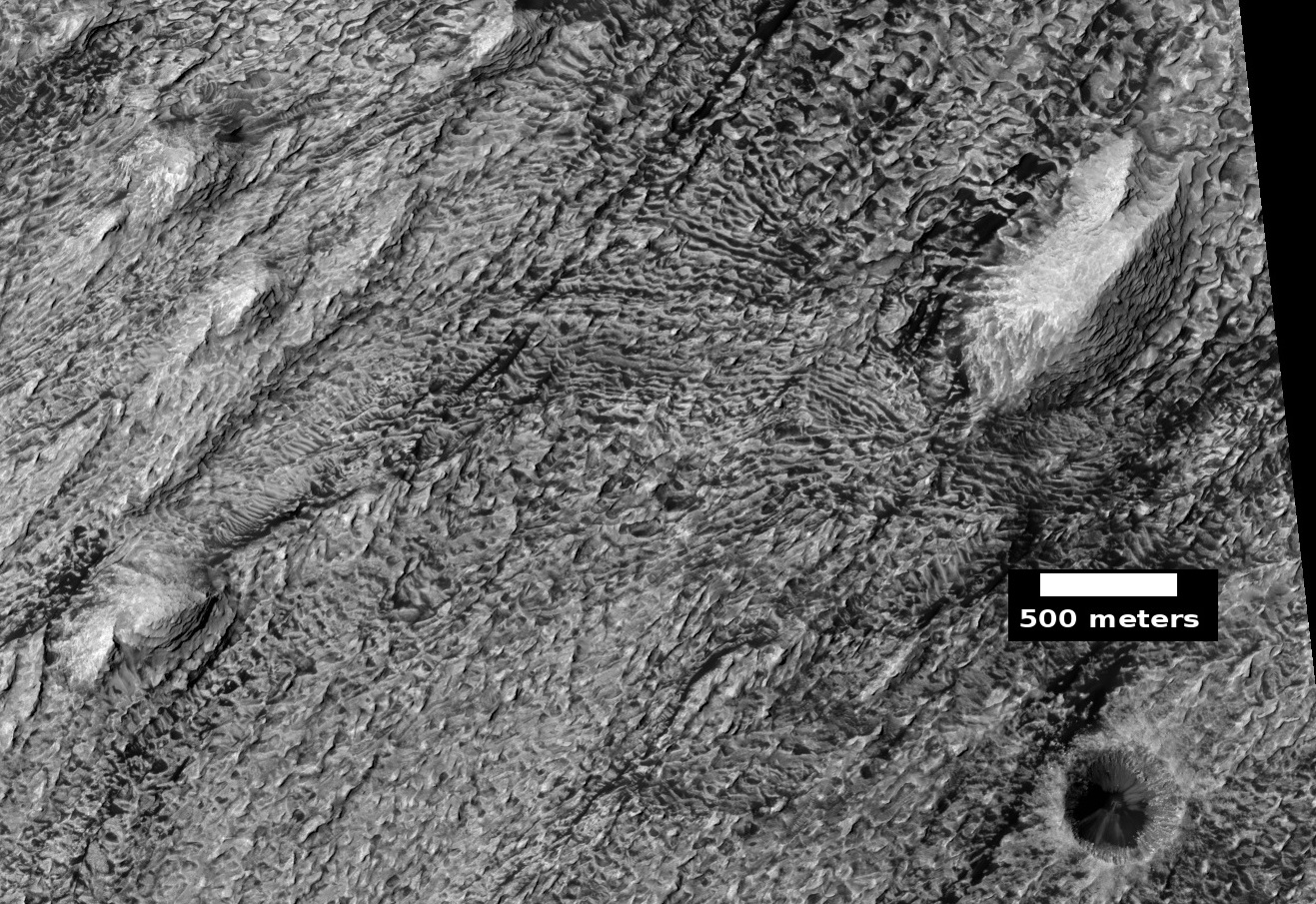
Layers, crater, and mounds on floor of Danielson, as seen by HiRISE

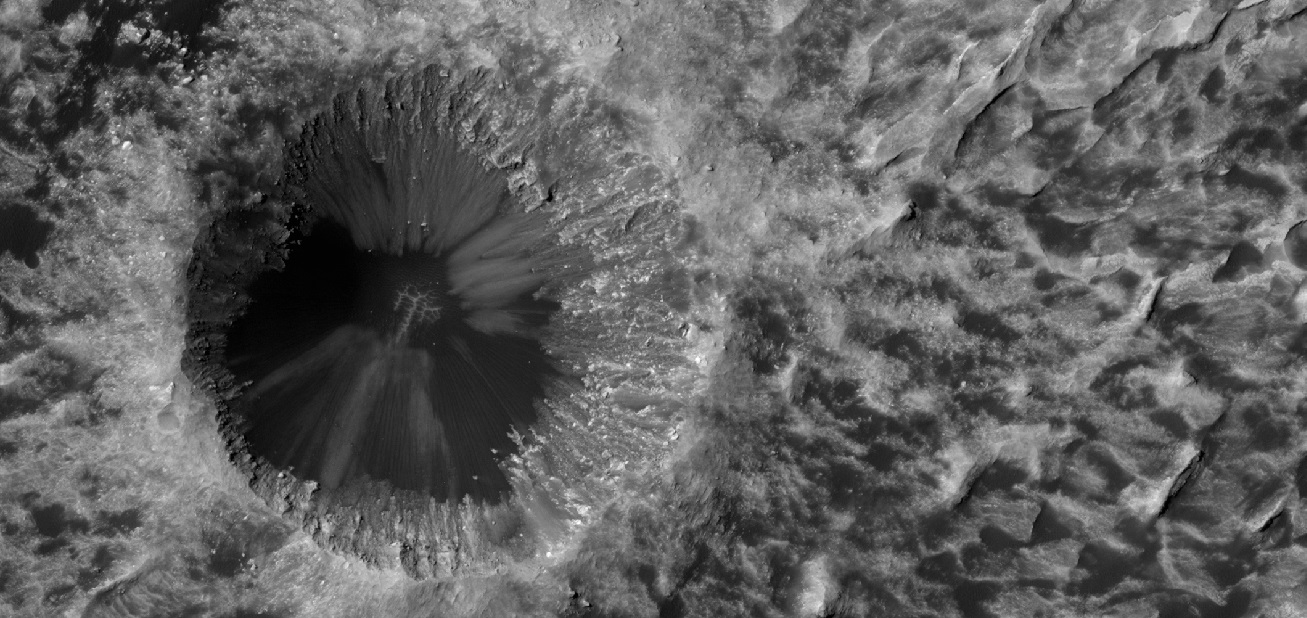
Close view of crater on floor of Danielson, as seen by HiRISE

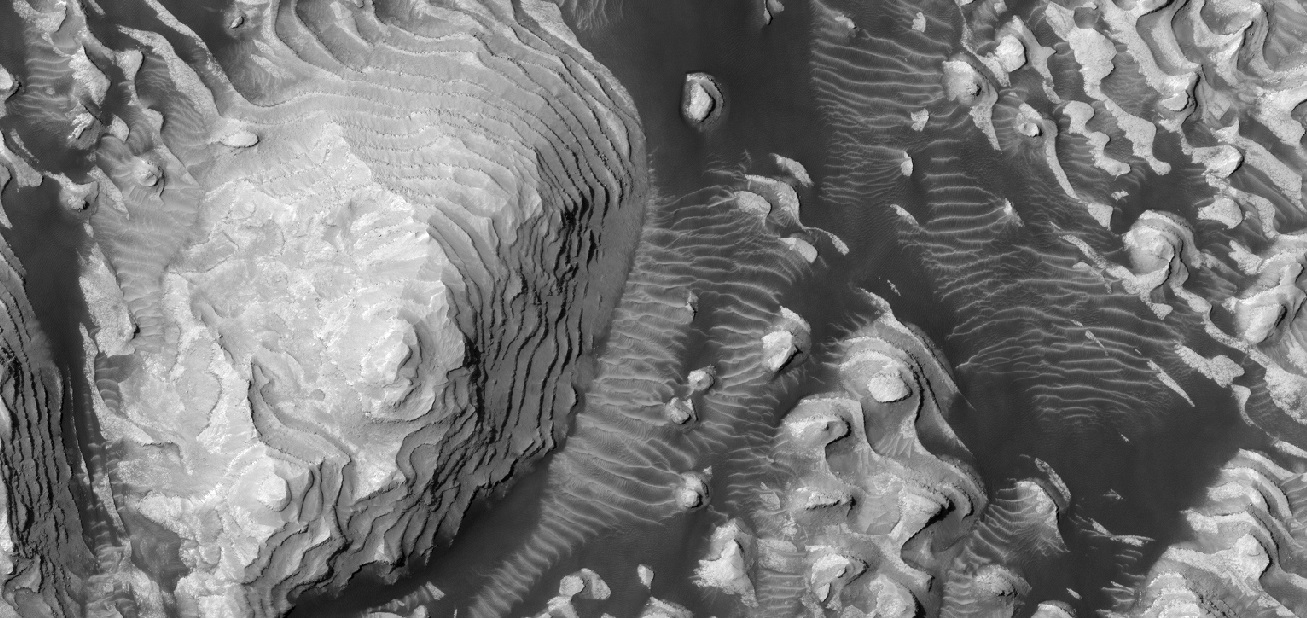
Layered mound on floor, as seen by HiRISE

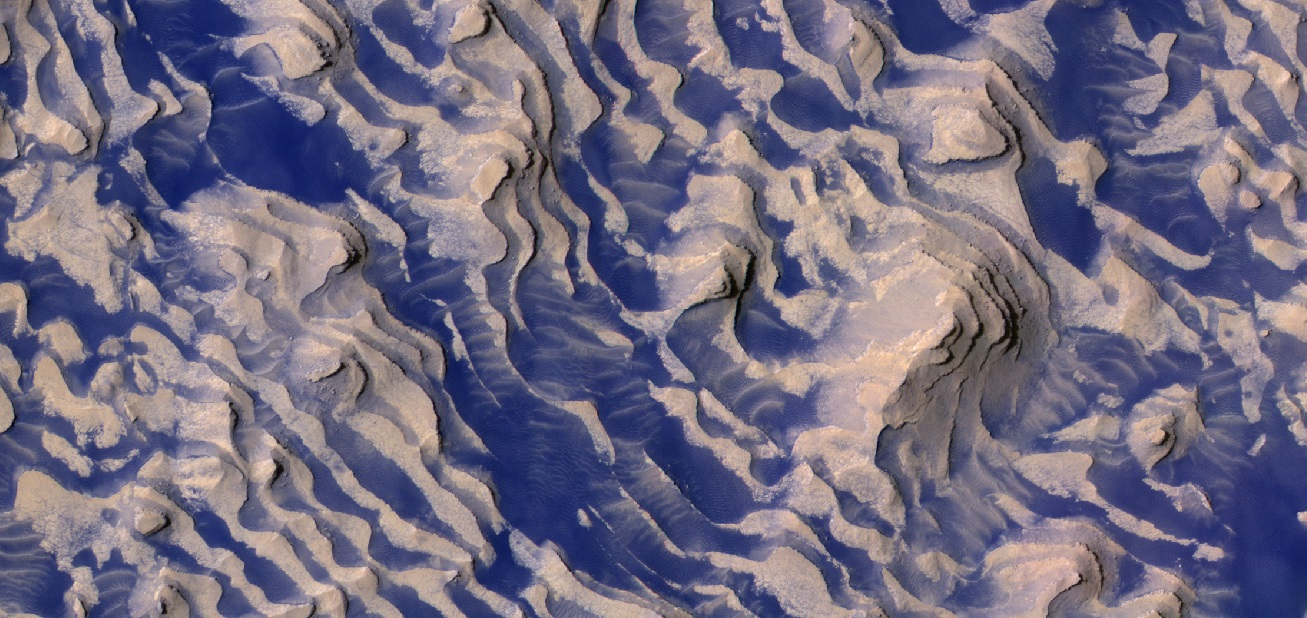
Close, color view of layers and dark dust on floor, as seen by HiRISE

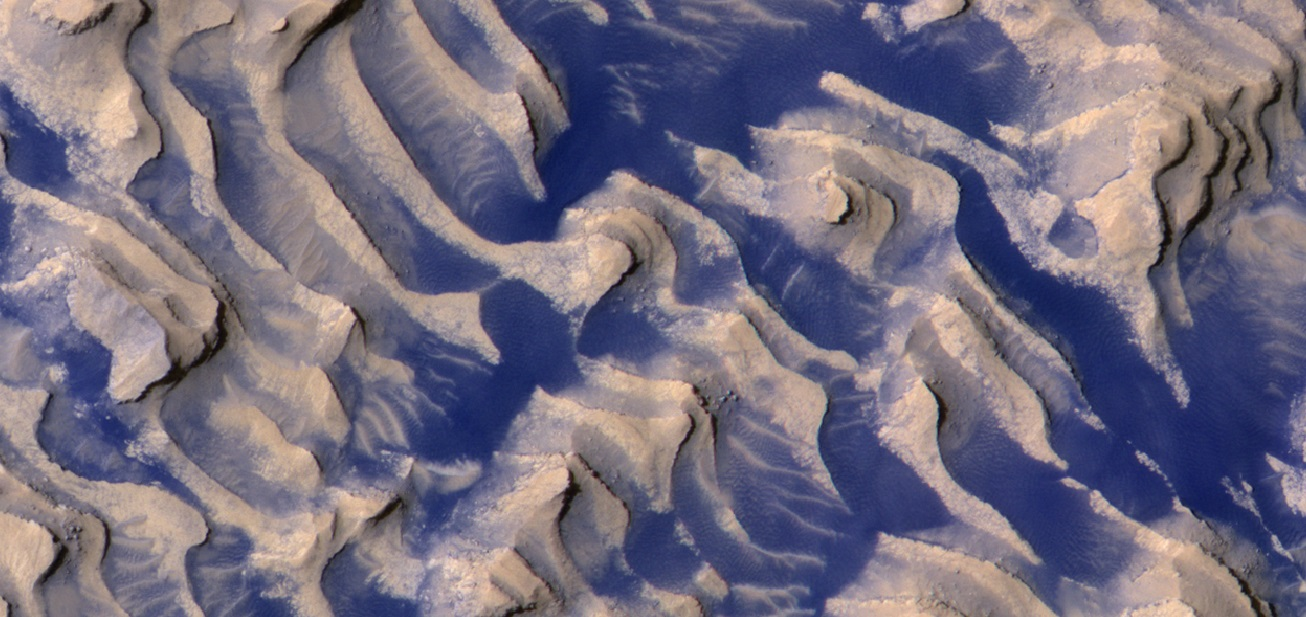
Close, color view of layers and dark dust on floor, as seen by HiRISE. Boulders are visible in the image.

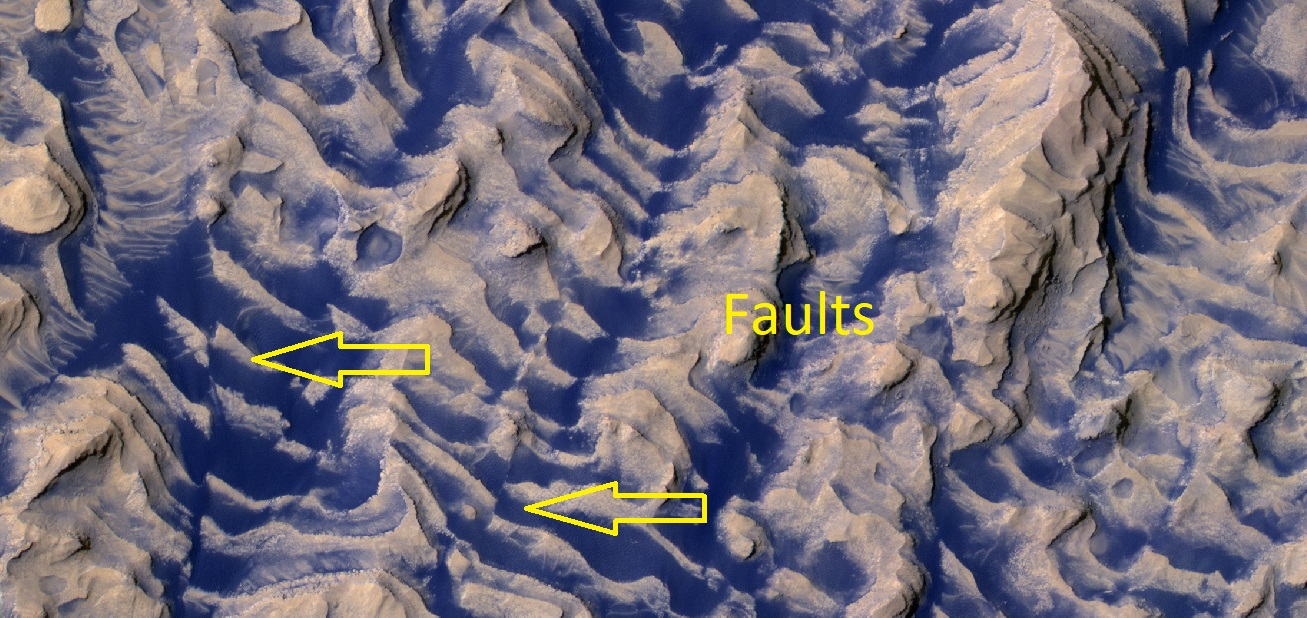
Close, color view of layers and dark dust on floor, as seen by HiRISE. Faults are indicated with arrows.

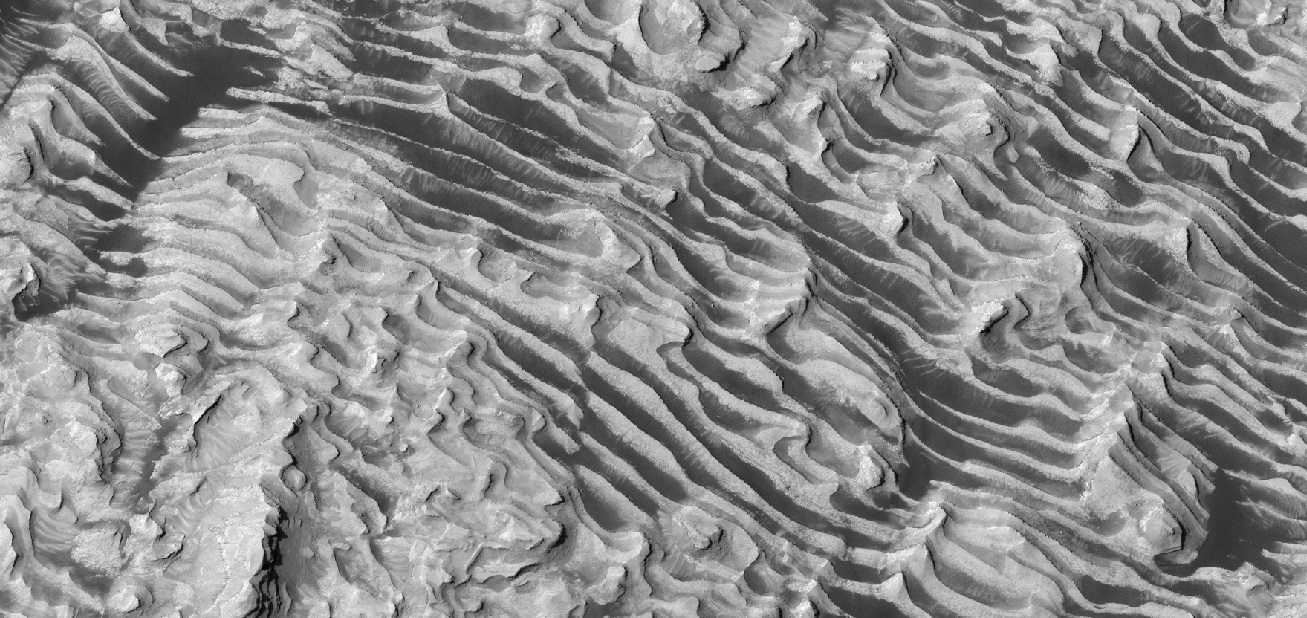
Close view of layers on floor, as seen by HiRISE. Some faults are visible in image.

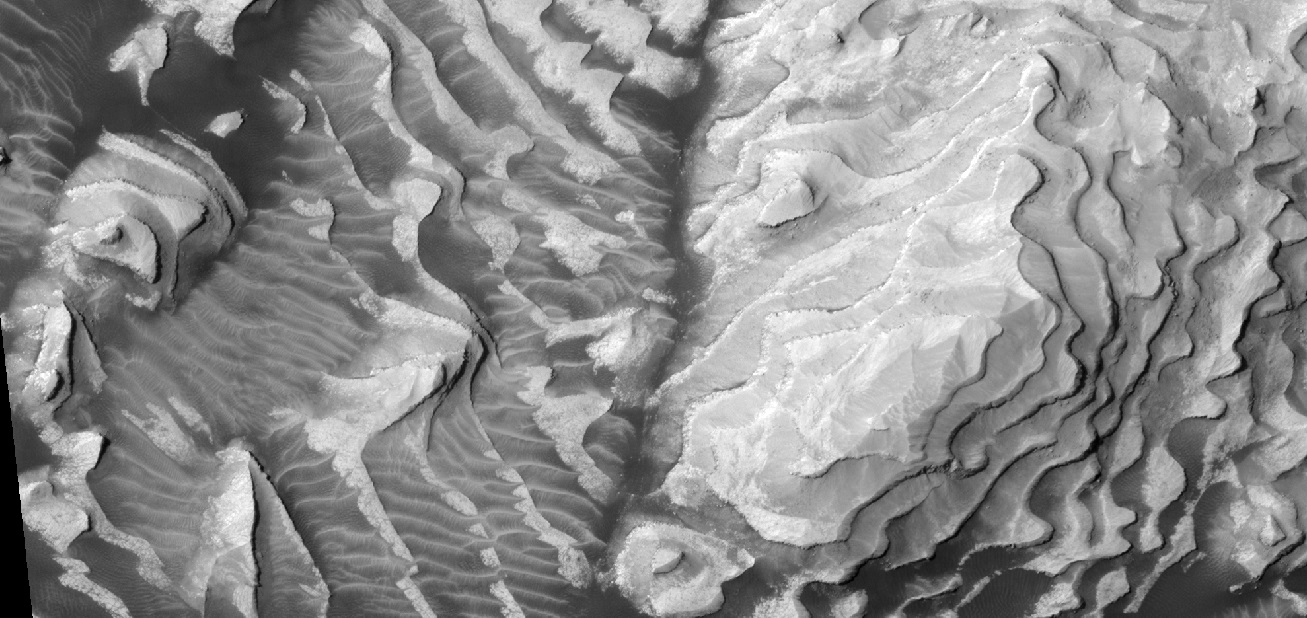
Close, color view of layers and dark dust on floor, as seen by HiRISE. Some small faults are visible in image.

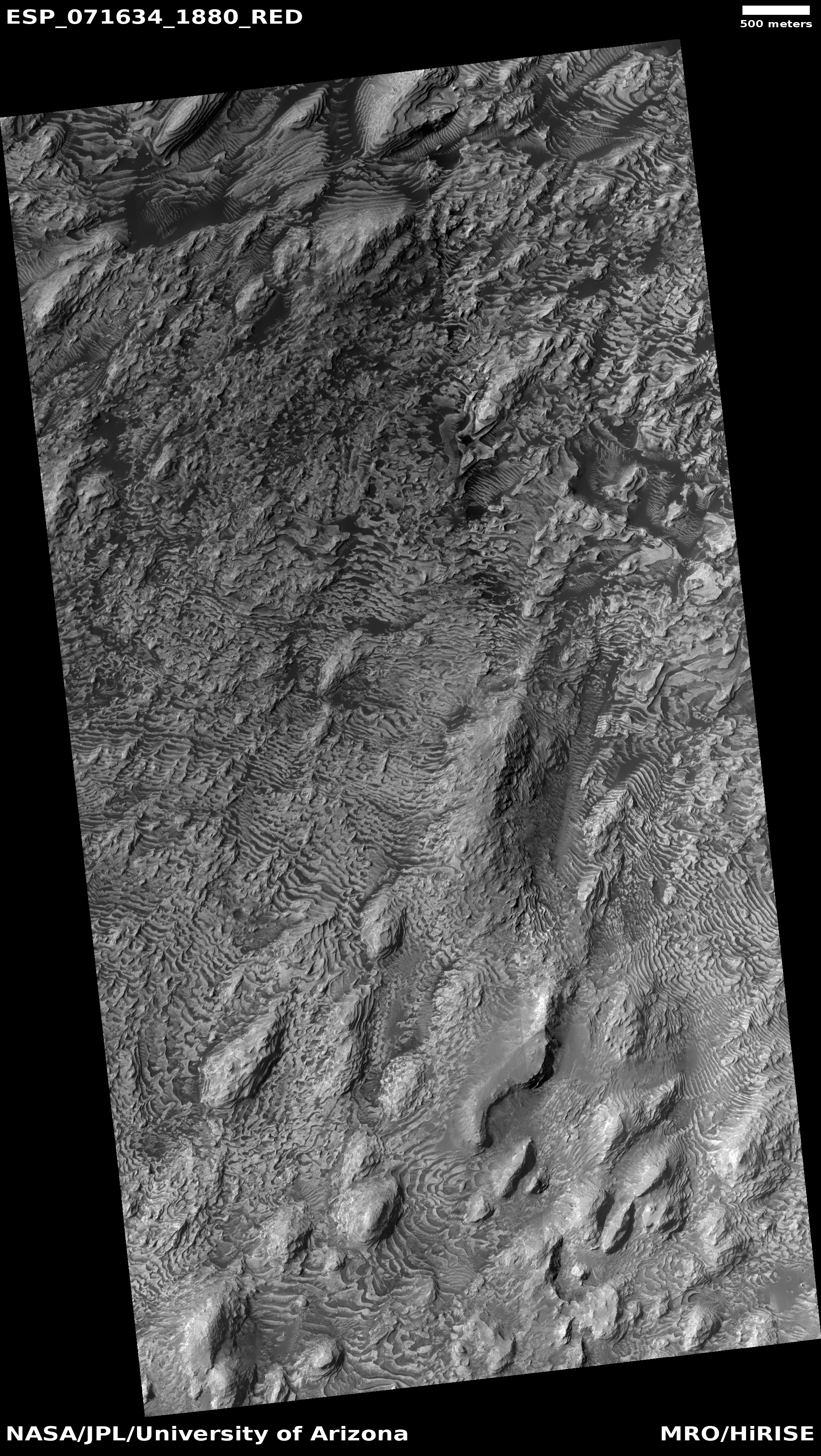
Wide view of layers in Danielson Crater, as seen by HiRISE under HiWish program. Image was named HiRISE picture of the day.

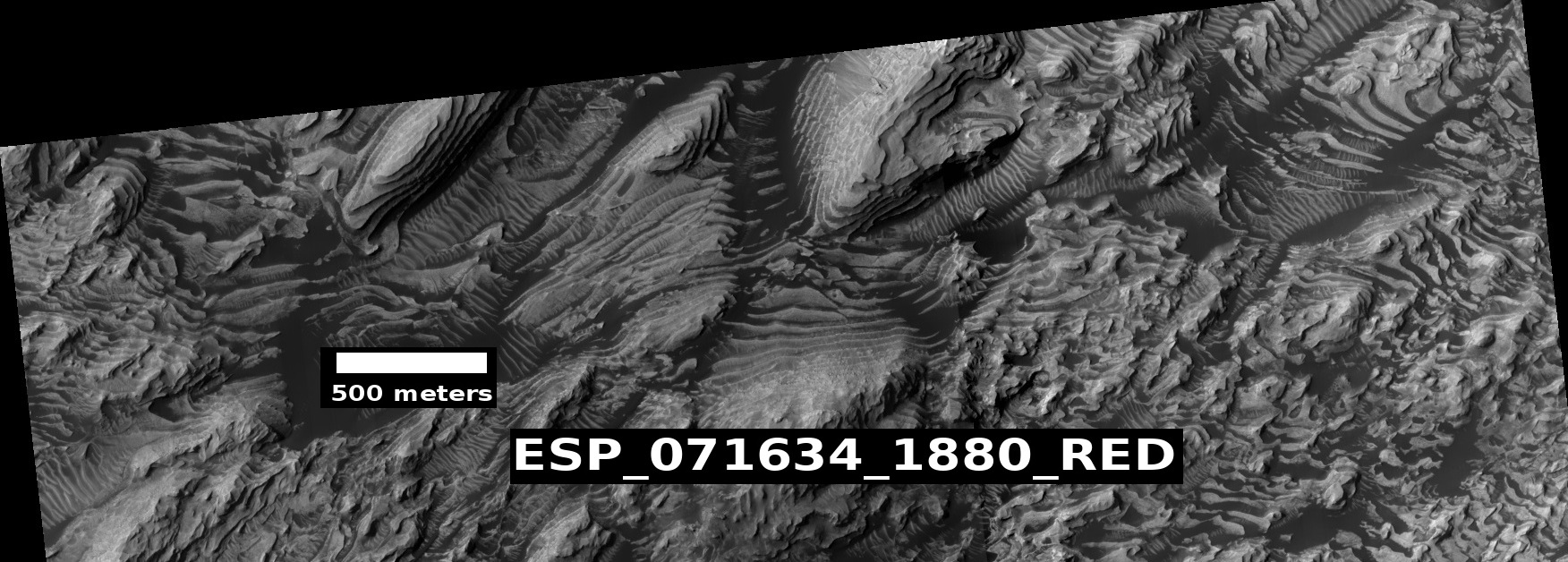
Close view of top of image of Danielson Crater, as seen by HiRISE (ESP_071634_1880).

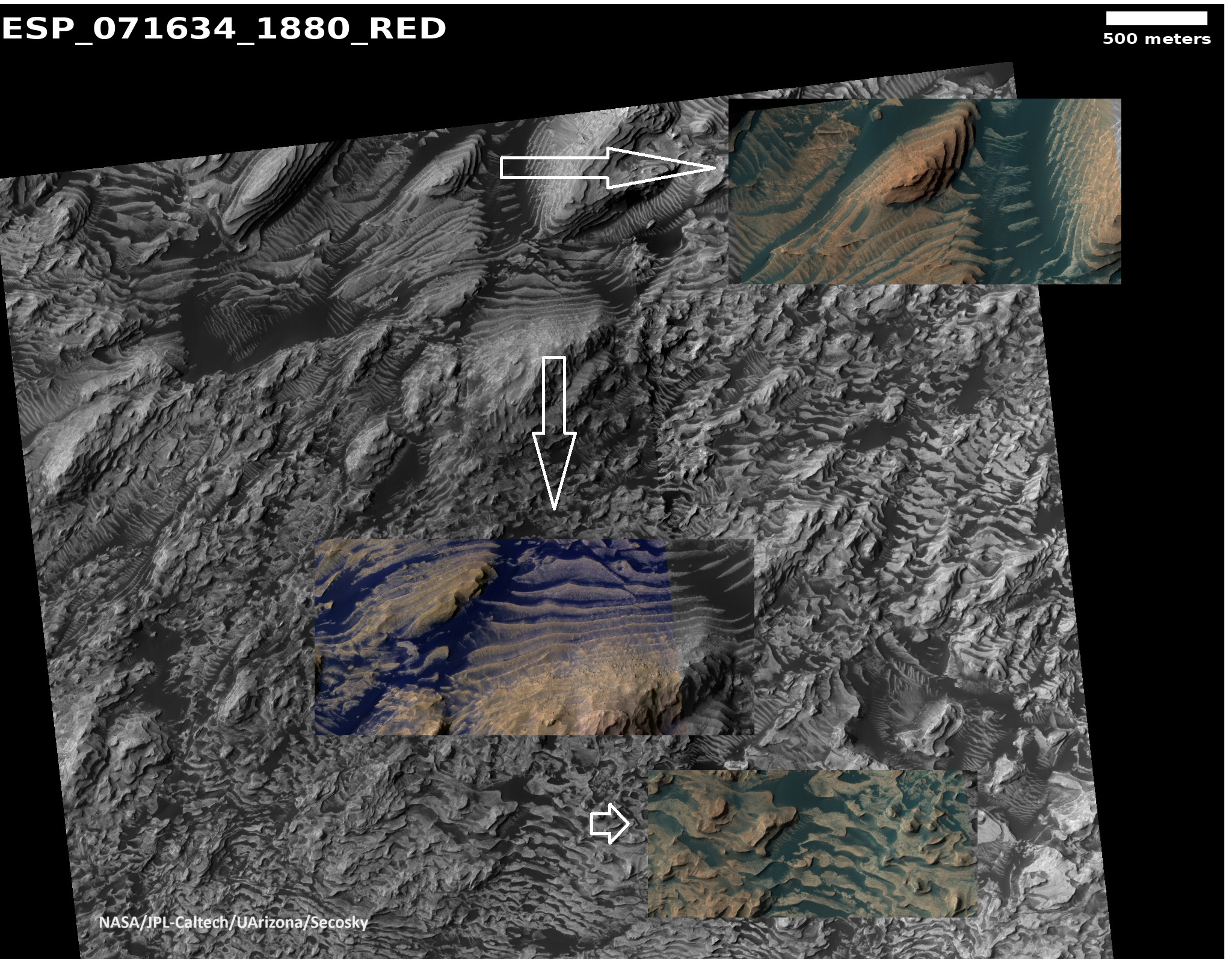
Close view of top of image of Danielson. Arrows indicate parts that are enlarged.

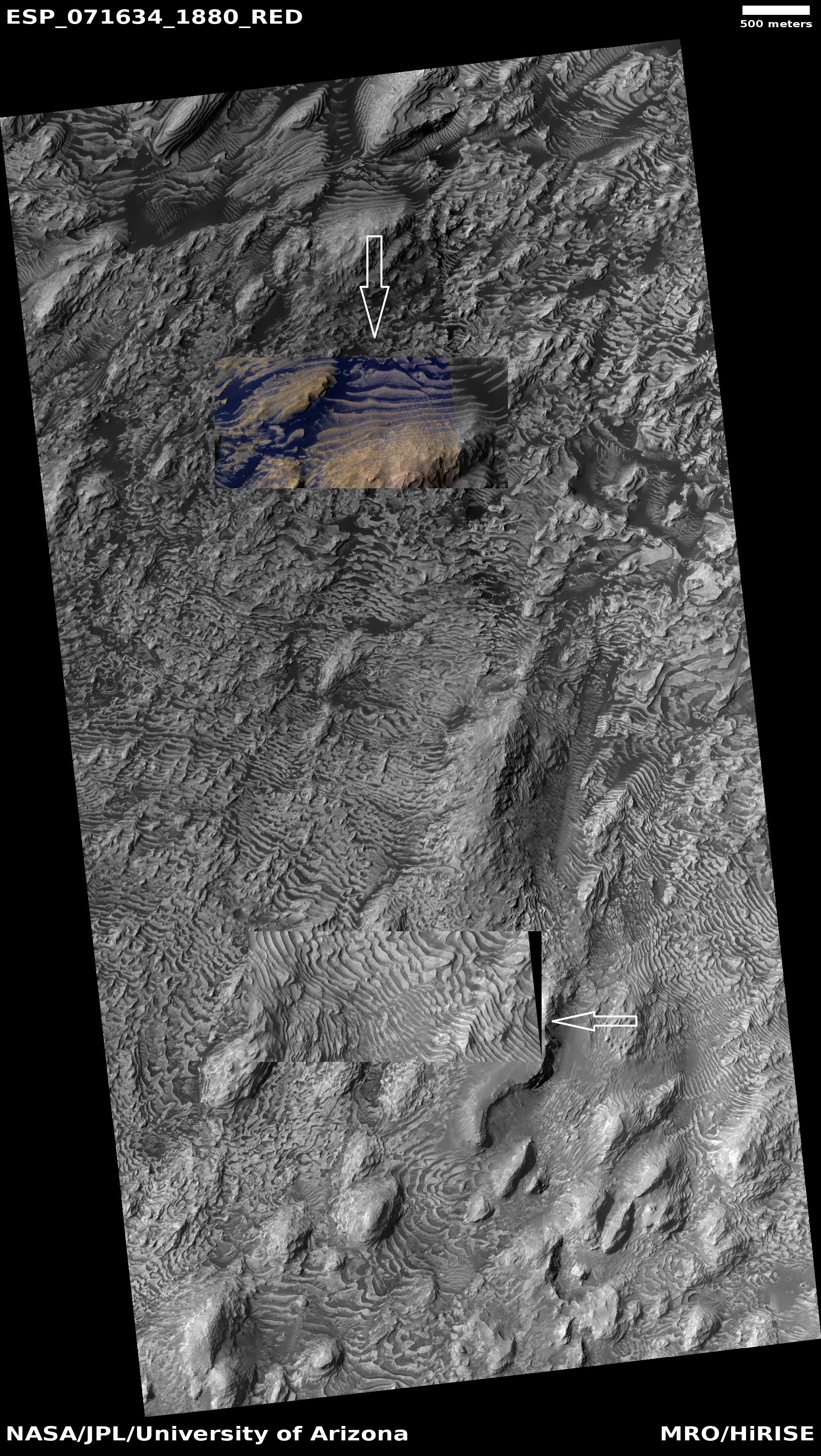
Layers in Danielson Crater with enlargements of some spots (indicated with arrows).

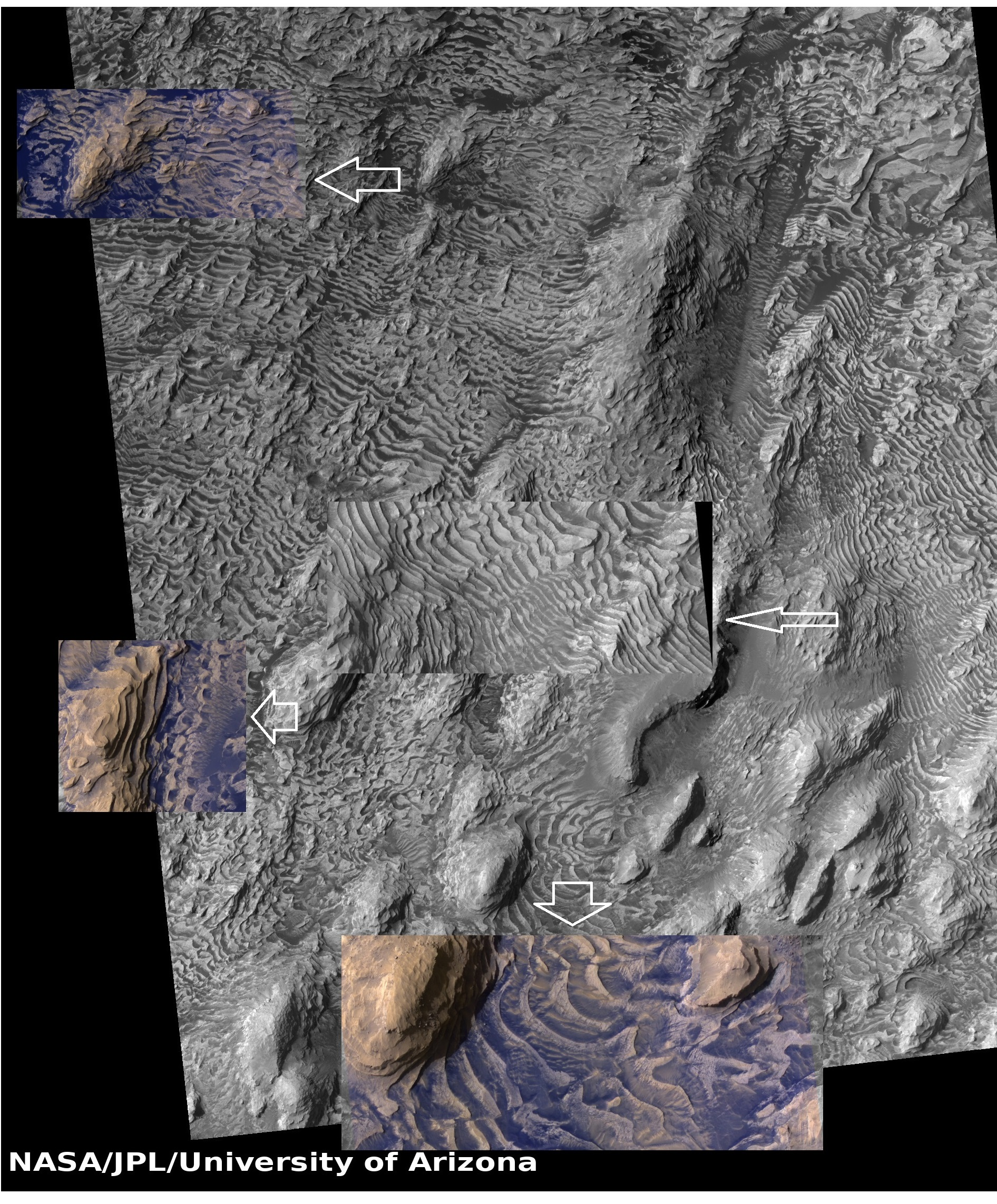
Layers in Danielson Crater with enlargements of some spots (indicated with arrows).

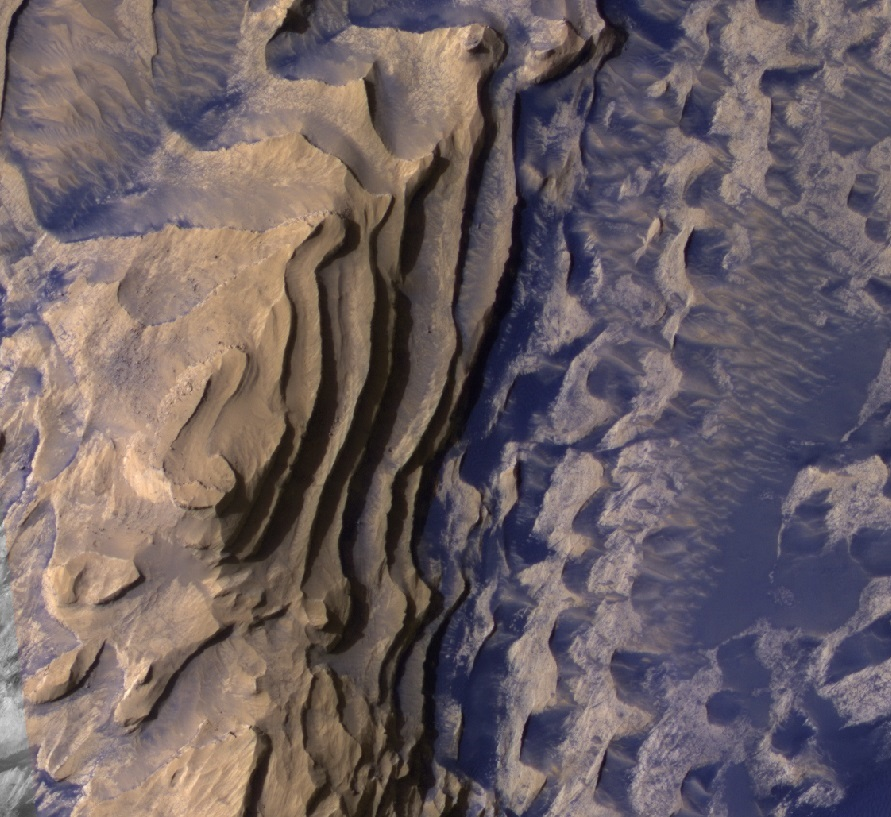
Layers in Danielson Crater, as seen by HiRISE under HiWish program.

== See also ==
- List of craters on Mars
