= Peter A. Danielson =

Philosopher and professor (born 1946)

Peter A. Danielson (born 1946) is a philosopher and Emeritus Mary and Maurice Young Professor of Applied Ethics at the University of British Columbia.

== Education and career ==
Danielson received his BA in philosophy from University of Michigan and his PhD from the University of Toronto. His PhD supervisor was David Gauthier. Danielson taught at York University during the 1970s and 1980s. In 1995 he joined the philosophy department and Centre for Applied Ethics at the University of British Columbia. In 2001 he became the Mary and Maurice Young Professor of Applied Ethics, and then Director of UBC's Centre for Applied Ethics in 2002. In 2016 he retired to emeritus status, but is still active in teaching and research.

== Publications ==
=== Books ===
- Artificial Morality: Virtuous Robots for Virtual Games London: Routledge, 1992 ISBN 9780415076913
