= Mia Danielsson =

Swedish politician (born 1980)

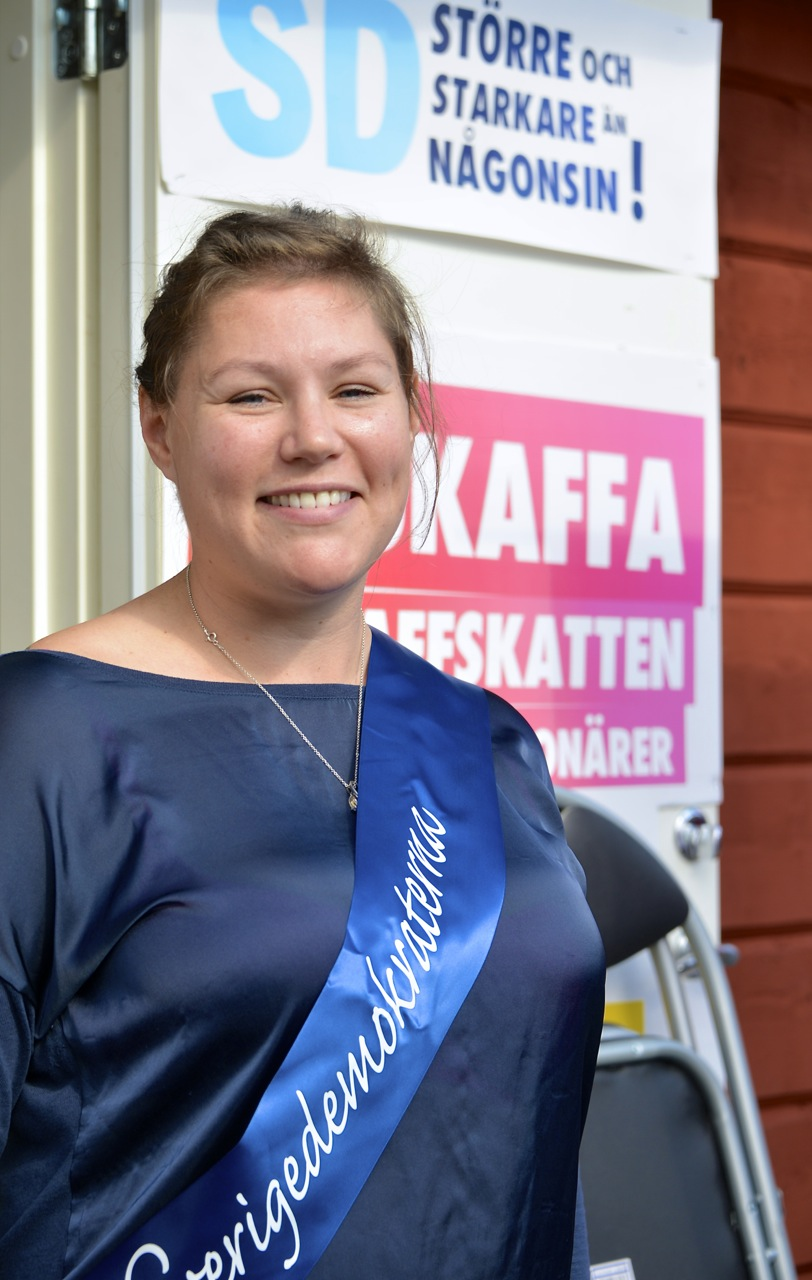
- Mia Danielsson in September 2014.

Personal details
- Born: 2 January 1980 (age 46)
- Party: Sweden Democrats

Maria Charlotte Danielsson (born 2 January 1980) is a Swedish politician for the Sweden Democrats; she is a chairman at the Stockholm Municipality and group leader for the party since 2014, and from September 2014 to September 2015 she was lead chairman for SD in Stockholm.

She resigned from her post in November 2015. Danielsson studied at the University of California, UCLA between 1999 and 2005. She graduated with degrees in American literature and international state science. She is the author of the book Rädda baby thor which was published in 2013.
