= Arnbjørn Danielsen =

Faroese footballer (born 1973)

Personal information
- Date of birth: 14 October 1973 (age 53)
- Position: Defender

Senior career*
Years	Team	Apps	(Gls)
1993–1996	B68 Toftir		
1997–1999	B36 Tórshavn		
2000	B68 Toftir		
2001–2004	B36 Tórshavn		
2005–2008	B68 Toftir		

International career
1997–2004	Faroe Islands	8	(0)
- * Club domestic league appearances and goals

Arnbjørn Danielsen (born 14 October 1973) is a Faroese retired football defender.
