= Robert Danielsen =

Norwegian footballer (1905–1973)

Personal information
- Date of birth: 22 July 1903
- Place of birth: Fredrikstad, Norway
- Date of death: 13 April 1973 (aged 69)
- Position: Forward

International career
Years	Team	Apps	(Gls)
1928	Norway	1	(0)

Robert Danielsen (22 July 1905 – 13 April 1973) was a Norwegian footballer. He played in one match for the Norway national football team in 1928.
