= Rebekka Danielsen =

Faroese footballer (born 2000)

Personal information
- Full name: Rebekka Eschen Danielsen
- Date of birth: 10 March 2000 (age 26)
- Position: Defender

Team information
- Current team: Hinna
- Number: 6

Youth career
- 2012–2016: Forus og Gausel

Senior career*
Years	Team	Apps	(Gls)
2015–2018	Forus og Gausel	7	(4)
2018–	Hinna	10	(2)

International career^{‡}
2016	Faroe Islands U17	3	(0)
2017–	Faroe Islands U19	5	(0)
2018–	Faroe Islands	1	(0)
- * Club domestic league appearances and goals as of 3 October 2021 ‡ National team caps and goals as of 8 July 2010

Rebekka Eschen Danielsen (born 10 March 2000) is a Faroese football defender who currently plays for Hinna and the Faroe Islands women's national football team.
