= John Lawrence Donelson =

Confederate cavalry officer (1829–1864)

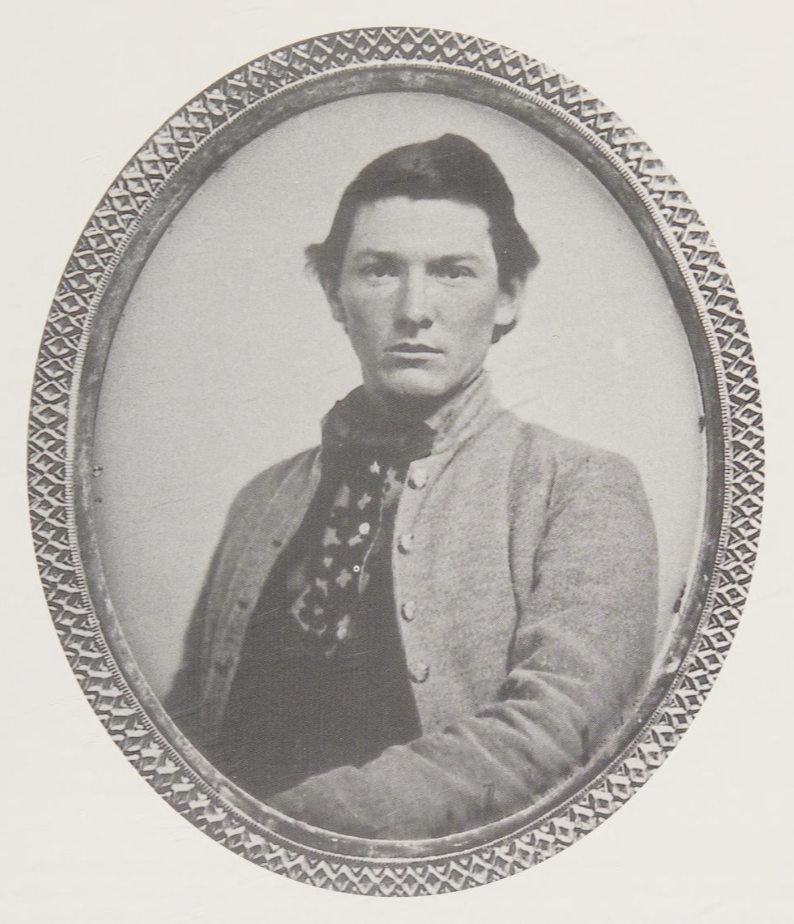
- Born: April 6, 1829; Hermitage, Tennessee, US
- Died: July 5, 1864 (aged 35); San Antonio, Texas
- Burial place: San Antonio City Cemetery No. 1
- Military career
- Allegiance: Confederate States
- Branch: Confederate States Army
- Rank: Major
- Battles: American Civil War

John Lawrence Donelson (1829–1864) was a Confederate cavalry officer in the American Civil War.

== Life ==
John Lawrence Donelson, son of Stockley Donelson and Phila Ann Donelson (née Lawrence), was born into a distinguished family in Hermitage, Davidson County, Tennessee, on April 6, 1829. By 1860 he was living in Echo, Live Oak County, Texas as a stock raiser.

At the outset of the Civil War, he enlisted in the 2nd Texas Mounted Rifles. He died of consumption in San Antonio.

== See also ==
- 2nd Texas Cavalry Regiment

== Sources ==
- Niemeyer, Stephanie P.; Derbes, Brett J. (April 5, 2011). "Donelson, John Lawrence (1829–1864)". Handbook of Texas Online. Texas State Historical Association.
