= Christian Danielsson =

Swedish photographer

Christian Danielsson aka Chris Daniels, is a photographer born 1966 in Sweden. Chris started his career early with freelance assignments for local papers and learned photography from the masters surrounding him in Sweden. The small township of Ystad where he grew up has produced a range of other artists: Karin Glenmark (singer, (Chess)), Anders Glenmark (songwriter and producer), Bosse Lasson (portrait photographer), PA Jörgensen (food & chef photographer), Ernst-Hugo Järegård (actor), Lycke Li (singer-songwriter), Michael Saxell (songwriter, artist and producer). Ystad is also the place where the Wallander TV series and movies are produced.

Chris soon developed his own style in “street photography” inspired by Christer Strömholm, Anders Petersen and Walther Hirsch. Before the age of 20 he was granted a full membership (and being recognised as a master photographer) in the prestigious Swedish Photographers Association. He has served as a judge for many photo competitions and has also won several awards for his images of people. In Sweden Chris was also a regular lecturer.

Together with colleague and editor Urban Thoms, they did a series of articles regarding bad conditions in the wealthy Swedish society in the late 1980s. The stories and photos attracted much attention and the society were forced into making significant changes. 1) 2):

- Addictive to gambling: Several articles exposed and pointed out the nature of the gambling hell. Soon it was recognised as a state of illness by Swedish authorities who made billions out of gambling.
- Exposing child/teenage prostitution in Stockholm
- Documenting the work of the Salvation Army with the homeless and revealing the homeless situation in Stockholm
- Misconducts of refugees in Swedish police arrests

After the photojournalism years in the 1980s and early 1990s Chris moved into commercial and advertising photography, mostly architectural and property photography. Chris images have been published in papers, magazines and books all over the world. Since 2008 Chris lives and work as a photographer and web designer in New Zealand.
