= Robards–Donelson–Jackson relationship controversy =

American social-political scandal

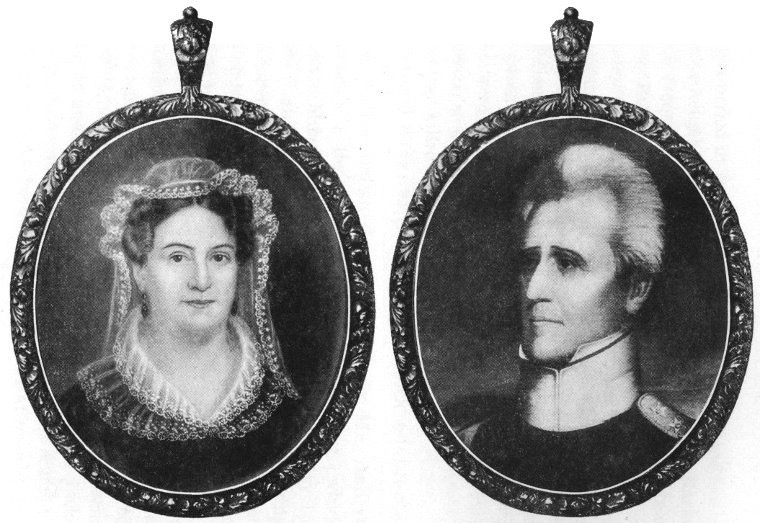
Miniatures of Rachel and Andrew Jackson

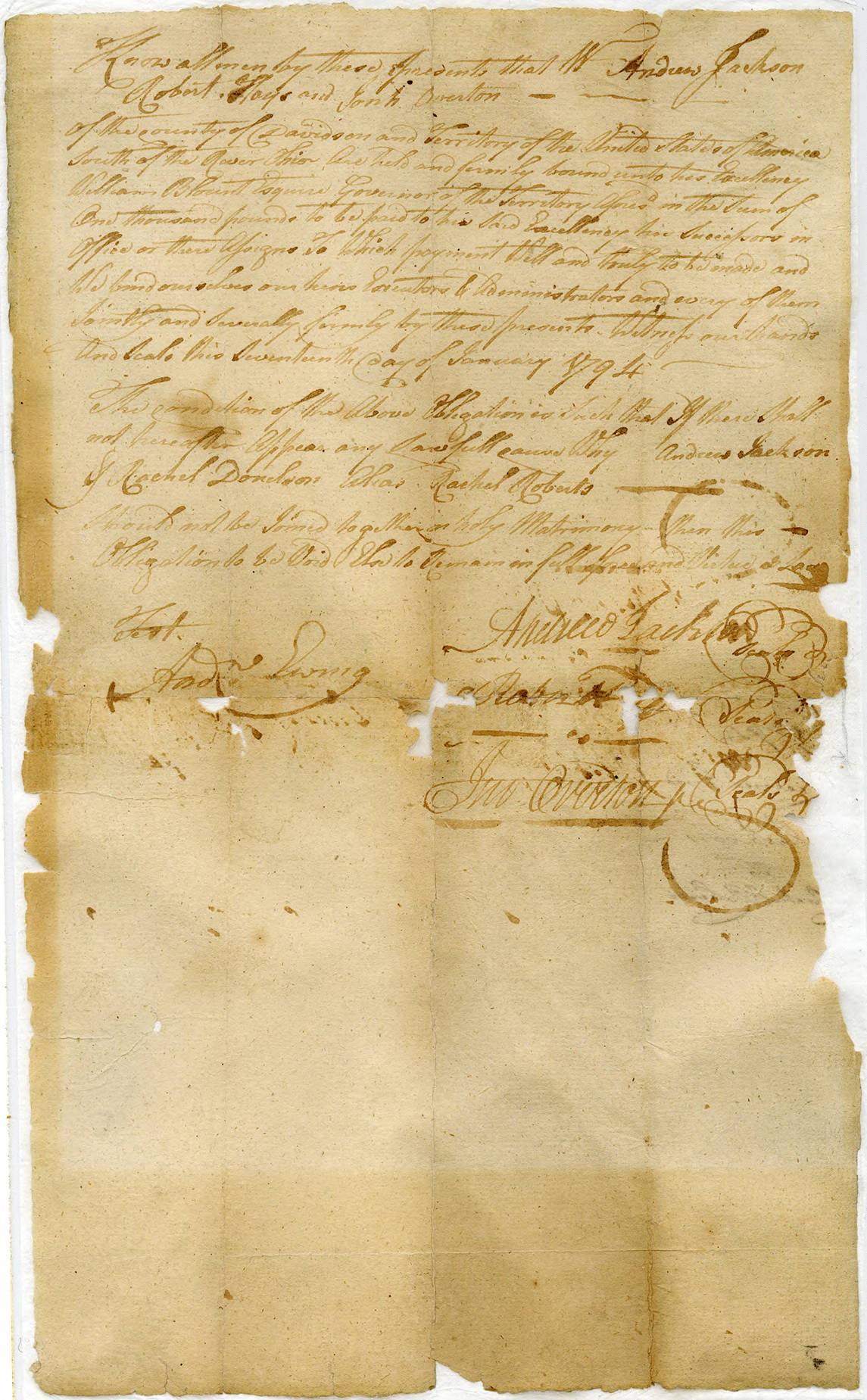
Marriage bond of Andrew Jackson and Rachel Donelson Robards, signed by Andrew Jackson, his bondsmen Robert Hays and John Overton, witnessed by Andrew Ewing, January 17, 1794

The Robards–Donelson–Jackson relationship controversy was a long-running frontier sex scandal that began in the 1790s in what was then the far west of the newly established United States of America. The parties were Lewis Robards of Kentucky and his young wife, Rachel Donelson, daughter of Tennessee pioneer settler John Donelson. After several years of childless and apparently unhappy marriage to Robards, Rachel left him and went to the Natchez District of West Florida (Spanish Mississippi) with a young lawyer from the Carolina Piedmont named Andrew Jackson, who had business in the lower Mississippi River valley, where he traded horses and slaves. Robards later filed for divorce on grounds of abandonment and adultery. Andrew Jackson and Rachel eventually settled in the Nashville area and after the Robards-Donelson divorce was finalized, they were legally married in 1794 and lived happily for many years at a plantation called the Hermitage.

Although the circumstances of the end of Rachel Donelson's relationship with Lewis Robards and her transition to a relationship with Andrew Jackson were publicly known before 1828, the issue was put before the voting public as a campaign issue during the vitriolic 1828 U.S. presidential election that pitted Jackson against incumbent U.S. president John Quincy Adams. Rachel was accused of bigamy and adultery, abetted by Jackson.

The Jackson campaign committee led by John Overton created and publicized an exculpatory narrative to paper over the irregular marriage that had occurred almost 40 years prior. Overton's timeline and his characterization of the three parties to the "love triangle" was carried forward by later presidential biographers; in the late 20th century historians began to reassess the evidence and charge the Jackson campaign with a less-than-honest rendering of the facts. In current historical analysis, the end of Rachel Donelson's first marriage and the beginning of the Andrew-Rachel relationship is typically framed as a purposeful series of actions intended to free young Rachel from an unhappy household headed by allegedly abusive patriarch Robards.

== A brief history of Andrew & Rachel, and Lewis ==
Lewis Robards and Rachel Donaldson (Rachel Donelson) were married in 1785 in Kentucky, in what was then the legal jurisdiction of the U.S. state of Virginia. (Kentucky would not become a separate state until 1792.) Rachel was about 18, Robards was about 27. The marriage bond was signed by Rachel's father John Donelson with Willis Green clerk of court.

Lewis Robards divorce decree charging Rachel with adultery, republished in the Anti-Jackson Expositor in 1828

Andrew Jackson did business deals with two of Rachel Donelson's brothers, Stockley Donelson and William Donelson, in the 1780s. The evidence shows that Jackson and Rachel Donelson Robards took a flatboat to Natchez together via Cumberland River to the Mississippi River, sometime between July 1789 and their return to the Cumberland plateau of middle Tennessee in July 1790. John Overton's account of the marriage mentions Rachel traveled south with a Colonel Stark; Spanish records have Stark arriving in the Natchez District in January 1790. Some sort of ritual, or something (handwaves), may have taken place in July 1790 as Robards' complaint states that "Rachel Robards did, on the — [sic] July, 1790, elope from her husband, said Lewis, with another man." Natchez resident George Cochran sent his regards to "Mrs. Jackson" in a letter of November 3, 1790. Robards filed for divorce in December 1790. The Jacksons later claimed to have been married in Natchez in 1791, but no documentary evidence of this ceremony has ever been found. Rachel was listed as Rachel Jackson in the January 1791 inventory of her father's estate. The Donelson–Robards divorce was granted on grounds of adultery in September 1793. Robards unofficially remarried, to his second wife, Hannah Winn, in December 1792, and he officially married her in November 1793. Rachel Donelson Robards and Andrew Jackson were officially married by Rachel's brother-in-law Robert Hays of Haysborough, Southwest Territory, on January 18, 1794, approximately five years after they first met, and four months after her divorce was approved. (The Southwest Territory became the U.S. state of Tennessee in 1796.)

According to all available evidence, young Andrew Jackson and Rachel Donelson were "passionately in love with each other" in their youth and remained wholeheartedly devoted to one another for the rest of their lives. Adam Rothman, a historian studying Jackson's military and diplomatic exploits of the 1810s noted, as have others before him, "...the tenderness of Andrew Jackson's letters to Rachel contrasts sharply with his harshness toward his own soldiers and, of course, his Red Stick foes." Their marital affection and warmth persisted until her death in 1828; as historian Patricia Brady put it in 2011, "They really still loved each other when he was described as being a toothless skeleton and she was a fat little dumpling."

Historians including Robert V. Remini and Ann Toplovich argue that the official Jackson version of their meeting and marriage, as presented during the U.S. presidential campaign of 1828 was, for the most part, inauthentic. Remini, Jackson's major 20th-century biographer, included a timeline in the first volume of his biographical series. The entry for Jackson–Donelson reads: "1790/1791: 'Marries' Rachel Donelson Robards," with the scare quotes strongly implying the marriage was Biblical but not legal. For roughly 150 years the party line was that Rachel was "accidentally" a bigamist, or that Jackson was the third party to adultery because they were confused about how divorce law worked in Virginia, but since the 1970s historians have generally agreed that Jackson and Rachel Donelson Robards left Tennessee together to "force" Robards to file for divorce.

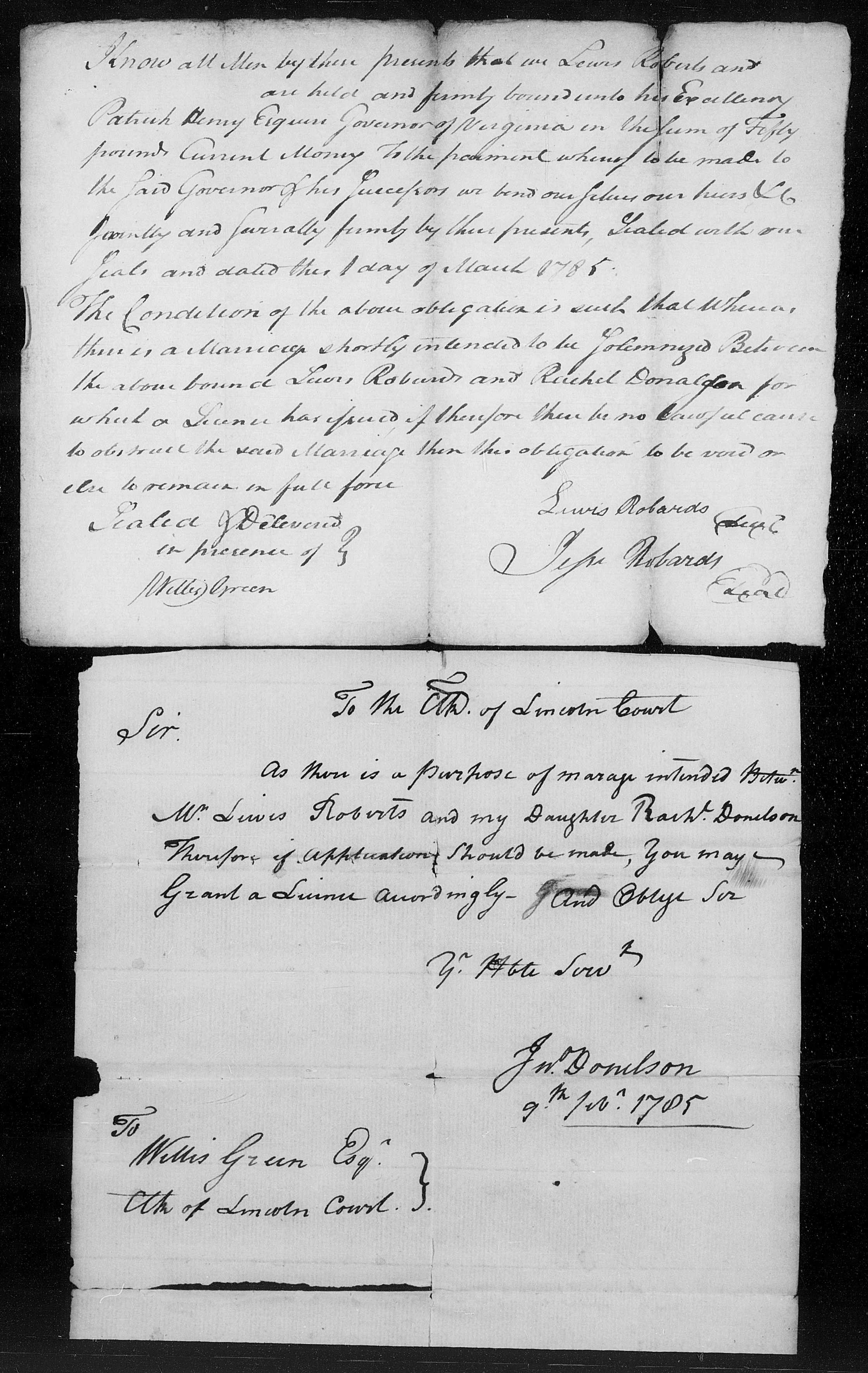
1785 marriage bond filed in state of Virginia for Lewis Robards and Rachel Donaldson (Rachel Donelson), signed by John Donelson with Willis Green clerk of court; Rachel was about 18, Robards was about 27

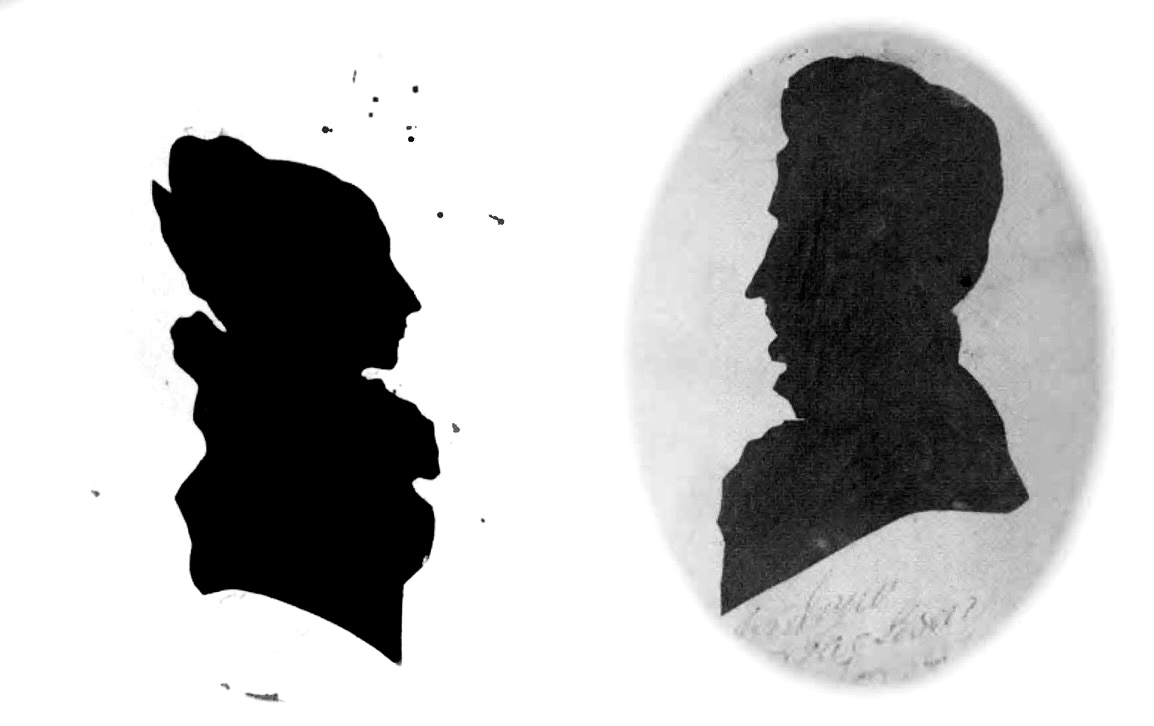
Silhouettes of Rachel Donelson Robards Jackson and Andrew Jackson, made about 1828, from The Papers of Andrew Jackson, Volume VI

Representatives of the couple later claimed they thought Robards had been granted a divorce when they were allegedly married by a friend at a friend's house, but since Jackson was a lawyer with rank roughly equivalent to a federal prosecutor today, that claim is unconvincing. According to historian Andrew Burstein, "A look-the-other-way frontier (or Scotch-Irish) bridal abduction tradition did exist" but as a man of ambition, Jackson likely determined that "the ambiguity (in Nashville) of what they were doing in Natchez made their situation less of a concern" for both his career prospects and the reputation of the Donelson family. More than likely, explains Burstein in The Passions of Andrew Jackson, the Jacksons were "willing adulterers, which sounds harsh, but in fact what they did was reasonable and expedient—and not unheard of on the frontier. The desertion and adultery approach was a well-planned stratagem for people living at such a distance from any state capital; it was the easiest (nearly the only nonviolent) justification for a formal divorce. He and Rachel needed to be named as adulterers if she was to be divorced. As prosecutor, Jackson knew the laws of the land well enough to act discreetly to secure his and Rachel's happiness." Back in 1887, presidential historian John R. Irelan was unwilling to credit Jackson with any kind of plan whatsoever: "At this date Attorney Jackson had done one other thing which was of great benefit to him, while it never ceased to be the source of most of his troubles; he had married the wife of Lewis Robards. That Jackson's skirts were entirely clear in the circumstances which made this marriage desirable, it may not be easy to demonstrate; but that his conduct was that of a lawyer, or even of a person ordinarily considerate of consequences, it would be useless to maintain."

One of Robards' descendants, grandson William J. Robards, defended his grandfather's honor into the 20th century, as retold by the Louisville Herald in 1904:

"Andrew Jackson despoiled my grandfather's home, stole his wife and married that woman two years before a divorce had been obtained," exclaimed Mr. Robards with emphasis, "and this after receiving the hospitalities of my grandfather's home. My grandfather was one of the highly esteemed men of his time in Kentucky, and his family was one of the most prominent in the territory, equal to, if not better, than that of the woman to whom he first married."

The relationship between Jackson and Robards is the least understood aspect of the triangle.

- In 1806, during the leadup to the Jackson–Dickinson duel, Nathaniel McNairy wrote a letter to Thomas Eastin that was printed in the Impartial Review, in which he charged Jackson with "cowardice, citing his attacks on Swann and Sevier and his firing a pistol at '...a man that has none, and driv[ing] him off to Kentucky...'," which may be a reference to Robards.
- Jesse Benton claimed in an anti-Jackson pamphlet in 1824 that "Tradition tells us, that some thirty years ago, he made an attack upon an unarmed man, named Roberts, himself literally loaded with arms."
- In 1828 a political opponent stated that "The General had been but a short time residing in West Tennessee near Nashville, before he had a rencontre with the late Lewis Roberts, who swore his life against him, and Jackson was bound over to keep the peace by Col. Robert Weakly, who is now living—Roberts had not then separated from the present Mrs. Jackson. I could add many circumstances illustrative of this matter—but do not wish to injure the feelings of any unnecessarily, especially as I have always considered Mrs. Jackson ever since my acquaintance with her in 1814, as a female of virtue, and upright walk in life."
- In 1854, a resident of Rodney, Mississippi, who went by the pseudonym Idler, wrote, "One of the primitive settlers, who further stated that they were married in either Jefferson or Claiborne county, though Old Mock, the miller, who resided near Danville, Ky., doubts the marriage, and he says Jackson stole Roberts' [sic] wife and afterwards paid him for her and that Roberts was delighted to get rid of her on such easy terms. But whether married or not, they lived together happily for many years, and when she died he mourned as one who had lost all that gave value to life."
- John R. Irelan in his 18-volume history of presidential administrations claimed, "Lewis Robards had had Jackson arrested at Nashville for threats upon his peace and life, and he afterwards chased Robards with a butcher-knife, and ran him out of the settlement because Robards persisted in regarding his conduct as dishonorable towards Mrs. Robards."
- Folklore presented as such, but recited nonetheless by the Robards genealogy, states, "...when Robards returned home and found that his wife was gone with Jackson, he followed in hot pursuit with his body servant until they reached a stream near the Tennessee line called Bear Wallow. Here he found that they had crossed the stream by ferry, which was detained on the other side, cutting off his farther progress. His servant, to the day of his death gave graphic accounts of the chase, and stated that Robards and Jackson exchanged shots from the opposite sides of the river, and Jackson, fearing for the safety of the woman, hastened on his journey, while Robards returned home to consider his future course. The people living in the vicinity of Bear Wallow used to point out to strangers a tree upon the bank of the river scarred, they said, by the shots."

The only surviving documentation of the relationship between Jackson and Robards are letters that do not mention Rachel but relate to business. In 1797 Jackson bought a place called Hunter's Hill that was Robards' original land grant in Tennessee and where Mr. and Mrs. Robards were to settle. There is also a letter from Robards to Robert Hays, Jackson's brother-in-law, about the dispensation of John Donelson's estate.

== Officiant and documentation controversy ==
In the words of Toplovich, despite diligent search by political allies, enemies, historians, and genealogists for the better part of 200 years, "No credible evidence of a [1790/1791] marriage ceremony in Natchez has ever surfaced."

Plantation owner Col. Thomas M. Green, who was purported by the Nashville Campaign Committee to have performed the marriage ceremony for Mrs. Robards and Jackson, had been named a justice of the peace of Bourbon County, Georgia in 1785. However, the existence of Bourbon County was not recognized by either of the local colonial powers (Spain and the United States), and by 1788 even the U.S. state of Georgia gave up claiming that the jurisdiction existed. Technically, any marriage of Protestants that took place in the Natchez district prior to November 30, 1792 required a Roman Catholic priest but this law was often ignored and non-Catholic marriages were performed by either Protestant clergy passing through, or simply by friends of the couple. Regardless of whether a marriage ceremony took place between late 1790 and early 1791, Rachel's last name changed from Donelson to Jackson in records settling her father's estate that were filed in probate court in April 1791.

The absence of any contemporary documentation—in the words of Remini, "nothing official, and nothing in private correspondence"—reinforces the "suspicion that no marriage ever took place in Natchez." As per Remini, there is also no evidence proving the negative, so the suspicion remains just that.

== Location controversy ==
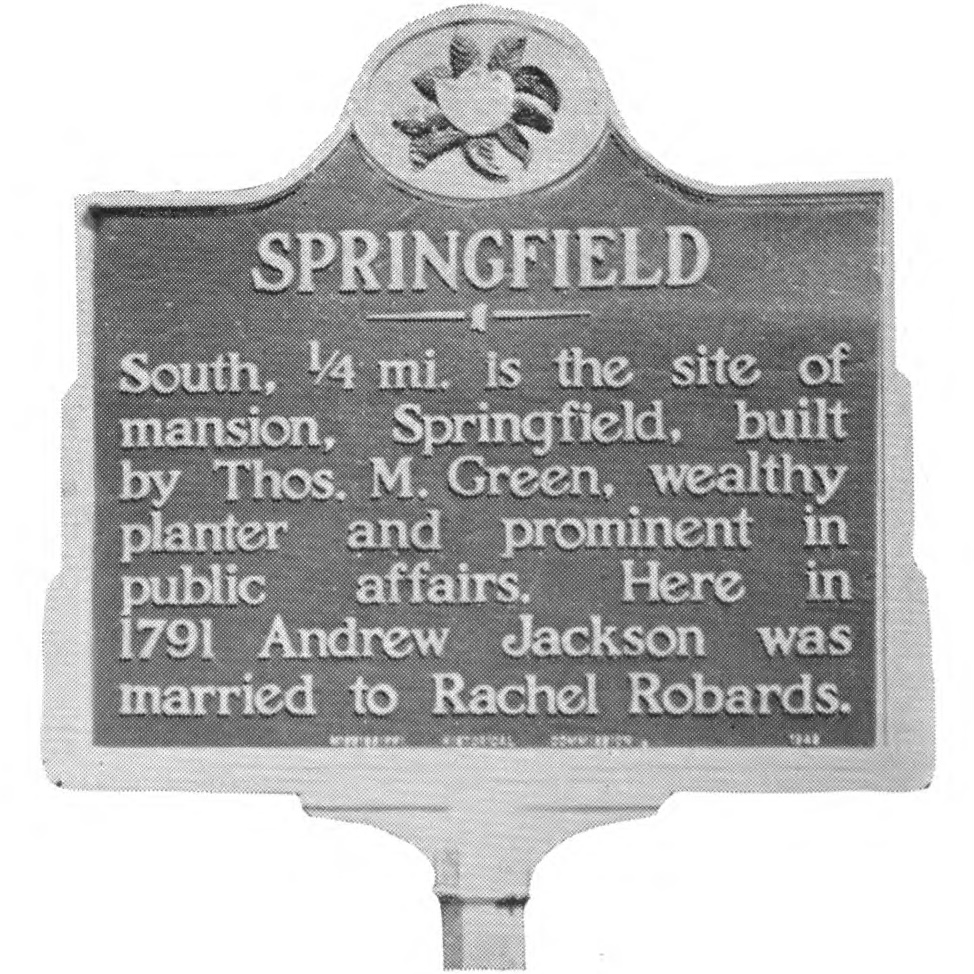
The Mississippi Historical Commission marker for Springfield repeats, unquestioningly, the Jacksonian account of the marriage

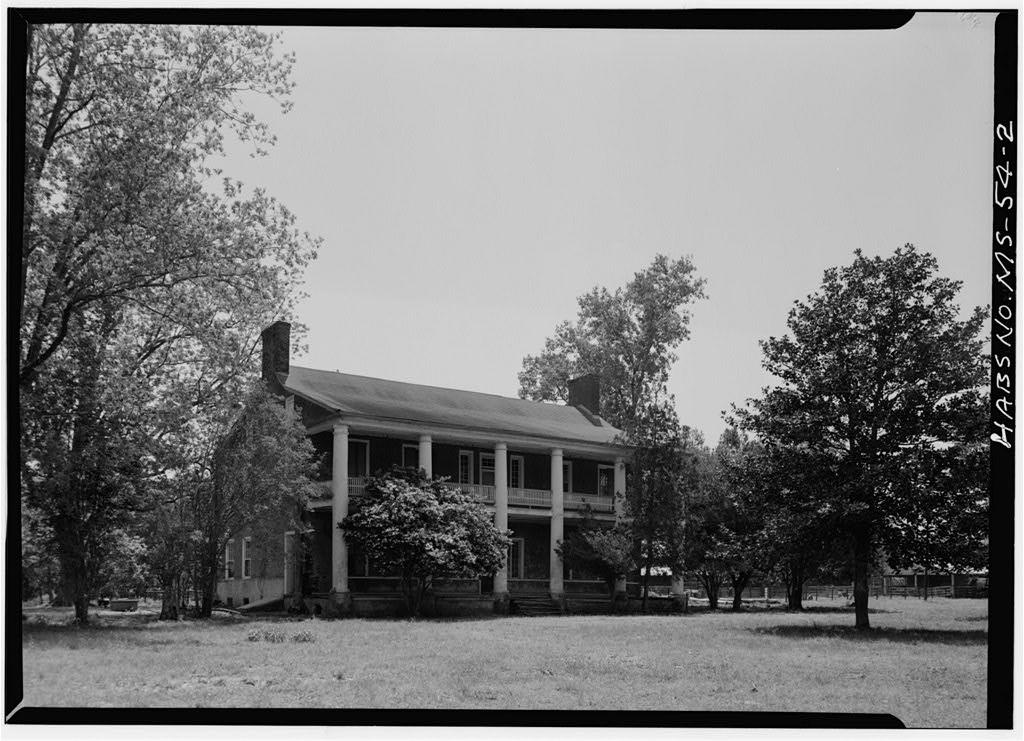
Springfield Plantation (Fayette, Mississippi), where Rachel and Andrew were allegedly married privately by Thomas M. Green Sr., after misunderstanding whether or not Rachel was divorced; no record of this marriage ceremony has been found

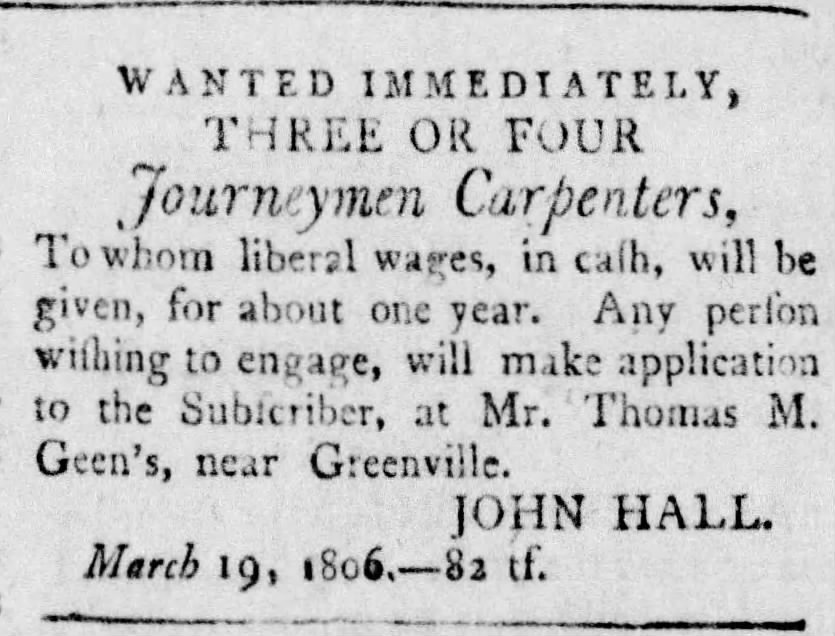
"Wanted Immediately Three or Four Journeymen Carpenters" The Mississippi Messenger, Natchez, April 8, 1806

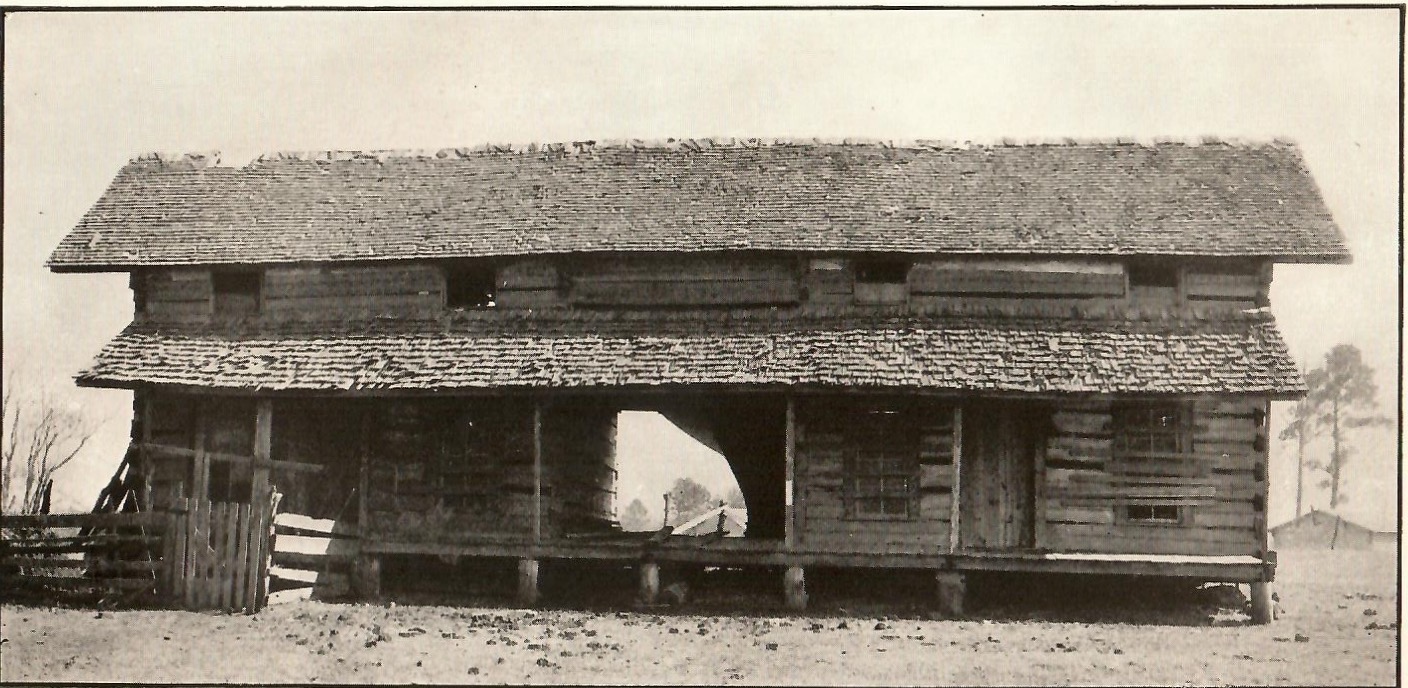
Historian Everett Dick described this type of building, sometimes called "two pens and a passage," as the "plantation house of the log-cabin aristocracy" in his 1948 Dixie Frontier

The Jacksonian line for much of the 19th and 20th centuries was that Andrew and Rachel were married 1791ish at Springfield plantation, in the vicinity of Cole's Creek, in what was then Spanish-controlled territory and is today Jefferson County, Mississippi.

One of the key pillars of the pro-Jackson narrative, absolving the couple from violating the moral code of the day, was the assertion that Rachel Robards spent the winter of 1790–91, when Robards filed for divorce, as a guest of either the Green family, which included sons Thomas M. Green Jr. and Abner Green, or Peter Bryan Bruin. The crux of this argument was that the Greens and/or Bruin were such morally upstanding men that they never would have allowed an adulteress to live under their roofs. As such, assertions that Jackson and Mrs. Robards (separately or together) had their own housing, in the vicinity of Natchez, were subject to attack by Jackson defenders. Similarly, claims that Rachel's brother John Donelson had a house in the Cole's Creek neighborhood of the Natchez District were questioned because Rachel would have been unlikely to have been sheltered at the Green home if her brother had a plantation of his own in the area.

In 1910, a Mississippi history journal article written by Eron Rowland examined the story, quoting a Mississippi resident whose father, Rev. John Griffing Jones, was born in 1804 in Jefferson County: "I fear Major McCardle's vanity and his connection with the Green family has led him into an error," referring to Robert Lowry and William H. McCardle's 1891 history of Mississippi. Jones' son also quoted a former Green family slave named Allen Collier as saying: "'Twain't so; Ole Marster's house—the Great House warn't built at that time—I 'members it, and Miss Robards don't have to go over thar to be married, when she had a good house of her own right by what da call the Jackson Springs.'" The Joneses claimed that Rachel owned a small farm sited along the Natchez Trace 1.5 miles (2.4 km) southwest of Old Greenville. The residence on this farm was double log house with an open hall, and the farm had a spring located "in the lower end of her garden was for many years known locally as Jackson's Spring." The spring mentioned by the Jones and Allen Collier was memorable in part because it "was surrounded by very luxuriant mint" which was sometimes collected by residents for use in mint juleps and similar. Regarding the presence of the Jacksons in the lower Mississippi, S. G. Heiskell, a local historian and former mayor of Knoxville, Tennessee, made a point to attack claims in an old Post-Dispatch article that there had been a "ruined log hut" near Natchez that had been the Jacksons' honeymoon house. Heiskell insisted that if the couple ever stayed together at Bruinsburg or Claiborne County environs, where Jackson traded in slaves and whiskey, it was definitely after they were properly introduced and married under the oversight of Southern gentlemen.

The 1938 WPA history of Jefferson County, Mississippi mentions Rachel Donelson's allegedly Natchez-resident brother: "Col. Jas. Payne Green, writing of Springfield in 1922, states...Jackson became acquainted with the Springfield Green by commercial transactions made at Bruinburg, and his wife became acquainted with the Greens through the brother, who was a wealthy planter in Adams County, near Natchez." A 1985 genealogy of families related to the Greens mentions, "One article says that Rachel Robards had a brother, John, who owned some land near Natchez, who she came to visit. If that is so, it is strange that she stayed at the Greens." There was a Juan Donaldson recorded as a resident of the Villa Gayoso section of the Natchez District in the Spanish colonial census of 1792. A Natchez court record abstract created by May McBee mentions John Donelson II testifying in a 1793 case, "Dist. of Villa Gayoso. Personally appeared John Donelson, who, on oath, deposed that John Jarrett told him that he had rented from Mr. Thomas Green, senior, his place upon the bluff, at the rent of six chair frames, and the said Jarratt was also to take care of Mr. Green's hogs and stock on sd plantation and other property on the place."

== Death of Rachel Jackson controversy ==
Rachel Jackson died of a heart attack at age 61, shortly before Andrew Jackson was to take office as President of the United States. Jackson blamed his political opponents for her death, but she had started showing signs of heart disease at least three years earlier.

== Jackson's marriage in politics: 1828 election and beyond ==
When Jackson ran for president in 1828 (the second of three times), his political enemies revived the story of how his romance with Rachel began. An East Tennessee Congressional candidate named Thomas Dickens Arnold "brought the marriage question into the open by publishing an article stating that Jackson, a 'lump of naked deformity,' had 'tor[n] from a husband the wife of his bosom,' that he had 'driven [Robards] off like a dog, and had taken his wife.'" When the issue resurfaced in 1828, Jackson's friend John Overton wrote a long testimonial misrepresenting the timeline and rationalizing the couple's behavior. At least one historian has compared the construction of this account to how Jackson lied "that he had received a message from President Monroe through John Rhea...authorizing his conduct in the invasion of Florida" and then convinced Rhea to "vouch for its truth." In both 1884 and 1936, historians proved Jackson's story about the Rhea letter to be "a complete fabrication". As Frances Clifton put it in her study of Jackson's long friendship with John Overton, "Jackson's irregular marriage proved good propaganda for the friends of Adams and Clay. The political enemies of Jackson 'saw in his wife a weak spot in his armor through which his vitals might be reached; and they did not hesitate to make the most of it.'"

In 1834, three years after Jackson's relationship with U.S. Senator George Poindexter had disintegrated following the latter's objection to the former's proposed appointment of nephew Stockley D. Hays to a Land Office job, Jackson accused Poindexter of having lured his wife into marriage with a promise of $20,000 but "her dowry has been stripes." Poindexter responded in a public letter, "If the assertion made by Mr. Jackson, was as true as it is ridiculously false that I induced my wife to marry me by a promise of twenty thousand dollars as her dower—I have at least the consolation to know that I did not steal her from the lawful owner!! perhaps Mr. Jackson may understand the illusion [sic]."

== Other aspects: Economic, moral, social, feminist aspects ==
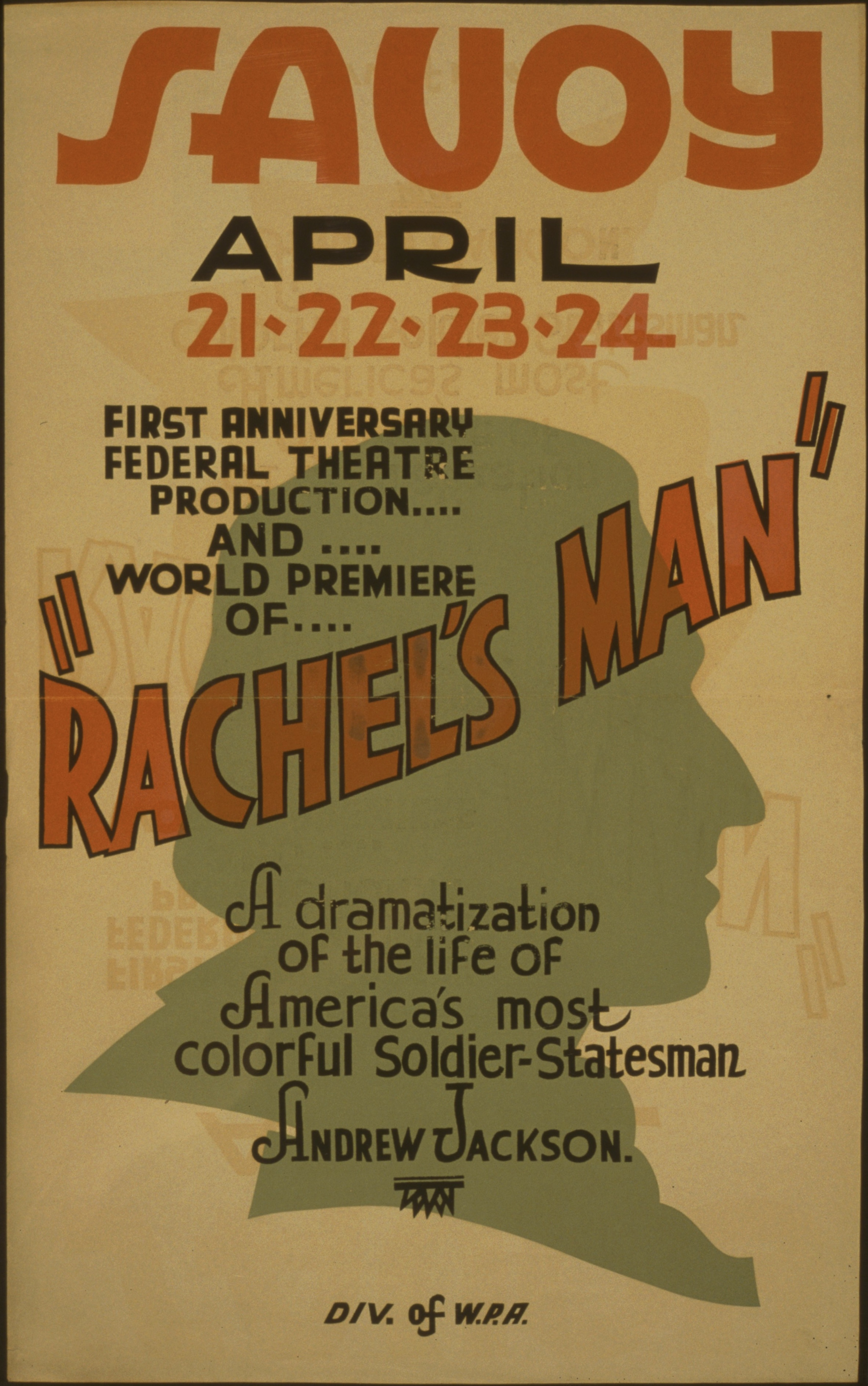
Federal Theatre Project production of Rachel's man, 1937 (LCCN 98517761)

According to historian Donald B. Cole, increasing urbanization and changing social mores made room for the "romantic...view that such acts were private in nature and that love should be allowed to triumph over legalisms."

Historian Ann Toplovich, in her article about the love triangle, wrote about the impossible situation in which Rachel Stockley Donelson Robards found herself in 1789:

Unlike men, women did not have recourse to the divorce process as a means of recovering honor. If her petition failed, a woman's husband would still control her life because of coverture; a wife had no legal entity separate from her husband. And if she won, a woman's character suffered damage. Marriage to a man to whom she had been linked before the divorce was seen as a confession of illicit sexual relations. That a woman of Rachel Donelson's status chose the extralegal recourse of desertion to end her marriage is extraordinary.

Historian Melissa Gismondi has suggested that Rachel's mother, John Donelson's widow, Rachel Stockley Donelson, played a poorly understood but key role in the breakup and remarriage. Gismondi argues that Lewis Robards' struggles with his personal finances, especially in a frontier economy where kinship networks were coequal with business relationships, were concerning to his in-laws. Further to the point, Robards was a Kentuckian and the Donelsons and their business interests were centered in middle Tennessee. Given that the marriage was both childless and "miserable", a move to Tennessee benefitted Rachel the younger emotionally and positioned her for a new partnership, one that may have been preferred by both Mrs. Donelson and her adult children as it offered both the prospect of happiness for Rachel and the prospect of increased profit for the various family businesses. This conclusion is not inconsistent with other analyses of the interdependence between kinship and trade in the frontier south. In 2017, Natalie Inman wrote, "[Andrew and Rachel's] marriage epitomized what was possible in familial networking. Jackson gained an army of brothers, literally."

== See also ==
- Retcon
- Early career of Andrew Jackson
- Bibliography of Andrew Jackson
- Andrew Jackson and the slave trade in the United States § Slave trading, 1789–1799
- The President's Lady
- John Donelson § Descendants

== Sources ==
- Basch, Norma (December 1993). "Marriage, Morals, and Politics in the Election of 1828". The Journal of American History. 80 (3): 890–918. doi:10.2307/2080408. ISSN 0021-8723. JSTOR 2080408.
- Cole, Donald B. (2009). Vindicating Andrew Jackson: The 1828 Election and the Rise of the Two-Party System. American Presidential Elections. Lawrence, Kansas: University Press of Kansas. ISBN 978-0-7006-1661-9. LCCN 2009015244. OCLC 318645762. Project MUSE book 87476.
- Drew, Bettina Lee (December 2001). Master Andrew Jackson: Indian Removal and the Culture of Slavery (Thesis). Yale University. UMI 3030759. ProQuest 3030759
- Owsley, Harriet Chappell (1977). "The Marriages of Rachel Donelson". Tennessee Historical Quarterly. 36 (4): 479–492. ISSN 0040-3261. JSTOR 42625784.
- Robards, James Harvey (1910). History and genealogy of the Robards family. Franklin, Indiana: W. R. Voris, Printer. pp. 31–33 – via Allen County Public Library, Internet Archive.
- Toplovich, Ann (2005). "Marriage, Mayhem, and Presidential Politics: The Robards–Jackson Backcountry Scandal" (PDF). Ohio Valley History. 5 (4): 3–22. ISSN 2377-0600. Project MUSE 572973.
