= Lewis Robards =

Kentucky pioneer (1758–1814)

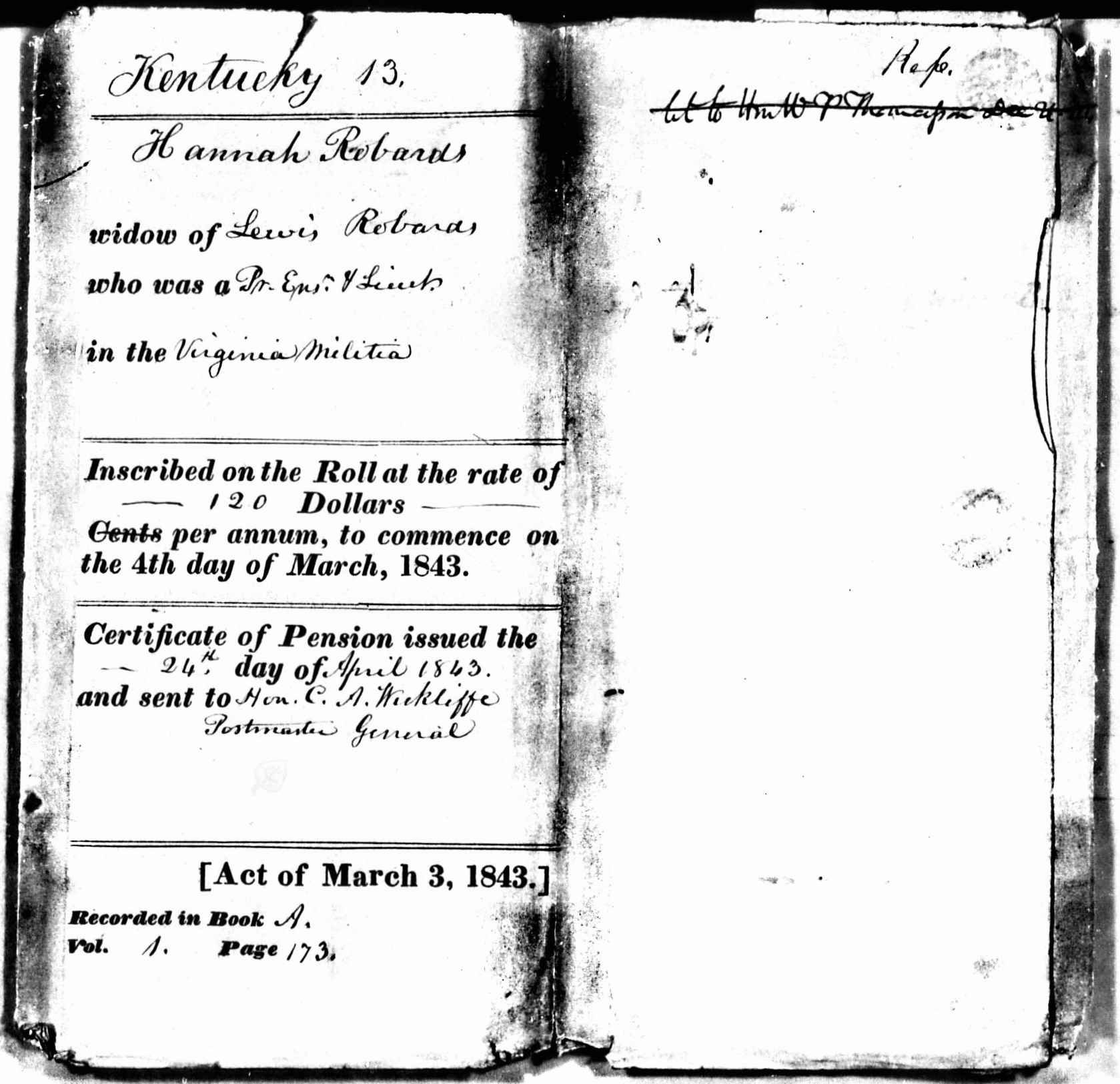
Pension record for Lewis Robards' widow Hannah Winn Robards

Lewis Robards (December 5, 1758 – April 15, 1814) was an American Revolutionary War veteran and Kentucky pioneer who is best remembered as the first husband of Rachel Jackson (who was later married to Andrew Jackson, the seventh president of the United States).

== Biography ==
The seventh of his father's 13 children, Robards was born in Goochland County, Virginia. His mother was descended from one of the First Families of Virginia, his father had been a "militia lieutenant during the French and Indian War and...a member of Goochland County's Committee of Safety in 1775". The American Revolution began when Robards was a young man, and he enlisted in May 1778. By 1791 he had been promoted from second lieutenant to first lieutenant and up to captain, thus he is sometimes designated as Captain Lewis Robards, in part to distinguish him from relatives with identical names. He saw combat at Richmond and the James River and was present at the siege of Yorktown.

After the father died in Virginia in 1783, Lewis, several of his siblings, and his mother moved to Cane Run, Kentucky, in what is now Mercer County, where they owned several hundred acres that had been partially cleared. A 1913 history of Tennessee written by Will T. Hale and Dixon L. Merritt, quoting from a possibly-never-published manuscript history of the Green River area written by Lucius P. Little, provides some additional detail on the Robards family:

For reasons best known to the historians, they have apparently tried to commit Captain Robards to oblivion. The student searches the books in vain for satisfying data. The Robards family was a distinguished one. Judge Little says: Lewis Robards, a native of Goochland county, Virginia, had followed his older brother George into the Virginia army at the outbreak of the Revolutionary War. They continued in service until peace was declared, and meantime each had won the title of captain. In the vicinity of Harrodsburg (Ky.) they located a large tract of rich land and became settlers on Cane Run. Here they remained two or three years clearing and improving their lands and also doing their part in resisting Indian attacks and driving the savage out of the country. Their father having died, they returned to Virginia, and after settling his estate came back to Kentucky, bringing with them their widowed mother and her family of children, and located in a log house on their lands. Embraced in the father's estate was a large number of slaves who were also brought west. In a few years, and as the Robards girls reached womanhood, the mother decided on a more capacious dwelling, and so a stone house was erected near a famous spring, better suited to the family's needs and tastes. The pioneers were greatly given to marrying and giving in marriage at a period when the affections were young and fresh. Captain George Robards went to Virginia and brought back as a bride Elizabeth Sampson, a lovely grand-daughter of the old Huguenot family, Dutois. From her descended the distinguished Thompson family of Kentucky. The widow Robards' oldest daughter married Hon. Thomas Davis, one of the earliest congressmen of the state. Another daughter married Capt. John Jouett, a Revolutionary soldier, who received from the Virginia legislature a sword for gallantry in battle and who was one of the state's first citizens. The sons of Captain Jouett were also men of note, the famous portrait painter, Matt Jouett, being one. The circumstances leading to the marriage of Captain Lewis Robards were briefly these: It was after the family had moved to the stone house that on a wintry day, Mrs. Donelson, a widow, was overtaken by a storm in the Cane Run neighborhood and besought Mrs. Robards for permission to occupy the deserted log dwelling. In hospitable Kentucky she had but to ask such a favor and it was granted. Rachel, a daughter of the mover, was handsome, bright-eyed and attractive, but lacking in culture and refinement. She did not long escape the observation of Lewis Robards, or fail to realize that she was being favorably observed. Lewis was a bachelor of thirty, not much of a gallant, with a penchant for horses and hounds, a good shot, an expert hunter, and a valuable man in an Indian raid. But he had very little to do with the gentler sex on his own account. So before he was aware of what might come to pass, he was hopelessly enamored. A short courtship followed and marriage transferred Rachel from the log cabin to the stone house as a member of the Robards family. She was a sprightly talker, a graceful dancer, of a cheery disposition, and these qualities coupled with her fair face won the hearts of the entire household.

Mary Emily Donelson Wilcox, daughter of Andrew Jackson Donelson and Emily Tennessee Donelson added to this family narrative that Elizabeth Robards Davis married second Davis Floyd, and that the youngest Robards sister married "William Buckner, ancestor of General Simon Bolivar Buckner. Their mother, proud and high-spirited, was considered the most influential personage in the Blue Grass region." The Robards genealogy also states that Thomas Davis and Andrew Jackson's old partner John Overton were "distant relatives."

According to one account published in 1884, the meeting of the two families was not happenstance prompted a storm but rather prompted by hunger: "During a corn famine Gen. Donelson, with his family, went to Kentucky." The couple married on March 1, 1785, at Harrodsburg, in what was considered an advantageous match between two prominent and wealthy frontier families. The marriage allowed 17-year-old Rachel to stay in Kentucky even though her father was moving back to Tennessee.

Historians generally use euphemistic language to convey that both parties to the marriage were rich and young, drank (possibly too much), and had affairs, and generally demonstrated poor emotional regulation. Lewis Robards allegedly "frequented the slave quarters at night"—and as a recent Smithsonian article points out, these sexual encounters were enslaved women "almost certainly without their consent." Rachel Donelson Robards may have had some kind of passionate entanglement with Peyton Short before Andrew Jackson came into the picture. Robards may have been a "son-of-a-bitch," and he may have been a slave trader. Another account describes him as "a rather suspicious-minded and jealous individual, who constantly quarreled with his wife and accused her of all manner of improprieties, some of which he himself was guilty. Robards also quarreled with Jackson and at one point Jackson threatened 'to cut the ears out of [Robards's] head.' At length Robards swore he would never live with Rachel again and left Nashville and returned to Kentucky." Still another account has it that Robards contacted Rachel's mother and told her to come get her daughter because he wanted her out of their house. In 1789, Andrew Jackson and Rachel Donelson Robards ran off together to the Natchez District, and eventually Robards sued Rachel for divorce on grounds of adultery. The Robards–Donelson–Jackson relationship controversy has been an ongoing scandal ever since, not to mention a major issue during the 1828 U.S. presidential election.

After his first marriage was a closed book, Lewis Robards married Hannah Winn. They had ten children together before Robards died in 1814. In the account of Little, "A year or so after the granting of his divorce Captain Robards married a lovely refined woman, whom he took to his Mercer county home. Happily mated, he realized his brightest dreams of domestic life. His children grew up around him, and fulfilled all reasonable parental hopes. A home on a farm of broad acres in the Blue Grass region of Kentucky in the first half of the nineteenth century was quite enough to realize all the aspirations of the home-loving heart."

== Lewis Robards v. Andrew Jackson ==
One of Robards' descendants, grandson William J. Robards, defended his grandfather's honor into the 20th century, as retold by the Louisville Herald in 1904:

"Andrew Jackson despoiled my grandfather's home, stole his wife and married that woman two years before a divorce had been obtained," exclaimed Mr. Robards with emphasis, "and this after receiving the hospitalities of my grandfather's home. My grandfather was one of the highly esteemed men of his time in Kentucky, and his family was one of the most prominent in the territory, equal to, if not better, than that of the woman to whom he first married."

The relationship between Jackson and Robards is the least understood aspect of the triangle.

- In 1806, during the leadup to the Jackson–Dickinson duel, Nathaniel McNairy wrote a letter to Thomas Eastin that was printed in the Impartial Review, in which he charged Jackson with "cowardice, citing his attacks on Swann and Sevier and his firing a pistol at '...a man that has none, and driv[ing] him off to Kentucky...'," which may be a reference to Robards.
- Jesse Benton claimed in an anti-Jackson pamphlet in 1824 that "Tradition tells us, that some thirty years ago, he made an attack upon an unarmed man, named Roberts, himself literally loaded with arms."
- In 1828 a political opponent stated that "The General had been but a short time residing in West Tennessee near Nashville, before he had a rencontre with the late Lewis Roberts, who swore his life against him, and Jackson was bound over to keep the peace by Col. Robert Weakly, who is now living—Roberts had not then separated from the present Mrs. Jackson. I could add many circumstances illustrative of this matter—but do not wish to injure the feelings of any unnecessarily, especially as I have always considered Mrs. Jackson ever since my acquaintance with her in 1814, as a female of virtue, and upright walk in life."
- In 1854, a resident of Rodney, Mississippi, who went by the pseudonym Idler, wrote, "One of the primitive settlers, who further stated that they were married in either Jefferson or Claiborne county, though Old Mock, the miller, who resided near Danville, Ky., doubts the marriage, and he says Jackson stole Roberts' [sic] wife and afterwards paid him for her and that Roberts was delighted to get rid of her on such easy terms. But whether married or not, they lived together happily for many years, and when she died he mourned as one who had lost all that gave value to life."
- John R. Irelan in his 18-volume history of presidential administrations claimed, "Lewis Robards had had Jackson arrested at Nashville for threats upon his peace and life, and he afterwards chased Robards with a butcher-knife, and ran him out of the settlement because Robards persisted in regarding his conduct as dishonorable towards Mrs. Robards."
- Folklore presented as such, but recited nonetheless by the Robards genealogy, states, "...when Robards returned home and found that his wife was gone with Jackson, he followed in hot pursuit with his body servant until they reached a stream near the Tennessee line called Bear Wallow. Here he found that they had crossed the stream by ferry, which was detained on the other side, cutting off his farther progress. His servant, to the day of his death gave graphic accounts of the chase, and stated that Robards and Jackson exchanged shots from the opposite sides of the river, and Jackson, fearing for the safety of the woman, hastened on his journey, while Robards returned home to consider his future course. The people living in the vicinity of Bear Wallow used to point out to strangers a tree upon the bank of the river scarred, they said, by the shots."

The only surviving documentation of the relationship between Jackson and Robards are letters that do not mention Rachel but relate to business. In 1797 Jackson bought a place called Hunter's Hill that was Robards' original land grant in Tennessee and where Mr. and Mrs. Robards were to settle. There is also a letter from Robards to Robert Hays, Jackson's brother-in-law, about the dispensation of John Donelson's estate.

== Descendants ==
1. Mortimer Delvin Robards (1794–1869) m. Liddie Shain
2. George Lewis Robards (b. 1795)
3. James Winn Robards (1797–1853) m. Rachel Shain
4. W. J. Robards (b. 1798)
5. Alfred J. Robards (b. 1800)
6. Granville Robards (b. 1802)
7. Robert Robards (b. 1804)
8. Benjamin Franklin Robards (b. 1806)
9. Eliza Robards (b. 1809)
10. Margaret Lewis Robards (1811–1843) m. Squire Shain

George Lewis Robards served in the Battle of New Orleans (where Andrew Jackson came to national fame). Two of George Lewis Robards' sons, Lewis C. Robards and Alfred O. Robards, were slave traders in the Lexington, Kentucky area; they were implicated in multiple kidnapping into slavery cases. Lewis C. Robards was also notorious as a dealer in "fancy girls".

== See also ==
- Andrew Jackson and the slave trade in the United States
- Springfield Plantation (Fayette, Mississippi)
- Bear Wallow, Barren County, Kentucky
