= The Marriage Bond =

The Marriage Bond may refer to:

- The Marriage Bond, an American play by Rida Johnson Young
- The Marriage Bond (1916 film), an American film adaptation
- The Marriage Bond (1932 film), a British film directed by Maurice Elvey

== See also ==
- Marriage bond
