= Fort Nashborough =

- Formerly listed on the U.S. National Register of Historic Places
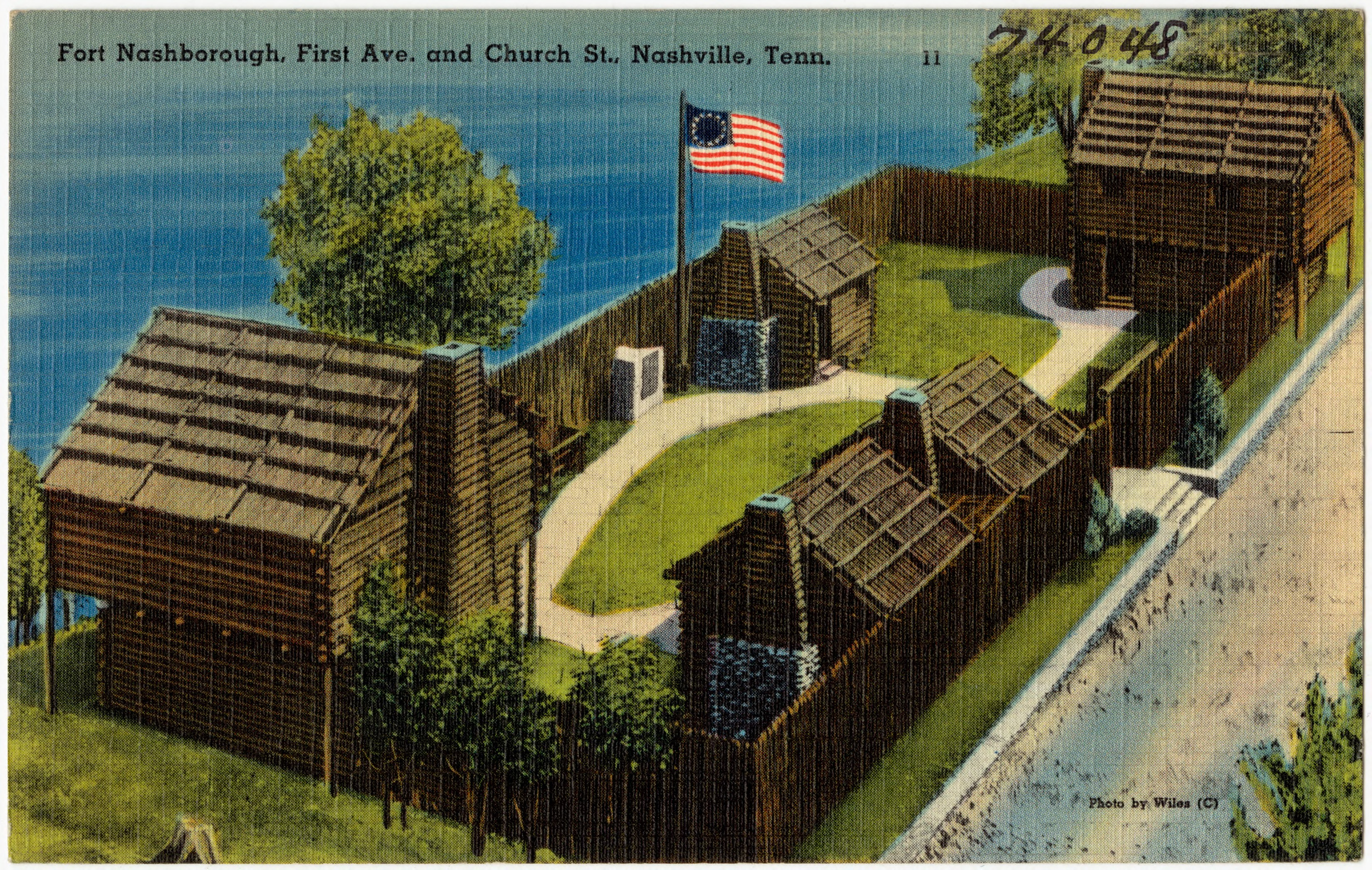
- A historical reconstruction of Fort Nashborough

- Location within Tennessee Location within the United States
- Coordinates: 36°9′51″N 86°46′28″W
- Architect: North Carolina Militia (Overmountain Men)
- Architectural style: log stockade
- NRHP reference No.: 11000454

Significant dates
- Added to NRHP: July 13, 2011
- Removed from NRHP: November 24, 2015

Fort Nashborough, also known as Fort Bluff, Bluff Station, French Lick Fort, Cumberland River Fort and other names, was the stockade established in early 1779 in the French Lick area of the Cumberland River valley, as a forerunner to the settlement that would become the city of Nashville, Tennessee. The fort was not a military garrison. The log stockade was square in shape and covered 2 acres (8,100 m^{2}). It contained 20 log cabins and was protection for the settlers against wild animals and Indians. James Robertson and John Donelson are considered the founders, and colloquially, the "founders of Tennessee". The fort was abandoned in 1794, but the settlement, now the city of Nashville, became the capital of the new state of Tennessee in 1843.

== Background ==
The American Revolution broke out one month after Richard Henderson's purchase agreement with the Cherokee for the lands of the proposed Transylvania settlement was signed in March, 1775. The purchase included land above the Cumberland River in North Carolina (now north central Tennessee). Though much of the purchase had been invalidated by Virginia in 1778, lands in the vicinity of the Cumberland were still outstanding.

Most Cherokee towns wished to stay neutral in the growing contest between the colonists and Britain, but Chief Dragging Canoe considered the war an opportunity to resist the continual encroachment by frontiersmen on traditional Cherokee territories. American retaliatory raids against his Cherokee towns in eastern Tennessee eventually forced Dragging Canoe to move his people farther to the south and west –down the Tennessee River. In 1779 they settled along Chickamauga Creek (near present-day Chattanooga, Tennessee), becoming known as the Chickamauga Cherokees. Later they were forced to move even further west and southwest, where they established the "Five Lower Towns", and were often thereafter referred to as the "Lower Cherokee". Dragging Canoe had admonished the settlers that encroachment would result in "dark and bloody ground", and he would make good on his word.

== Establishment ==
=== Preparations ===
In 1689, French-Canadian trader Martin Chartier established a trading post on the Cumberland River, near the present-day site of Nashville. In 1714, a group of French traders under the command of Charles Charleville established a settlement and trading post at the present location of downtown Nashville, which became known as French Lick. These settlers quickly established an extensive fur trading network with the local Native Americans, but by the 1740s the settlement had largely been abandoned. In 1779, John Buchanan Sr. migrated with his family from Cumberland County, Pennsylvania, to North Carolina. He first went to the "over-mountain" area of Virginia (modern day eastern Kentucky) in order to leave the party's women and small children in a secure area. The settlers then headed down the Cumberland River and, in early 1779, built a fortified station at French Lick.

In February 1779, Overmountain leader James Robertson set out with a nine-man exploration party to the same area. Robertson had been a member of the Regulator Movement, as well as a founding leader of the Watauga settlement. A 3,000 acres (12 km^{2}) land grant was negotiated with Richard Henderson, a North Carolina land speculator, and arrangements were made for the movement of the group's families to the area. The colonists agreed to pay Henderson 26 pounds of silver per hundred acres, which was then considered an expensive price (equal to approximately $6.20/acre). Robertson charged three of his men to stay behind and plant corn in preparation for the arrival of the much larger group, which had remained behind in the Washington District.

Robertson then journeyed to the Illinois Country (an area claimed by Virginia at the time) to meet with General George Rogers Clark (a land agent of Virginia), who was dispensing "cabin rights" on very favorable terms. Robertson, whose 1772 Watauga settlement had originally been opposed to the control of the area by the Province of North Carolina, thought it possible that the yet-to-be established extended border between the Virginia and North Carolina frontiers might throw control of any new Cumberland River settlement to Virginia. Therefore, he wished to get secure and clear land titles to eliminate any future complications over ownership. After making provisional arrangements with General Clark, Robertson prepared for the colonization of the Cumberland country.

=== Robertson by land ===
On 1 November 1779, Robertson led some 200 settlers from Fort Patrick Henry, on Long Island, Kingsport, Tennessee toward Fort Nashborough. These settlers were to prepare for the later arrival of the party's women and children and were led by John Donelson out of the east over waterways. Robertson's brothers, Mark and John, were in the party, as well as his oldest son, 11-year-old Jonathan, who drove the sheep. The men were joined en route by John Rains and a number of his friends and allied families. This group decided to settle at French Lick, rather than continue upriver into that area which later became Kentucky. Their journey ended on Christmas Day, due to delays caused by the winter (described as the coldest one any of them had ever known).

=== Donelson by river ===
Starting out in early 1780, Donelson's group was halted after traveling only three miles on their river voyage. Ice, snow and cold had set in and the frozen river made progress impossible. There was no further movement until mid-February, and when the boats were eventually cut loose, they were hampered again by the swell of the river due to incessant heavy rains. Donelson's group also suffered greatly from Dragging Canoe's promise of vengeance. On their way to French Lick they had to pass the Chickamauga towns on the westward flow of the Tennessee River. When the Donelson party had succeeded in that, however, and made the turn to the north (in what is today Hardin County, Tennessee), the natives attacked them as they went past the Tennessee River's "Big Bend" (at Cerro Gordo). The war party captured one boat with 28 people on board. (Note: The settlers had come that way because Donelson and Robertson had mistakenly assumed the Cumberland River to be a tributary of the Tennessee River. The Cumberland is, in fact and like the Tennessee, a tributary of the Ohio River, and the journey by river turned out to be much more difficult, taking three months longer than they had expected.) On March 20, 1780, they arrived at the mouth of the Tennessee River and set up camp on a lowland which is now the site of Paducah, Kentucky. Weary, hungry and low on provisions, they were confronted by new difficulties. Their boats, having been constructed to float downstream, were scarcely able to ascend the rapid current of the Ohio, which due to heavy spring rains was particularly high and fast. They were also ignorant of the distance yet to be traveled, and the length of time which would be required to reach their final destination. Some of the company decided to abandon the journey to French Lick. A part of them floated down the Ohio and Mississippi Rivers to Natchez, the rest settling at points in Illinois along the Ohio.

The others, however, were determined to pursue their course up the Ohio from Paducah to the mouth of the Cumberland River, a distance which turned out to be only fifteen miles (24 km). Upon seeing it, they were unsure it was the Cumberland, because it seemed very much smaller in volume than they had expected to find. However, they had heard of no stream flowing into the Ohio between the Tennessee and Cumberland, and, therefore, decided to make the ascent. They were soon assured by the widening channel that they were correct in their conjectures. In order to make progress upstream, Donelson rigged his boat, the Adventure, with a small sail made out of a sheet. To prevent ill effects from any sudden gust of wind, a man was stationed at each lower corner of this sail with instructions to loosen it when the breeze became too strong.

=== Settled ===
Upon reaching their destination, Donelson reunited with Robertson, and the group cleared the land, building a settlement which they named in honor of General Francis Nash, who had won acclaim fighting in the American Revolution. Together these frontiersmen built other fortified "way-stations" in the vicinity which were named for members of the party; among these were Clover Bottom Mansion (the Donelson family plantation on the Stones River); Freeland's Station; Mansker's Station; Thompson's Station; and Buchanan's Station—many still remembered as neighborhoods or towns in the modern Nashville area.

In 1780, Robertson drew up a constitution called the "Cumberland Compact," and the area began a new phase of autonomy from the government of North Carolina.

== Fort life ==
Buffalo, black bear, wild turkeys, white tail deer, beaver, raccoon, fox, elk, wolf, cougar, mink, and otter were abundant in the untamed forests. The pioneer family's most treasured possessions were their guns for hunting, axes for wood-cutting, seeds, and hoes for cultivating. Frontier life was a constant struggle, and without these necessities, survival was at risk. Corn was the most important crop for their daily diet, and corn whiskey was the remedy for all health problems. Henderson, ever the profiteer, arranged to have corn shipped from Kentucky at a cost of $200 a bushel for that first winter in Nashville. Linen, made from flax, or cotton was used for clothes. Animal skins and hides supplemented their wardrobes. The first white child born in the new settlement was James Robertson's son, Felix, on January 11, 1781. He eventually became one of the most influential physicians of the era.

The North Carolina Land Act of 1783 dubbed the "Land Grab Act" offered lots in 100-acre (0.40 km^{2}) tracts for the price of about five dollars. Much property was awarded for honorable military service. Native American lands reserved by treaties and previous claims were not legally available, but in the haste, confusion and greed, there were many squatters and boundary disputes.

=== Native American attacks ===
The largest and most numerous tribes in the region were the Muscogee (Creek) to the south, and the Cherokee to the east and over the Cumberland Plateau, who were originally peaceful to the eastern British colonials. But from the beginning, the Cumberland settlements had very little peace, and were continually attacked. The tribes resented past concessions, broken treaties, and further encroachment on their hunting grounds.

War Chief Dragging Canoe's Chickamauga Cherokee, and their Muscogee allies, continued attacks on the frontier settlements for the next fourteen years. The settlers had to be on guard against Indian attacks at all times. On April 2, 1781, a force of Chickamauga Cherokee attacked the fort at the bluffs. In the attack, known as the "Battle of the Bluffs," the Indians succeeded in luring most of the men out of the fort, then cutting them off from the entrance. But the settlers managed to escape back to the fort, while the Cherokee captured their horses. They also had help from the fort's dogs, turned loose by the women. The attacks decreased the following year.

Because of political pressures, the Cherokee allies of the Chickasaw decided to make peace with the Cumberland settlers and the new nation. This was partially because Piominko, an influential chief and leader, considered the pioneers to be less of a threat than the Spanish government.

== Incorporation ==
The settlement was incorporated as the town of Nashville by North Carolina in 1784. It went on to become the capital of Tennessee upon its admission as the 16th state in 1796. It was chartered as a city in 1806, and is the largest city in the state in the modern era.

== History Center ==
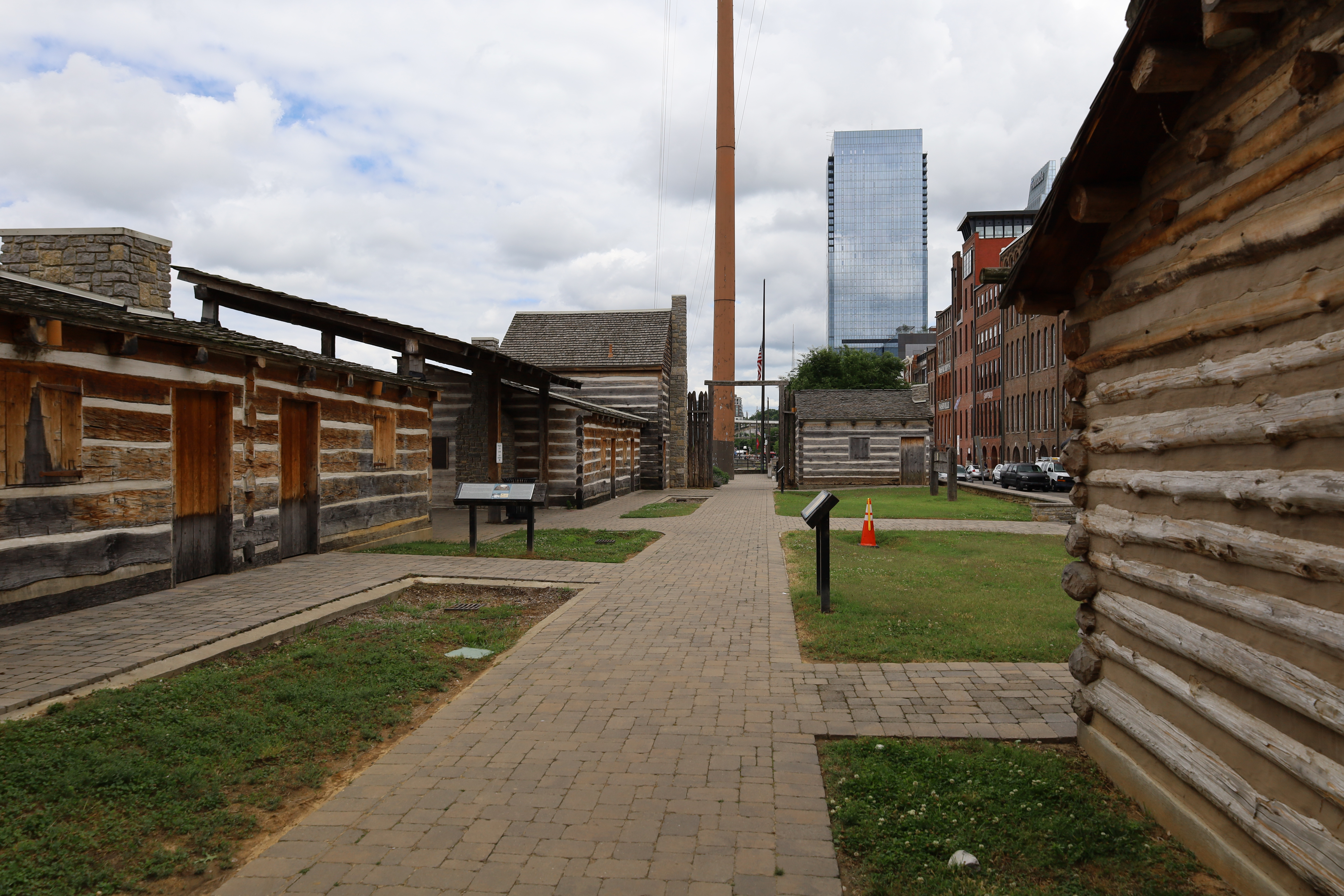
Fort Nashborough History Center in 2022

A small replica of the fort, located in Downtown Nashville along First Avenue North, several hundred meters from the original site of the fort, was built in the 1930s, fell into disrepair and was demolished in 2015. On July 13, 2017, a ribbon-cutting ceremony was held at the site of the newly renovated Fort Nashborough History Center, where families from Nashville and around the world can learn about Nashville's story. The new History Center is a more inclusive representation of the past, and includes a plaza dedicated to Native American history.

== See also ==
- Chickamauga wars
- Transylvania Company, Richard Henderson's land grant vehicle
- Washington District Regiment of the North Carolina militia
- Mansker's Station
- Haysborough, Tennessee
- Timeline of Nashville, Tennessee
