= Haysborough, Tennessee =

U.S. extinct settlement

Coordinates: 36°13′56″N 86°42′50″W

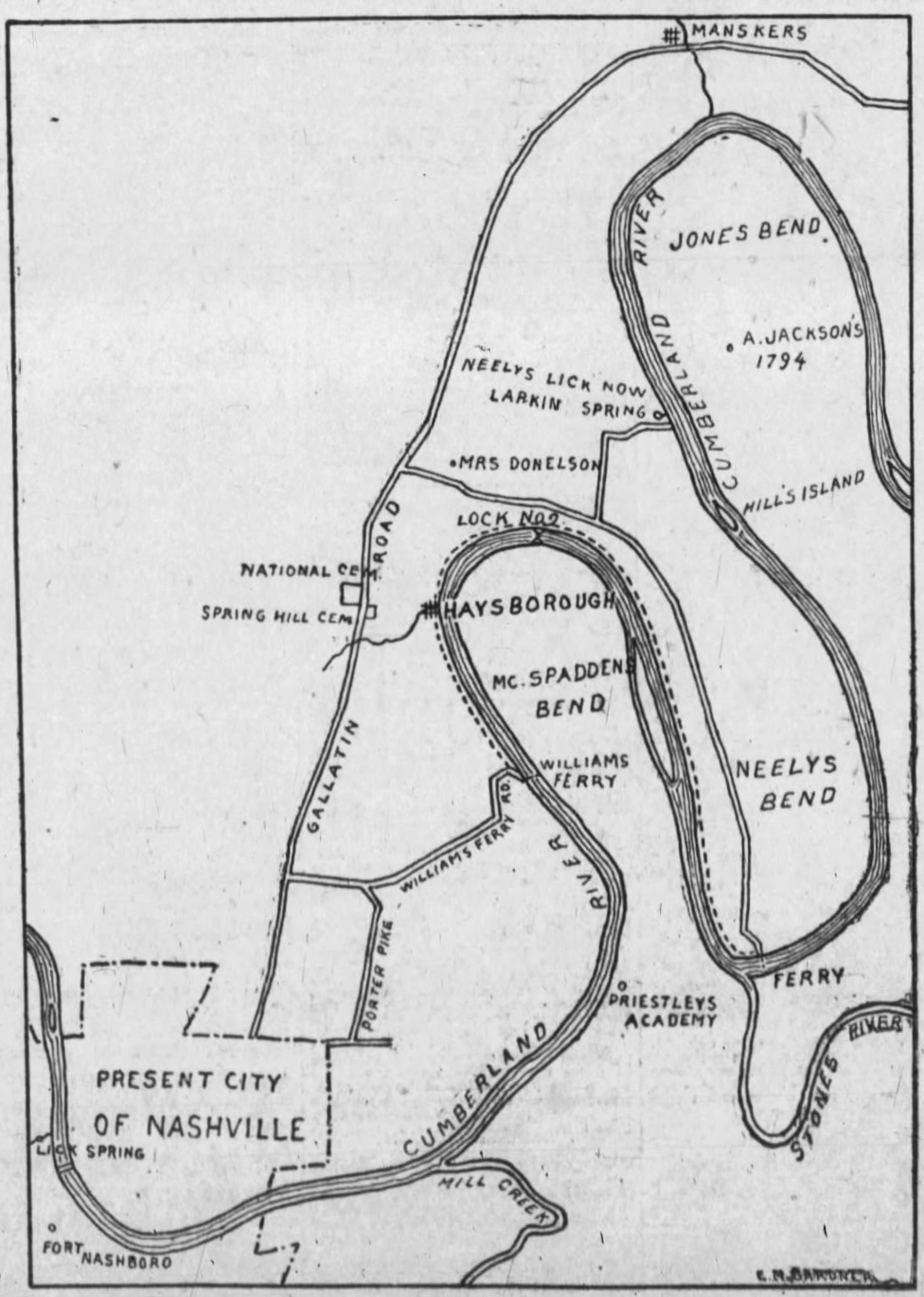
"Old Haysborough and Surroundings"

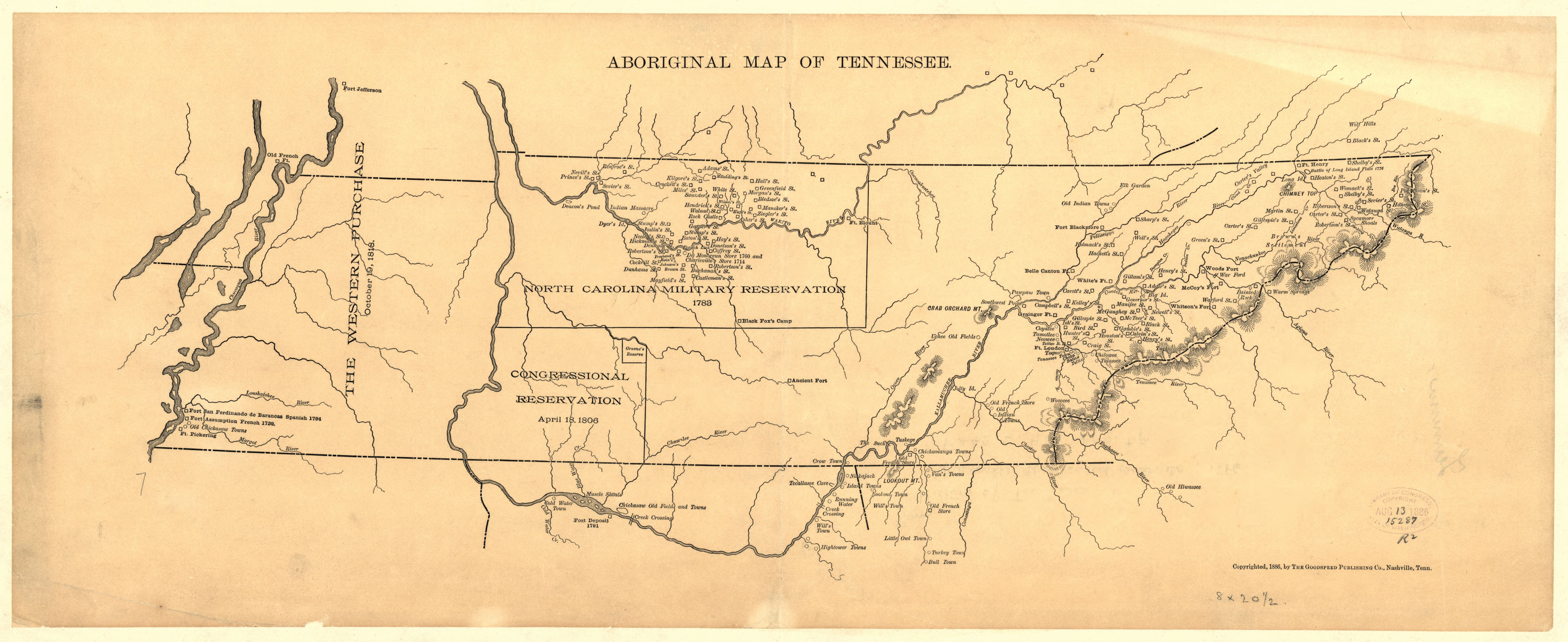
"Aboriginal map of Tennessee"

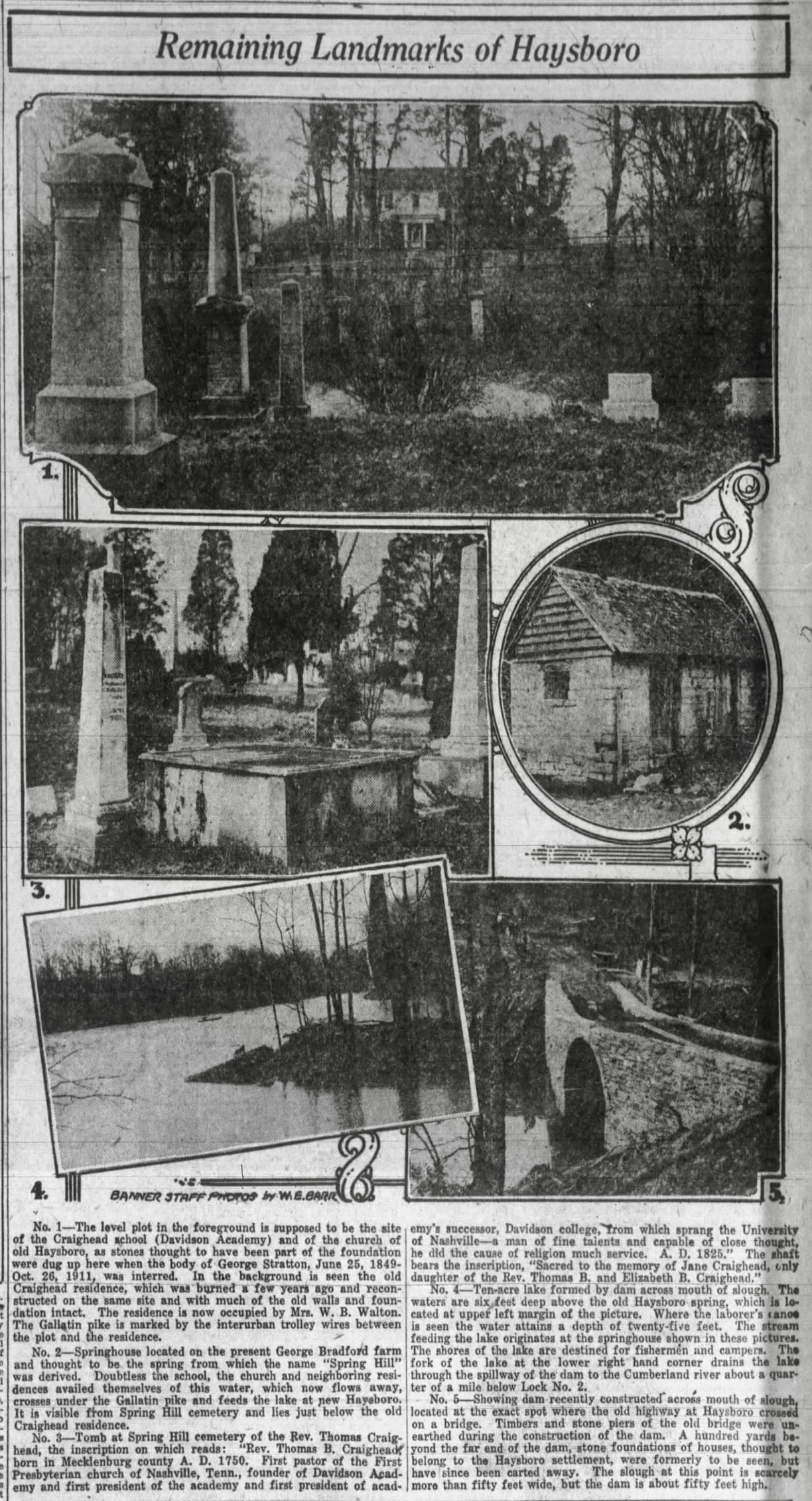
"Remaining Landmarks of Haysboro," November 27, 1927

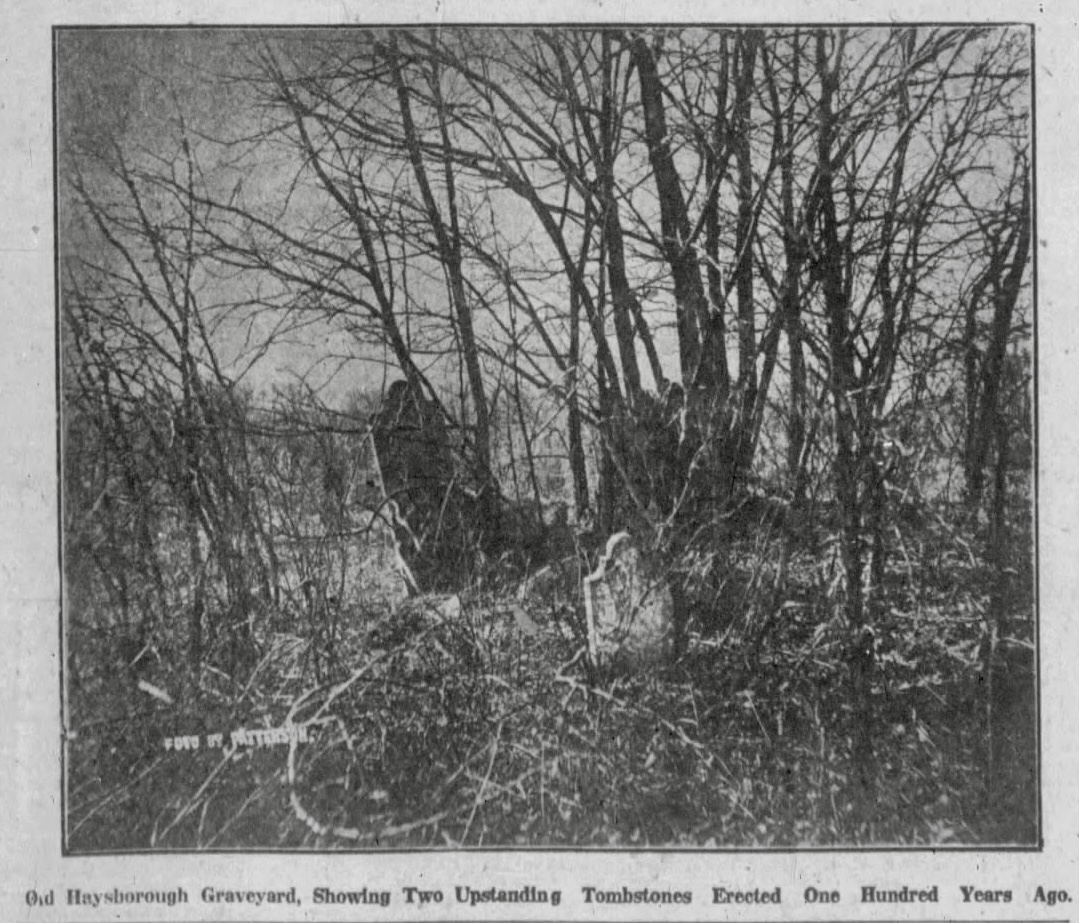
"Old Haysborough, Nashville's Earliest Competitor" Nashville Banner, February 10, 1912

Haysborough, Tennessee, originally Fort Union, also spelled Haysboro, is an extinct settlement of the United States that was founded around 1780 and was abandoned within 100 years. Haysborough was located "about seven miles from Nashville, on the Gallatin pike...on the Cumberland. A two-story frame building called the Haysborough tavern, a blacksmith shop, a grocery and some cabins made the town."

== History ==
Haysborough was Fort Union when middle Tennessee was still known as the Cumberland District of North Carolina. Haysborough was established around 1780 by the pioneer Hays family. Col. Robert Hays later married one of the daughters of John Donelson. Rachel Robards may have lived with this sister during an interlude in her troubled marriage to Lewis Robards. The Tennessee state legislature passed "An Act to establish a town by the name of Haysborough, on a north bluff of the Cumberland river in Davidson county" in 1799.

In the late 18th and early 19th centuries, ferries for crossing the Cumberland "could be had on either side of the river day or night. These ferries were owned by Oliver Johnson. Later Francis Prince and Richard Boyd bought them in 1806. Robt. Mately surveyed them and moved them, so as to be nearer and more convenient to Haysborough. At this time Haysborough was a wide awake little place." According to an 1884 history, "[Andrew] Jackson received his mail from here, and in some of his letters he speaks of meeting friends on the streets of Haysborough. The general and many of the Nashville people visited there often. Now as a town it exists only in written records, or in the minds of old residents of Nashville, who probably can recall it with memories of a gala day. The young men of Nashville would charter a keel boat—for that was before the day of steamboats—and, loading it with Nashville boys and girls, would sail away to Haysborough."

Three stagecoach lines stopped at Haysborough in the 1830s. In 1834 the settlement reportedly had "a half dozen families." But when the Nashville and Gallatin Turnpike opened in 1839 and a "cut-off was made between the Williams farm section and the present Amqui...Haysboro [became] a stranger to succeeding generations."

== See also ==
- History of Nashville, Tennessee
- Timeline of Nashville, Tennessee
- Fort Nashborough
- Mansker's Station
