= Bowen–Campbell House =

Historic house in Tennessee, United States

- U.S. National Register of Historic Places
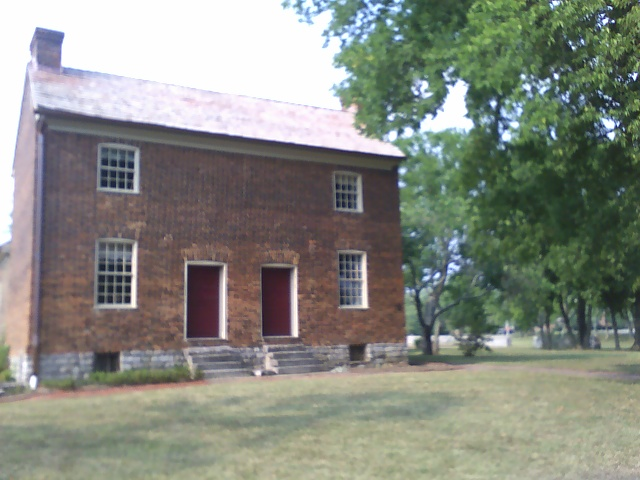
- The Bowen–Campbell House in 2007

- Location within Tennessee Location within the United States
- Interactive map showing the location of Bowen-Campbell House
- Location: 705 Caldwell Drive; Goodlettsville, Tennessee 37072
- Nearest city: Goodlettsville, Tennessee
- Coordinates: 36.3236°N 86.6895°W
- Built: 1788
- Architect: William Bowen
- NRHP reference No.: 77001295
- Added to NRHP: July 25, 1977

The Bowen–Campbell House, also known as the Bowen Plantation House, is a two-story, Federal style, brick house located in Goodlettsville, Sumner County, Tennessee.

== Overview ==
The house was built from 1787 to 1788 by Captain William Bowen, a veteran of Lord Dunmore's War of 1774, the French and Indian War of 1754 to 1763, and the American Revolutionary War who brought his family to the area in 1785. His son, William Russell Bowen, later lived in the house. His grandson, Brigadier General William Bowen Campbell who served as Governor of Tennessee from 1851 to 1853 and U.S. Congressman from Tennessee from 1837 to 1843, was born in the house in 1807.

It is the oldest brick house in Middle Tennessee. The brick masons were imported from Lexington, Kentucky. The original plantation area around the house is now the home of Moss-Wright Park. The Bowen–Campbell House Association as well as the Tennessee Historical Commission, restored the house in 1976. In 1977, the structure was placed on the National Register of Historic Places. Archeologists found the family cemetery on the property in 1995 and restored it in 1996. It is open for tours as part of Historic Mansker's Station.

== See also ==
- List of the oldest buildings in Tennessee
