= Mansker's Station =

Pre-statehood Tennessee blockhouse

Coordinates: 36.3231°N 86.6905°W

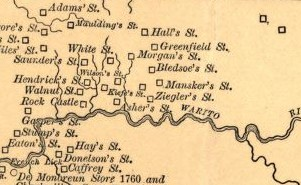
Map showing the location of several late-18th century frontier forts (or "stations") in Middle Tennessee.

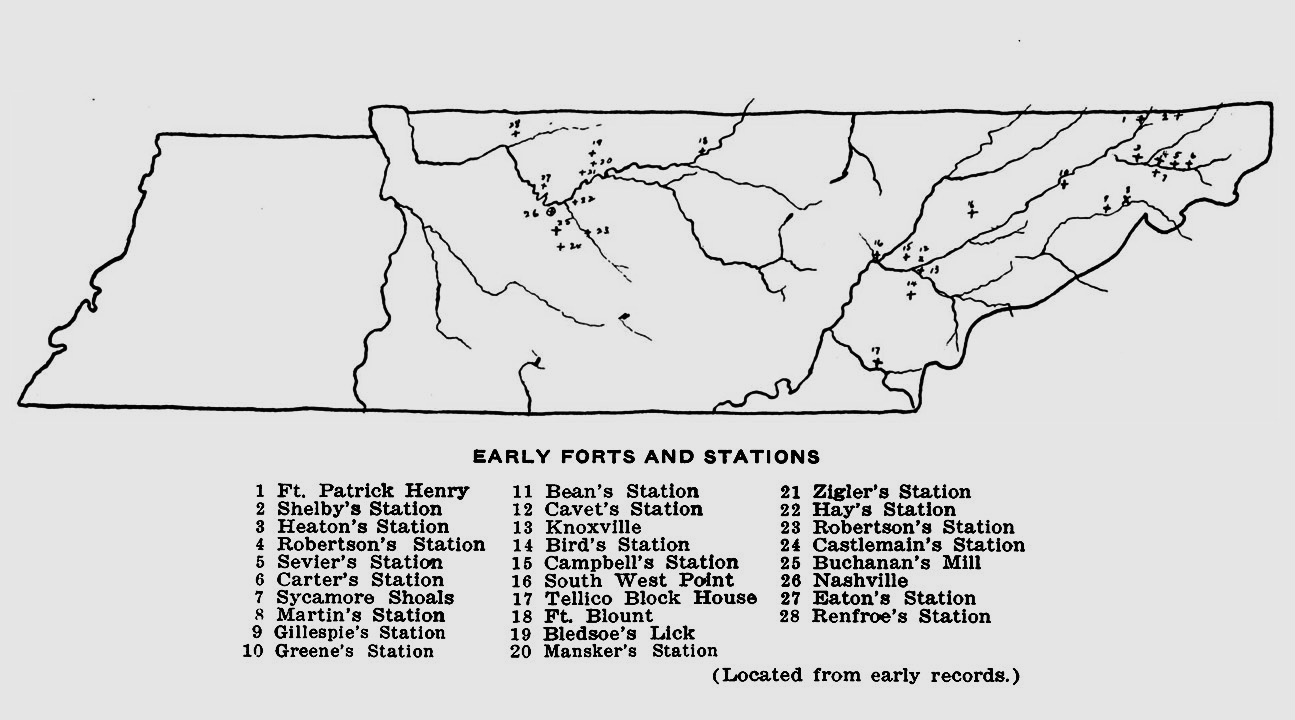
Early forts and stations of Tennessee

Mansker's Station, also called Mansker's Fort was a station along Avery's Trace in Middle Tennessee. It was built by Kasper Mansker.

Kasper Mansker was a long hunter and explorer from the Virginia area. After his first expedition into the wilderness in 1769, Mansker explored and hunted widely in the area along the Cumberland River in Middle Tennessee and Kentucky.

Mansker's station was a log fort that protected travelers along the road from Indian attacks. Mansker first built the fort along Mansker Creek in 1780, near Goodlettsville, after Fort Nashborough was built at the current site of Nashville.

Because of the danger from the Indian wars, Mansker and the people living there abandoned the station and moved to Fort Nashborough in 1781. Two men who returned for possessions the next day were killed, and the original fort was burned down. However, Mansker returned to the area in 1783 and built a bigger fort about one mile from the original site where he lived with his wife Elizabeth. Because it was able to accommodate more men, the larger fort was easier to defend against attack.

A number of notable travelers boarded at the station from 1780 to the early 1790s. These included Captain William Bowen, General Daniel Smith, Isaac Bledsoe, Andrew Jackson, John Overton and French botanist André Michaux.

== See also ==
- Fort Nashborough
- Haysborough, Tennessee
- Timeline of Nashville, Tennessee
