= Robert Hays (Tennessee) =

Tennessee settler (c. 1758–1819)

Robert Hays (c. 1758 – September 15, 1819) was a pioneer settler of Tennessee, United States. He served as a lieutenant in the American Revolutionary War and was an original member of the Society of the Cincinnati from North Carolina. Hays was granted land in Tennessee for his war service, settling on the Cumberland River just north of present-day Nashville. In 1786 he married Jane Donelson, a daughter of John Donelson. Through this marriage he was to become a brother-in-law of his neighbor, future president Andrew Jackson. He officiated the (re)marriage of Jackson and his sister-in-law Rachel in 1794. The same year Hays represented Davidson County in the North Carolina state legislature.

He co-led the Coldwater Expedition against the Cherokee and the Creeks in 1787. He established the now-extinct settlement of Haysborough.

Through the 1790s, Hays was an officer in the Mero District militia: lieutenant colonel of cavalry, muster master, and lieutenant colonel commandant by 1797. In 1795 he and his brother-in-law Stockley Donelson, and four others were on a "committee to cut and clear out a good wagon road, and to pay 200 pounds to those holding the lottery for building a jail in the Mero District." In 1795 Hays escorted a delegation of Chickasaw chiefs to Philadelphia to meet with George Washington. According to the editors of volume one of The Papers of Andrew Jackson, "Jackson was responsible through congressional patronage" for the appointment of Hays to the position of U.S. Marshal for west Tennessee in 1797. James White and Willie Blount signed $20,000 bonds in security for the new marshal. Hays served until 1804 when he was replaced by John Childress.

In January 1805 he was a signatory to a petition protesting the court-martial of Thomas Butler, probably produced at the behest of Andrew Jackson and sent to Thomas Jefferson's government, recorded in official state papers under the title "Disobedience of Orders Justified on the Grounds of Illegality." In August 1805 he was present at a Nashville dinner in honor of Aaron Burr and toasted to "the union of all honest men."

In March 1807, Andrew Jackson purchased 15 slaves at a sheriff's auction of the property of Hays, his neighbor and brother-in-law. Jackson then conveyed those 15 slaves back to Hays' wife Jane Donelson Hays. In 1807 Hays had recently declared bankruptcy, and during the 1828 U.S. presidential campaign this action was alleged to be a conspiracy intended to defraud Hays' creditors, essentially money laundering enslaved assets.

== Personal life ==
There were eight children from the Hays–Donelson marriage, six of whom survived to adulthood: Stockley Donelson Hays who married Lydia Butler: Martha (Patsy) Hays who married Dr. William E. Butler; Samuel Jackson Hays, who married Frances Middleton; Rachel Hays, who married Robert Butler; Narcissa Hays, who never married; and Elizabeth Hays, who married Col. Robert I. Chester. Mary S. Hays died at Nashville in 1815 at age 18.

Jane Donelson Hays died in 1834 and is believed to be buried in Riverside Cemetery in Jackson, Tennessee.

== See also ==
- Wards of Andrew Jackson
- Robards–Donelson–Jackson relationship controversy

== Sources ==
- Cheathem, Mark R. (2014). Andrew Jackson, Southerner. Baton Rouge, Louisiana: Louisiana State University Press. ISBN 978-0-8071-5099-3. LCCN 2012049695. OCLC 858995561. Project MUSE book 26506.
- Various; Jackson, Andrew (1980). Smith, Sam B.; Owsley, Harriet Chappell; Moser, Harold D. (eds.). The Papers of Andrew Jackson, Volume I, 1770–1803. Knoxville: University of Tennessee Press. ISBN 978-0-8704-9219-8. LCCN 79015078. OCLC 5029597.
- ———; ——— (1984). Moser, Harold D.; MacPherson, Sharon (eds.). The Papers of Andrew Jackson, Volume II, 1804–1813. University of Tennessee Press. doi:10.7290/utp3038. ISBN 978-0-8704-9441-3.
- ———; ——— (2002). Moser, Harold D.; Clifft, J. Clint; Wells, Wyatt (eds.). The Papers of Andrew Jackson, Volume VI, 1825–1828. University of Tennessee Press. doi:10.7290/utp7151. ISBN 978-1-5723-3174-7.
- Everett, Grace (February 1944). "The Hays Family". The Jackson Sun. Madison County Historical Society.
  - Chapter I: John Donelson and the Adventure -February 13, 1944
  - Chapter II: Rachel Donelson and Andrew Jackson, Jane Donelson Hays - February 14, 1944
  - Chapter III: Stockley Donelson Hays, Andrew Jackson, and the Burr conspiracy - February 15, 1944.
  - Chapter IV: Stockley Donelson Hays, Natchez Expedition, Nashville Inn fight with the Benton brothers - February 16, 1944.
  - Chapter V: Stockley Donelson Hays, settlement of Madison County, later life and death of Jane Donelson Hays - February 17, 1944
  - Chapter VI: Samuel Jackson Hays - February 18, 1944
  - Chapter VII: Samuel Jackson Hays, Middleton Hays, Richard Jackson Hays - February 20, 1944
  - Chapter VIII: Richard Jackson Hays, conclusion and source listing - February 21, 1944
