= Hunter's Hill plantation =

Plantation owned by Andrew Jackson 1796–1804

Coordinates: 36.240°N 86.598°W

Hunter's Hill was a plantation owned by Andrew Jackson in Tennessee, United States. Jackson, who was elected the seventh president of the United States in 1828, owned Hunter's Hill from 1796 to 1804.

== History ==
The land, originally granted to Jackson's wife's ex-husband Lewis Robards, was purchased by Jackson for $700 in 1796 from John Shannon of Kentucky. According to biographer Robert V. Remini, "This was the property Robards had purchased to begin his married life with Rachel but which he was unable to occupy because of the Indian menace." Jackson had a whiskey still on this property. He also had a small general store at Hunter's Hill where "from a narrow window" he sold trade goods and supplies to local Indigenous people and settlers. Jackson sold Hunter's Hill to Edward Ward in 1804 to pay outstanding debts. Later the same year he purchased the first 420 acres of The Hermitage.

== See also ==
- Andrew Jackson's plantations in northern Alabama
- Halcyon Plantation
