= Thomas Swann (fl. 1806) =

Virginia lawyer caned by Andrew Jackson

Thomas Swann (before 1828) is a minor figure of American history who is known for his role in the lead-up to the fatal 1806 duel between Andrew Jackson and Charles Dickinson. He took the side of the party of Dickinson and his father-in-law Joseph Erwin, and in due course Jackson beat him with a cane at a Nashville, Tennessee tavern. Little is known of him before or after this moment on the stage but he may have been killed in Mexico (at a date unknown).

== Early life ==
He was from a prominent family in Powhatan County, Virginia. Swann was said to be a graduate of the College of William and Mary in Williamsburg. He reportedly arrived in Nashville with a "letter of introduction to Jackson's neighbor Edward Ward."

== Nashville ==
During the lead-up to the 1806 Jackson–Dickinson duel, which began as a smouldering squabble about promissory notes in payment for a horse-race forfeit fee, "Swann published a provocative letter in the local newspaper, the Impartial Review, or Cumberland Repository, raising subtle distinctions between what Jackson had said and others had construed with regard to the notes." Historian Bertram Wyatt-Brown sets the scene thusly: "The principals in the dispute had their cliques of hangers-on, militia cronies, and personal aides. One of them was Thomas Swann...who served the Erwin–Dickinson leaders as a general factotum, gathering news, running errands, and canvassing during elections." Jackson replied, calling both Swann and Dickinson cowardly poltroons; Dickinson replied in turn describing Jackson as an incoherent equivocator and also a coward in a letter that Jackson did not even read before Swann issued a duel challenge to Jackson (delivered by Nathaniel McNairy), which message began, "Think not that I am to be intimidated by your threats."

Jackson did not deem Swann worthy of a duel but the following day, January 13, 1806, Jackson and John Coffee found him at Winn's Tavern. In the recounting of Andrew Burstein in The Passions of Andrew Jackson, "According to Coffee's later affidavit, Jackson landed 'a very severe blow,' and Swann 'appeared to stagger forward.' Jackson stumbled as he lunged at Swann a second time, and both men went for their pistols. Jackson was quicker, and Swann 'withdrew his hand,' unwilling to let the drama play out." In James Armstrong's 1828 telling, "Jackson appears with several men—the moment Swan appeared at the dinner table, Jackson fell on him with his stick—Swan threw him off into the fireplace—the General's friends soon relieved him, and then Jackson drew his big pistol and told Swan to defend himself—Swan replied he was unarmed and they were parted." As a result of this fracas, John Coffee and Nathaniel McNairy dueled in Kentucky (across the Tennessee state line, because dueling was illegal in Tennessee) on March 1, 1806. Coffee was slightly injured.

Meanwhile, according to the editors of The Papers of Andrew Jackson, "Each presented his side of the argument in the Impartial Review, Swann on February 1 and Jackson on February 15, after which Swann was nearly forgotten as the focus shifted to Dickinson. Determined not to accept his humiliation quietly, Swann published in the Impartial Review, May 24, half a dozen letters from prominent Virginians, testifying to his character as a gentleman." On September 12, 1806, judge John Overton, Jackson's longtime friend and eventual political promoter, heard a rumor that Jackson had shot and killed Swann, and wrote him from Jonesborough, Tennessee, with something of a frantic tone, admonishing him, "I do not know that there is much danger of any of these flies infesting you, though fear tho. for their wile is good—and this you may in a measure know from the reports that are industriously circulated—I repeat it again general the respect you owe to the opinion of your friends, the duties you owe to your family, and to the world, forbids the idea of your putting yourself upon a footing with boys, especially when they are made the instruments of others."

== After the duel ==
In 1811, Willie Blount ran unopposed for governor of Tennessee but Swann pulled 15 votes in Davidson County.

Swann reportedly married a girl from Gallatin, Tennessee.

== Death ==
Swann reportedly went to Mexico and there came to some sort of bad end. In 1828, Tennessee state judge Nathaniel Washington Williams listed "Thomas Swan of Va. Attorney at Law (dead.)," as one of the people who were in a ballroom in Nashville while Aaron Burr was burned in effigy during the Burr conspiracy backlash. John Gray Blount and "Judge Porter of Louisiana" were also listed as being present on that occasion.

== "Swann skins" ==
Some 15 years before the caning, in July 1790, James Cole Montflorence of Tennessee sent Jackson a letter "please to account with Capt Anthony Hart for the Little Venture of Swann Skins which you were so obliging to take down to the Natchez for me." The capitalization and double N in Montflorence's "Swann" are notable because of an ongoing controversy about the nature of this shipment. Historian Harriet Chappell Owsley asserted these were feathers or down stuffing for pillows and mattresses, but other scholars believe Montflorence described a shipment of slaves.

== See also ==
- List of violent incidents involving Andrew Jackson

== Sources ==
- Burstein, Andrew (2003). The Passions of Andrew Jackson. New York: Alfred A. Knopf. ISBN 978-0-3754-1428-2. LCCN 2002016258. OCLC 49385944.
- Cheathem, Mark R. (2014). Andrew Jackson, Southerner. Baton Rouge, Louisiana: Louisiana State University Press. ISBN 978-0-8071-5099-3. LCCN 2012049695. OCLC 858995561. Project MUSE book 26506.
- Drew, Bettina Lee (December 2001). Master Andrew Jackson: Indian Removal and the Culture of Slavery (Thesis). Yale University. UMI 3030759. ProQuest 3030759
- Jackson, Andrew (1984). Moser, Harold; Macpherson, Sharon (eds.). The Papers of Andrew Jackson, Volume II, 1804-1813. University of Tennessee Press. doi:10.7290/utp3038. ISBN 978-0-87049-441-3.
- Owsley, Harriet Chappell (Winter 1977). "The Marriages of Rachel Donelson". Tennessee Historical Quarterly. 36 (4). Nashville, Tennessee: Tennessee Historical Society: 479–492. ISSN 0040-3261. JSTOR 42625784. OCLC 551288487.
- Remini, Robert V. (Summer 1991). "Andrew Jackson's Adventures on the Natchez Trace". Southern Quarterly. 29 (4). Hattiesburg, Mississippi: University of Southern Mississippi: 35–42. ISSN 0038-4496. OCLC 1644229.
- Wyatt-Brown, Bertram (Spring 1997). "Andrew Jackson's Honor". Journal of the Early Republic. 17 (1): 1. doi:10.2307/3124641.
