= Marriage bond =

Archaic type of surety bond

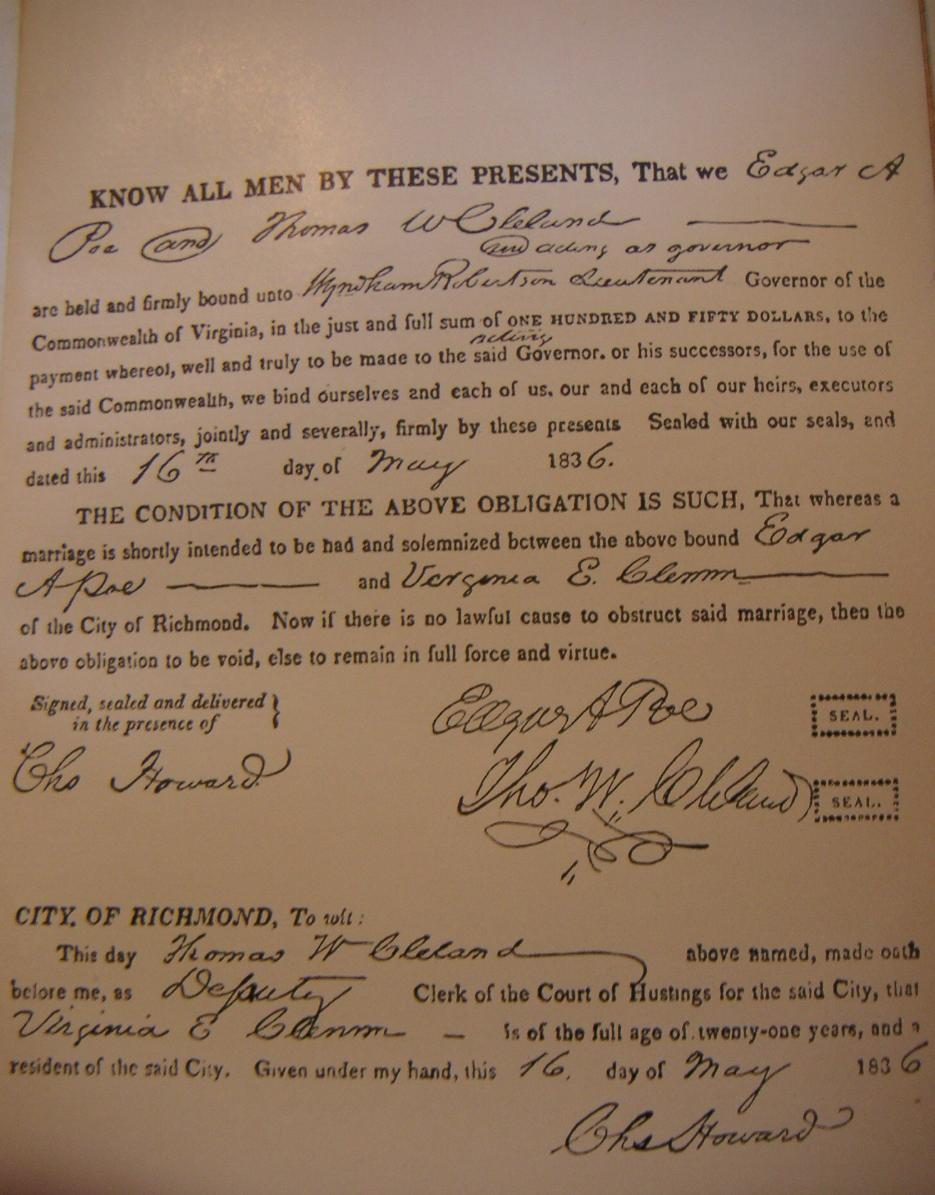
1836 marriage bond of Edgar Allan Poe and Virginia Eliza Clemm Poe

A marriage bond was a type of surety bond guaranteeing that two people were legally available to marry each other free, of complications like being legally underage, of having too close a genetic relationship,or of having other extant marriages, etc. A marriage bond is legally distinct from a marriage license or a marriage certificate, although all three types of records are used in genealogical research as evidence of marriage. Marriage bonds are also not to be confused with marriage contracts or prenuptial agreements. Marriage banns were similar in practice although usually lacked the explicit financial guarantees. The person who co-signed the marriage bond was called the guarantor, security, bondsman or surety, and was often a relative of the prospective groom or bride. Most marriage bonds have an amount of money listed but "no money literally changed hands at the time of posting the bond" rather that was a penalty amount "if an impediment to the marriage was found." The dates of marriage bonds may not (and likely do not) correlate with the actual date the marriage was performed. In some cases a bond document exists but no actual wedding ever took place.

Marriage bonds were used in Great Britain and colonial North America. In parts of Great Britain, those who wanted to circumvent a reading of the banns for the traditional three weeks could apply for a marriage license, which required an allegation of legality and/or a bond. The use of marriage bonds in many British counties ended in 1823. Upper and Lower Canada required marriage bonds if the wedding was to be performed by someone other than a Catholic or Anglican officiant. Some southern and mid-Atlantic U.S. states carried the colonial practice of using marriage bonds forward into the mid-1800s. Knox County, Tennessee had a $1250 required surety until 1929.

Marriage by bond occurred in Spanish colonial Texas. In this case the bond surety was a guarantee that a couple would be legally married, as was required by law, by a Catholic priest when one visited nearby or when the couple traveled to a settlement with an established church. Thus, marriage records in early Texas sometimes have a notation to the effect of "previously married by bond" and/or may have two entries for the same couple: their bond-marriage date and their certified marriage date.
