= Andrew Jackson =

President of the United States from 1829 to 1837

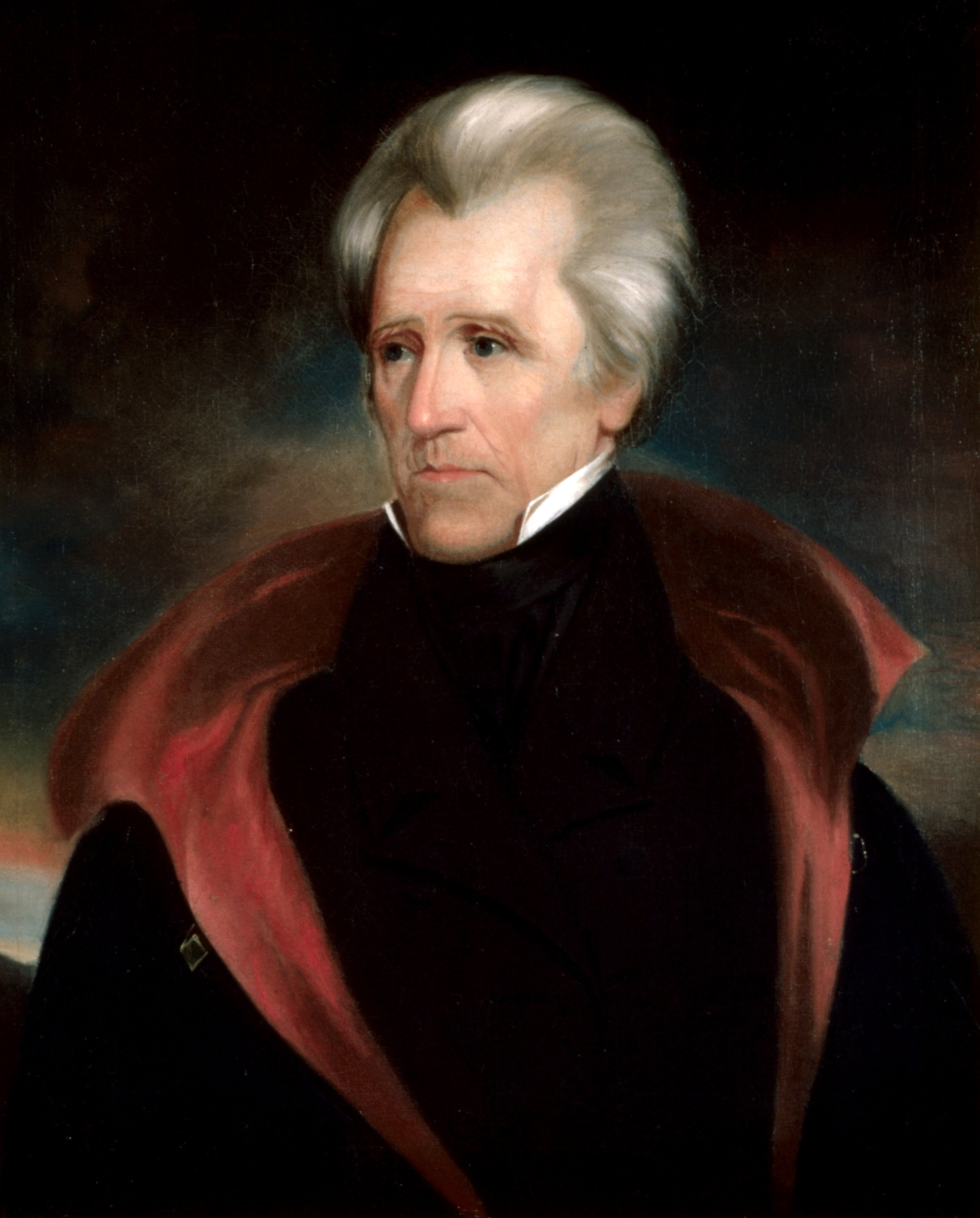
- Formal portrait, c. 1835

7th President of the United States
- In office March 4, 1829 – March 4, 1837
- Vice President: John C. Calhoun (1829–1832); Vacant (1832–1833) (Note: Vice President Calhoun resigned from office. As this was prior to the adoption of the Twenty-fifth Amendment in 1967, a vacancy in the office of vice president was not filled until the next ensuing election and inauguration.); Martin Van Buren (1833–1837)
- Preceded by: John Quincy Adams
- Succeeded by: Martin Van Buren

United States Senator from Tennessee
- In office March 4, 1823 – October 14, 1825
- Preceded by: John Williams
- Succeeded by: Hugh Lawson White
- In office September 26, 1797 – April 1, 1798
- Preceded by: William Cocke
- Succeeded by: Daniel Smith

Military Governor of Florida
- In office March 10, 1821 – December 31, 1821
- Appointed by: James Monroe
- Preceded by: José María Coppinger (Spanish East Florida); José María Callava (Spanish West Florida)
- Succeeded by: William Pope Duval (as Territorial Governor)

Justice of the Tennessee Superior Court
- In office June 1798 – June 1804
- Appointed by: John Sevier
- Preceded by: Howell Tatum
- Succeeded by: John Overton

Member of the U.S. House of Representatives from Tennessee's at-large district
- In office December 4, 1796 – September 26, 1797
- Preceded by: James White (Delegate from the Southwest Territory)
- Succeeded by: William C. C. Claiborne

Personal details
- Born: March 15, 1767 Waxhaw Settlement between North Carolina and South Carolina, British America
- Died: June 8, 1845 (aged 78) Nashville, Tennessee, U.S.
- Resting place: The Hermitage
- Party: Democratic-Republican (before 1825); Democratic (1828–1845)
- Spouse: Rachel Donelson (m. 1794; died 1828)
- Children: Andrew Jackson Jr. (adopted)
- Occupation: Politician; lawyer; general
- Awards: Congressional Gold Medal; Thanks of Congress

Military service
- Allegiance: United States
- Branch/service: United States Army
- Rank: Major general (U.S. Army); Major general (U.S. Volunteers); Major general (Tennessee militia)
- Unit: South Carolina Militia (1780–81); Tennessee Militia (1792–1821); United States Army (1814–1821)
- Battles/wars: See list: American Revolutionary War; Battle of Hanging Rock; Creek War; Battle of Talladega; Battles of Emuckfaw and Enotachopo Creek; Battle of Horseshoe Bend; War of 1812; Battle of Pensacola; Battle of New Orleans; First Seminole War; Capture of St. Marks; Siege of Fort Barrancas

Andrew Jackson (March 15, 1767 – June 8, 1845) was the seventh president of the United States from 1829 to 1837. He rose to fame as a U.S. Army general and served in both houses of the U.S. Congress. His political philosophy, which dominated his presidency, became the basis for the rise of Jacksonian democracy. His legacy is controversial: being praised as an advocate for white working Americans and preserving the union of states, and criticized for his racist policies, particularly towards Native Americans.

Born in the colonial Carolinas before the American Revolutionary War, Jackson became a frontier lawyer, married Rachel Donelson, and briefly represented Tennessee in both the U.S. House of Representatives and U.S. Senate. After resigning, he served as a Tennessee Superior Court justice from 1798 to 1804. He founded The Hermitage and became a wealthy planter who profited from the forced labor of hundreds of enslaved African Americans. As commander of the Tennessee militia, he led troops in the Creek War of 1813–1814, winning the Battle of Horseshoe Bend and negotiating the Treaty of Fort Jackson, which forced the indigenous Creek to cede vast tracts of the present day states of Alabama and Georgia. In the concurrent war against the British, Jackson's victory at the Battle of New Orleans in 1815 made him a national hero. He later commanded United States forces during the First Seminole War; his campaign was one of the factors that prompted Spain to negotiate the cession of Florida to the United States. Jackson briefly served as Florida's first territorial governor before returning to the Senate. He ran for president in 1824, winning a plurality of the popular and electoral vote. Because no candidate secured the electoral majority, the House of Representatives elected John Quincy Adams with the support of Henry Clay, who later joined Adams's cabinet. Jackson's supporters, who alleged that Adams and Clay had formed a "corrupt bargain", created a new political coalition that would become the Democratic Party.

Jackson ran again in 1828, defeating Adams in a landslide victory despite issues such as his slave trading and "irregular" marriage. In 1830, he signed the Indian Removal Act. This act, which has been described as ethnic cleansing, displaced tens of thousands of Native Americans from their ancestral homelands east of the Mississippi River. It resulted in thousands of deaths in what has become known as the Trail of Tears. Jackson faced a challenge to the integrity of the federal union when South Carolina threatened to nullify a high protective tariff set by the federal government. He threatened the use of military force to enforce the tariff, but the crisis was defused when it was amended. In 1832, he vetoed a bill by Congress to reauthorize the Second Bank of the United States, viewing the Bank as a branch of government run by the elite. After a lengthy struggle, the Bank was dismantled. In 1835, Jackson became the only U.S. president to pay off the national debt. After leaving office, he supported the presidencies of Martin Van Buren and James K. Polk, as well as the annexation of Texas.

Opinions about Jackson are often polarized. Supporters characterize him as a defender of democracy and the U.S. Constitution, while critics point to his reputation as a demagogue who ignored the law when it suited him. Scholarly rankings of U.S. presidents historically placed Jackson high in the ranking of presidents. In recent decades, his reputation has declined and his ranking has fallen.

== Early life ==
=== Childhood ===
Andrew Jackson was born on March 15, 1767, in the Waxhaws region of the Carolinas. His parents, Andrew Jackson and Elizabeth Hutchinson, were Scots-Irish Presbyterians, whose ancestors had crossed into northern Ireland from Scotland after the Battle of the Boyne in 1690. They emigrated from Ulster, Ireland, in 1765. Jackson had two older brothers who came with his parents from Ireland, Hugh (born 1763) and Robert (born 1764). Elizabeth had a strong hatred of the British that she passed on to her sons.

Jackson's exact birthplace is unclear. Jackson's father died at the age of 29 in February 1767, about three weeks before his son Andrew was born. Elizabeth and her three sons then moved in with her sister and brother-in-law, Jane and James Crawford. Jackson later stated that he was born on the Crawford plantation, which is in Lancaster County, South Carolina, but second-hand evidence suggests that he might have been born at another uncle's home in North Carolina.

When Jackson was young, Elizabeth believed he might pursue a career in the ministry and paid a local clergyman to tutor him. He learned to read, write, and work with numbers, and was exposed to Greek and Latin, but he was too strong-willed and hot-tempered for the ministry.

=== Revolutionary War ===
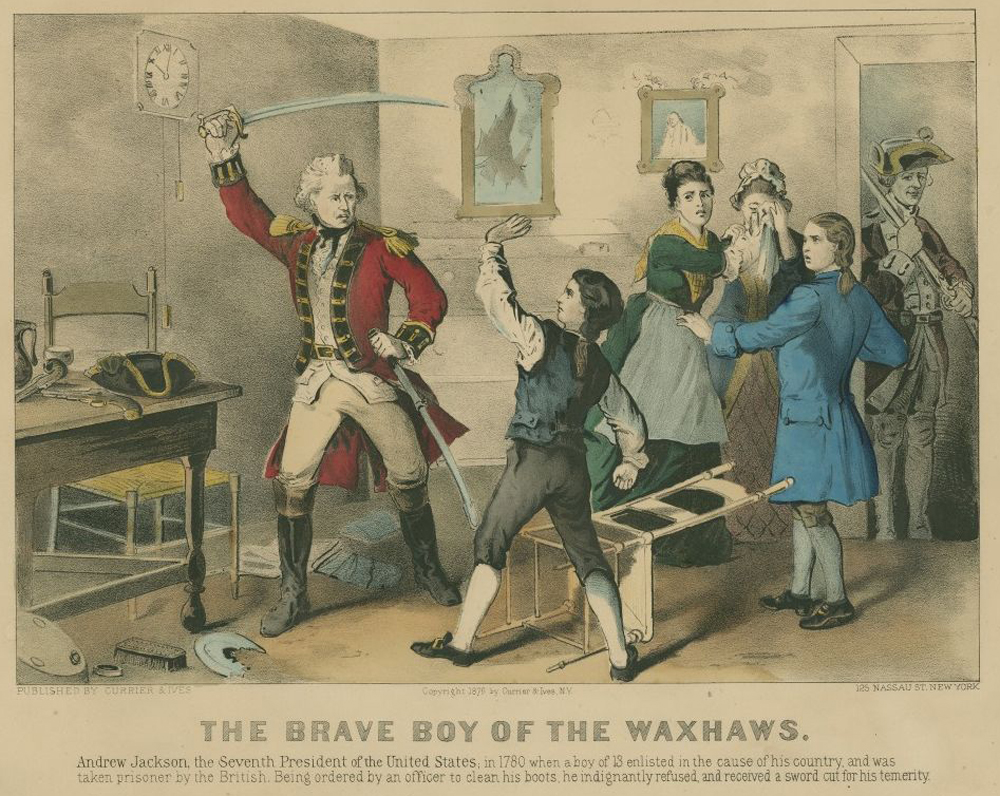
The Brave Boy of the Waxhaws, an 1876 Currier and Ives lithograph depicting the story of a young Andrew Jackson defending himself from a British officer during the American Revolutionary War

Jackson and his older brothers, Hugh and Robert, served on the Patriot side against British forces during the American Revolutionary War. Hugh, who served under Colonel William Richardson Davie, died from heat exhaustion after the Battle of Stono Ferry in June 1779. After anti-British sentiment intensified in the Southern Colonies following the Battle of Waxhaws in May 1780, Elizabeth encouraged Andrew and Robert to participate in militia drills. They served as couriers, and were present at the Battle of Hanging Rock in August 1780.

Andrew and Robert were captured in April 1781 when the British occupied the home of a Crawford relative. A British officer demanded to have his boots polished. Andrew refused, and the officer slashed him with a sword, leaving him with scars on his left hand and head. Robert also refused and was struck a blow on the head. The brothers were taken to a prisoner-of-war camp in Camden, South Carolina, where they became malnourished and contracted smallpox. In late spring, the brothers were released to their mother in a prisoner exchange. Robert died two days after arriving home, but Elizabeth was able to nurse Andrew back to health. Once he recovered, Elizabeth volunteered to nurse American prisoners of war housed in British prison ships in the harbor of Charleston, South Carolina. She contracted cholera and died soon afterwards. Her death made Jackson an orphan at age 14, and increased his hatred for the values he associated with Britain, in particular aristocracy and political privilege.

== Early career ==
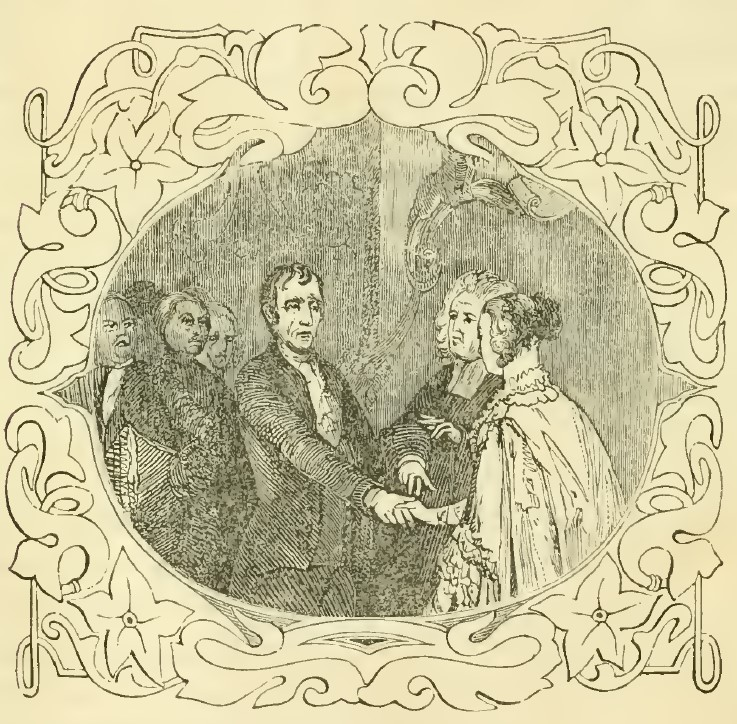
An 1846 wood engraving by William Croome depicting Jackson's marriage to Rachel Donelson in the 1847 Pictorial History of Andrew Jackson by John Frost

=== Legal career and marriage ===
After the American Revolutionary War, Jackson worked as a saddler, briefly returned to school, and taught reading and writing to children. In 1784, he left the Waxhaws region for Salisbury, North Carolina, where he studied law under attorney Spruce Macay. He completed his training under John Stokes, and was admitted to the North Carolina bar in September 1787. Shortly thereafter, his friend John McNairy helped him get appointed as a prosecuting attorney in the Western District of North Carolina, which would later become the state of Tennessee. While traveling to assume his new position, Jackson stopped in Jonesborough. While there, he bought his first slave, Nancy, who was around his age. He also fought his first duel, accusing another lawyer, Waightstill Avery, of impugning his character. The duel ended with both men firing in the air.

Jackson began his new career in the frontier town of Nashville in 1788 and quickly moved up in social status. He became a protégé of William Blount, one of the most powerful men in the territory. Jackson was appointed attorney general of the Mero District in 1791 and judge-advocate for the militia the following year. He also got involved in land speculation, eventually forming a partnership with fellow lawyer John Overton. Their partnership mainly dealt with claims made under a "land grab" act of 1783 that opened Cherokee (Tsalagi, ᏣᎳᎩ) and Chickasaw (Chikashsha) territory to North Carolina's white residents. Jackson also became a slave trader, transporting enslaved people for the interregional slave market between Nashville and the Natchez District of Spanish West Florida via the Mississippi River and the Natchez Trace.

While boarding at the home of Rachel Stockly Donelson, the widow of John Donelson, Jackson became acquainted with their daughter, Rachel Donelson Robards. The younger Rachel was in an unhappy marriage with Captain Lewis Robards, and the two were separated by 1789. After the separation, Jackson and Rachel became romantically involved, living together as husband and wife. Robards petitioned for divorce, which was granted in 1793 on the basis of Rachel's infidelity. The couple legally married in January 1794. In 1796, they acquired a plantation, Hunter's Hill, on 640 acres (260 ha) of land near Nashville.

=== Early public career ===
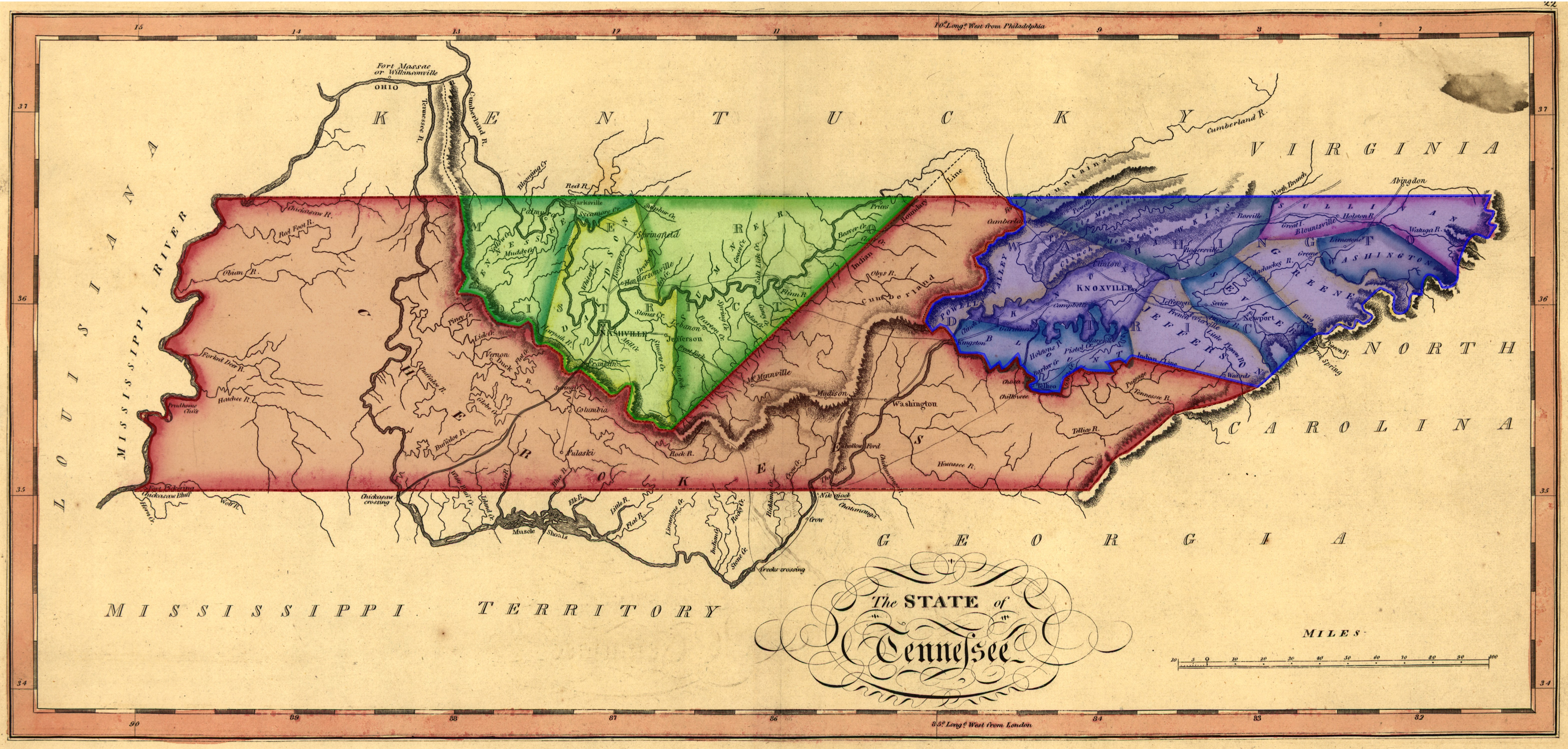
Tennessee c. 1810. The eastern counties shaded in blue, the Mero District in green, and Native American lands in red. The Natchez Trace from its northern terminus to Chickasaw Crossing where it leaves the state is shaded in gray.

Jackson became a member of the Democratic-Republican Party, the dominant party in Tennessee. He was elected as a delegate to the Tennessee constitutional convention in 1796. When Tennessee achieved statehood that year, he was elected to be its U.S. representative. During his 10 months in Congress, Jackson argued against the Jay Treaty, criticized George Washington for allegedly removing Democratic-Republicans from public office, and joined several other Democratic-Republican congressmen in voting against a resolution of thanks for Washington. He advocated for the right of Tennesseans to militarily oppose Native American interests. The state legislature elected him to be a U.S. senator in 1797, but he resigned after serving only six months.

In early 1798, Governor John Sevier appointed Jackson to be a judge of the Tennessee Superior Court. In 1802, he also became major general, or commander, of the Tennessee militia, a position that was determined by a vote of the militia's officers. The vote was tied between Jackson and Sevier, a popular Revolutionary War veteran and former governor, but the governor, Archibald Roane, broke the tie in Jackson's favor. Jackson later accused Sevier of fraud and bribery. Sevier responded by impugning his wife, Rachel Jackson's, honor, resulting in a shootout on a public street. Soon afterwards, they met to duel, but parted without having fired at each other.

=== Planting career and slavery ===
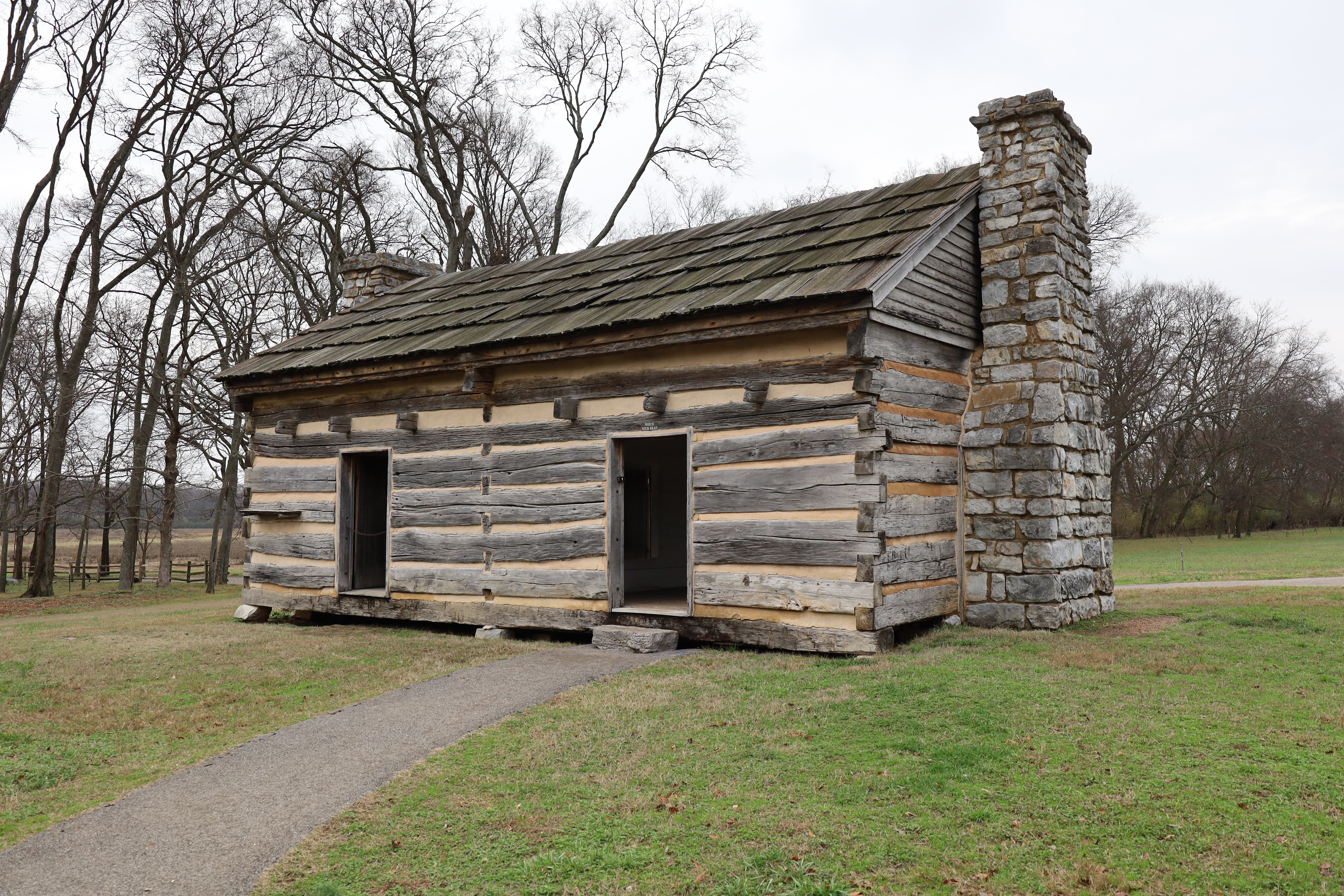
One of the original slave quarters at the Hermitage

Jackson resigned his judgeship in 1804. He had almost gone bankrupt when the land and mercantile speculations he had made on the basis of promissory notes fell apart in the wake of the Panic of 1796–1797. He had to sell Hunter's Hill, as well as 25,000 acres (10,000 ha) of land he purchased for speculation, and bought a smaller 425-acre (172 ha) plantation near Nashville that he would call the Hermitage. He focused on recovering from his losses by becoming a successful planter and merchant. The Hermitage grew to 1,000 acres (400 ha), making it one of the largest cotton-growing plantations in the state.

Like most planters in the Southern United States, Jackson used slave labor. In 1804, Jackson had nine African American slaves; by 1820, he had over 100; and by his death in 1845, he had over 150. Over his lifetime, he owned a total of 300 slaves. Jackson subscribed to the paternalistic idea of slavery, which claimed that slave ownership was morally acceptable as long as slaves were treated with humanity and their basic needs were cared for. In practice, slaves were treated as a form of wealth whose productivity needed to be protected. Jackson directed harsh punishment for slaves who disobeyed or ran away. For example, in an 1804 advertisement to recover a runaway slave, he offered "ten dollars extra, for every hundred lashes any person will give him" up to three hundred lashes—a number that would likely have been fatal. Over time, his accumulation of wealth in both slaves and land placed him among the elite families of Tennessee.

=== Duel with Dickinson ===
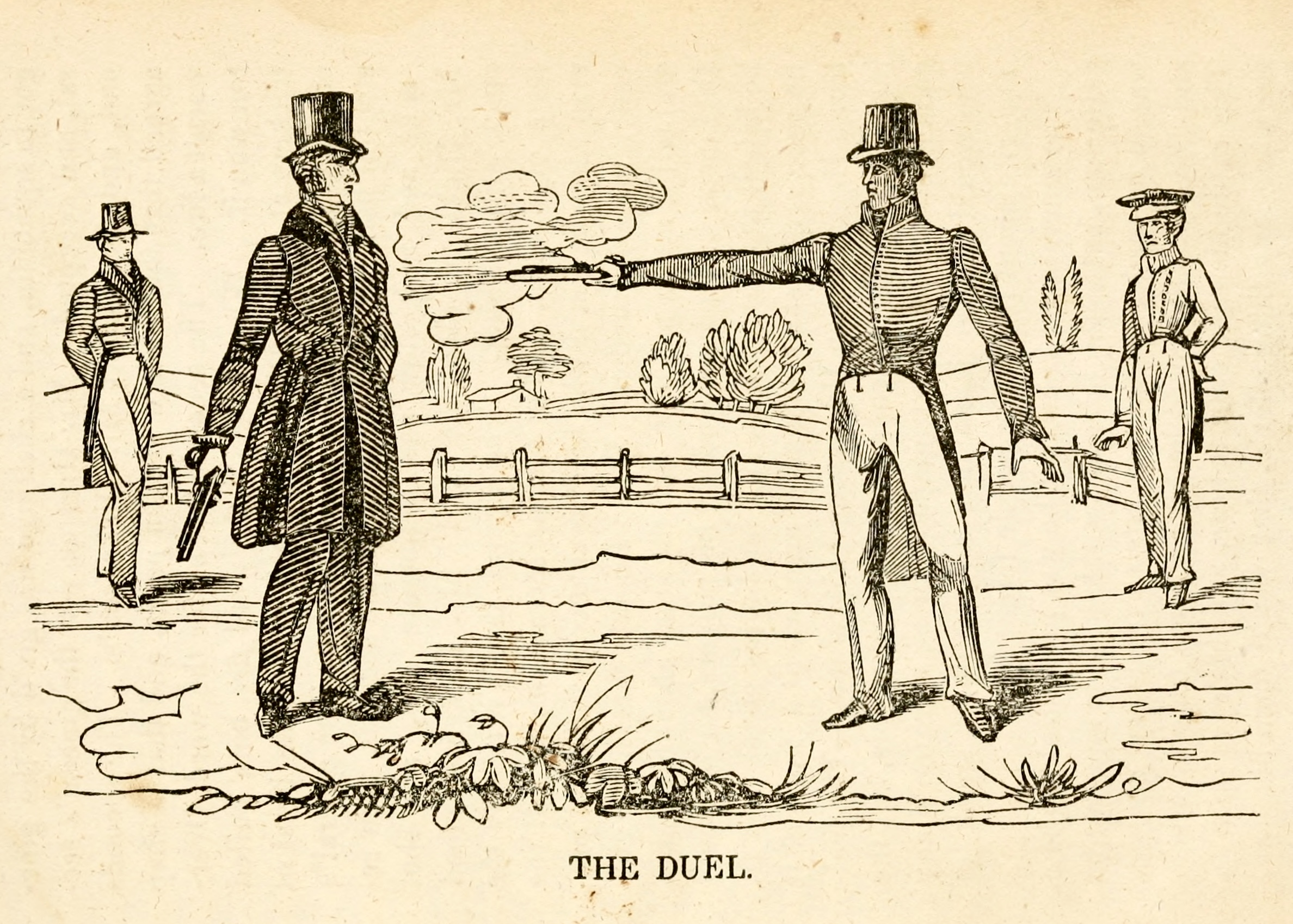
An 1834 woodcut depicting Jackson's duel with Charles Dickinson from the satirical Major Jack Downing's Life of Andrew Jackson. Downing was a fictional character created by Seba Smith to parody Jackson.

In May 1806, Jackson fought a duel with Charles Dickinson. Their dispute started over payments for a forfeited horse race, escalating for six months until they agreed to the duel. Dickinson fired first. The bullet hit Jackson in the chest, but shattered against his breastbone. He returned fire and killed Dickinson. The killing tarnished Jackson's reputation. In the following year, Jackson was indicted with a charge of assault with intent to kill Samuel Dorsey Jackson, with whom he had business and social relations, in an alleged cane stabbing, though he was acquitted.

=== Adventure with Burr ===
Jackson became involved in former vice president Aaron Burr's plan to conquer Spanish Florida and drive the Spanish from Texas. Burr, who was touring what was then the Western United States after mortally wounding Alexander Hamilton in a duel, stayed with the Jacksons at the Hermitage in 1805. He eventually persuaded Jackson to join his adventure. In October 1806, Jackson wrote James Winchester that the United States "can conquer not only [Florida], but all Spanish North America". He informed the Tennessee militia that it should be ready to march at a moment's notice "when the government and constituted authority of our country require it", and agreed to provide boats and provisions for the expedition. Jackson sent a letter to President Thomas Jefferson telling him that Tennessee was ready to defend the nation's honor.

Jackson also expressed uncertainty about the enterprise. He warned Louisiana Governor William Claiborne and Tennessee Senator Daniel Smith that some of the people involved in the adventure might be intending to break away from the United States. In December, Jefferson ordered Burr to be arrested for treason. Jackson, safe from arrest because of his extensive paper trail, organized the militia to capture the conspirators. He testified before a grand jury in 1807, implying that it was Burr's associate James Wilkinson who was guilty of treason, not Burr. Burr was acquitted.

== Military career ==
Military campaigns of Andrew Jackson
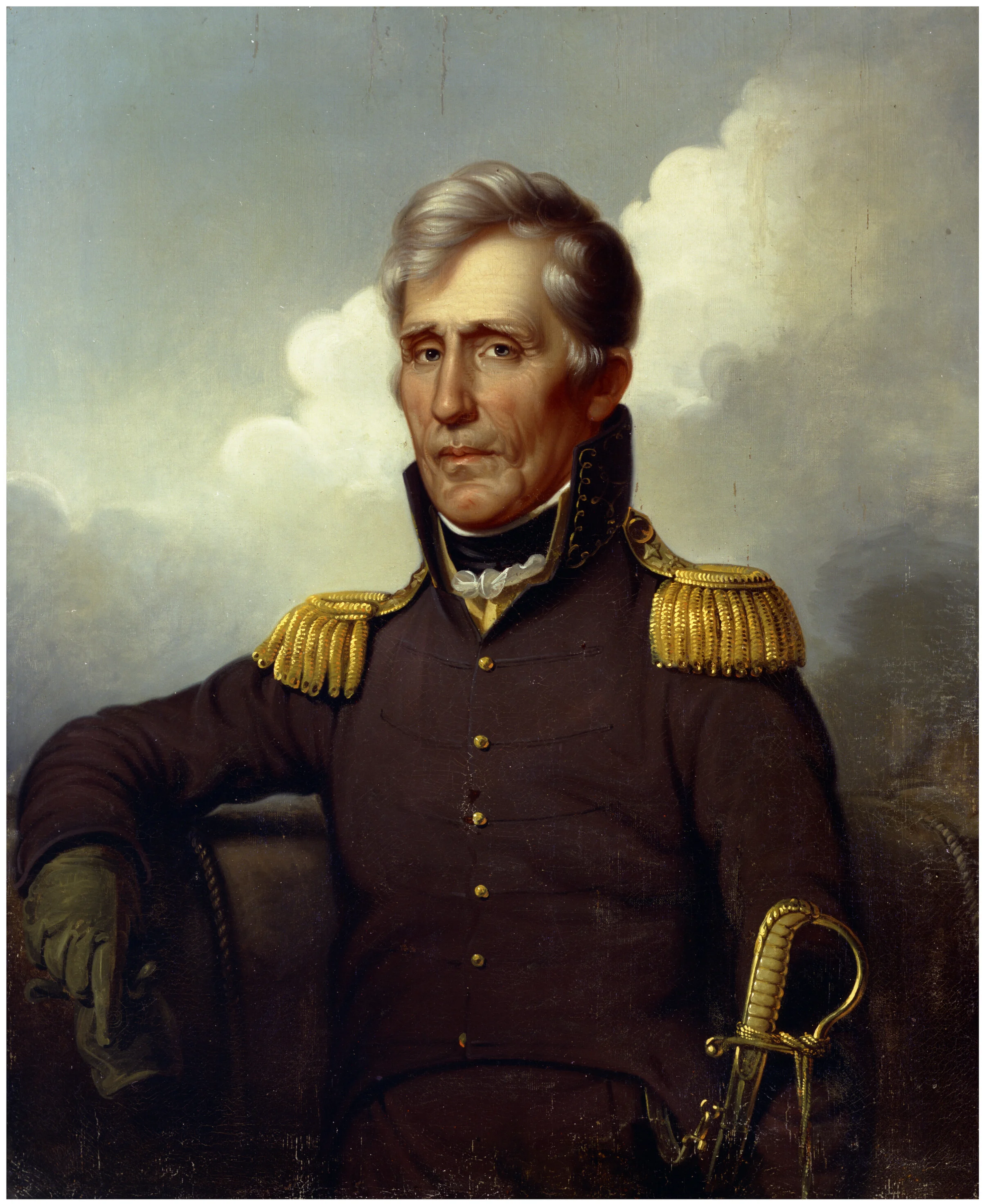
- Portrait of Jackson, painted by Rembrandt Peale in Washington, D.C. in 1819
- Creek War War of 1812 First Seminole War

=== War of 1812 ===
On June 18, 1812, the United States declared war on the United Kingdom, launching the War of 1812. Though the war was primarily caused by maritime issues, it provided white American settlers on the southern frontier the opportunity to overcome Native American resistance to settlement, undermine British support of the Native American tribes, and pry Florida from the Spanish Empire.

Jackson immediately offered to raise volunteers for the war, but he was not called to duty until after the United States military was repeatedly defeated in the American Northwest. After these defeats, in January 1813, Jackson enlisted over 2,000 volunteers, who were ordered to head to New Orleans to defend against a British attack. When his forces arrived at Natchez, they were ordered to halt by General Wilkinson, the commander at New Orleans and the man Jackson accused of treason after the Burr adventure. A little later, Jackson received a letter from the Secretary of War, John Armstrong, stating that his Natchez Expedition volunteers were not needed, and that they were to hand over any supplies to Wilkinson and disband. Jackson refused to disband his troops; instead, he led them on the difficult march back to Nashville, earning the nickname "Hickory" (later "Old Hickory") for his toughness.

After returning to Nashville, Jackson and three of his kinsmen, John Coffee, Stockley D. Hays, and Alexander Donelson, got into a tavern brawl over honor with the brothers Jesse and Thomas Hart Benton. Nobody was killed, but Jackson received a gunshot in the shoulder that nearly killed him.

==== Creek War ====
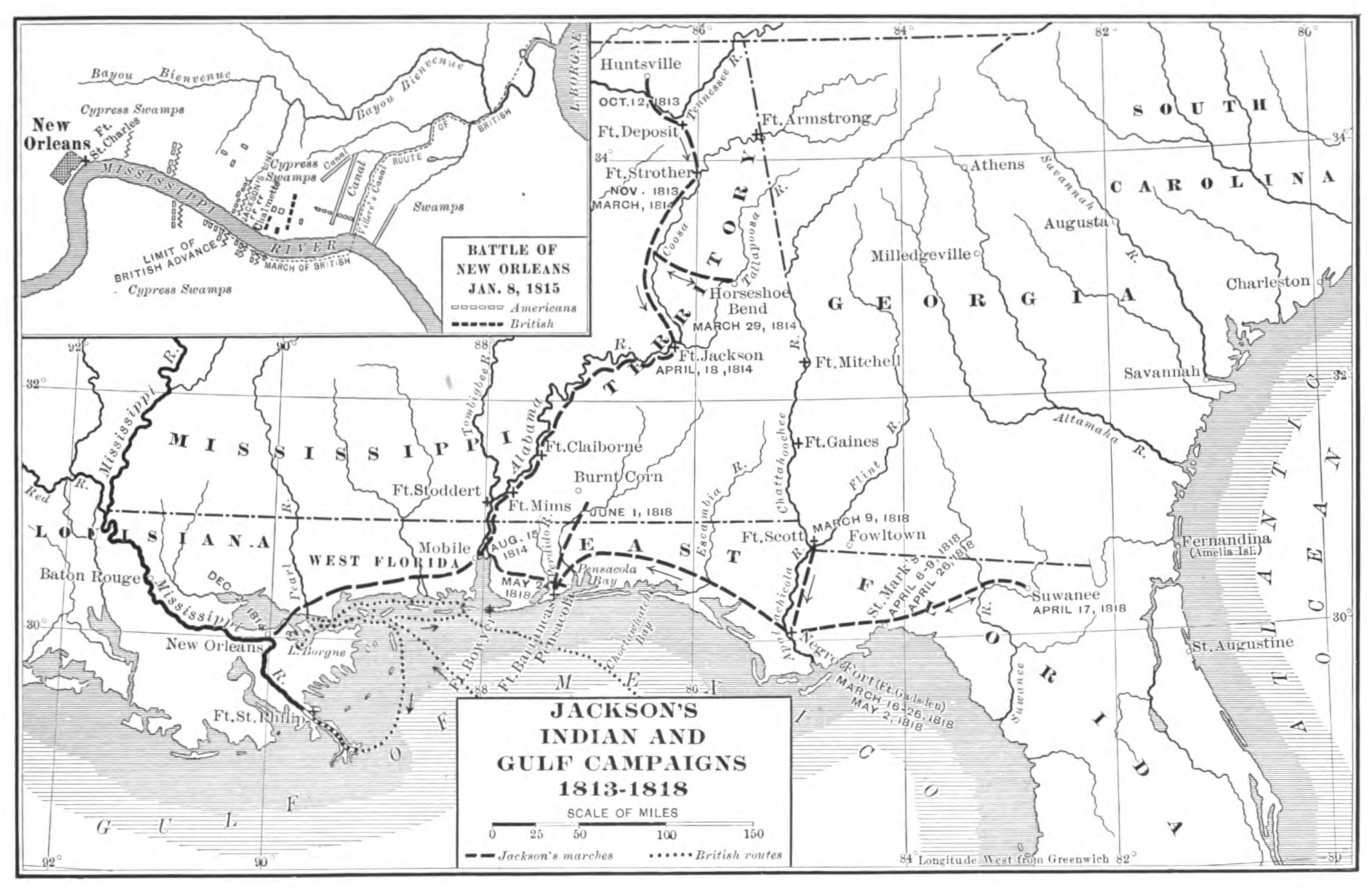
Andrew Jackson's Indian and Gulf campaigns, 1813–1818 (The American Nation, 1907)

Jackson had not fully recovered from his wounds when Governor Willie Blount called out the militia in September 1813 following the August Fort Mims Massacre. The Red Sticks, a Creek Confederacy faction that had allied with Tecumseh, a Shawnee chief who was fighting with the British against the United States, killed about 250 militia men and civilians at Fort Mims in retaliation for an ambush by American militia at Burnt Corn Creek.

Jackson's objective was to destroy the Red Sticks. He headed south from Fayetteville, Tennessee, in October with 2,500 militia, establishing Fort Strother as his supply base. He sent his cavalry under General Coffee ahead of the main force, destroying Red Stick villages and capturing supplies. Coffee defeated a band of Red Sticks at the Battle of Tallushatchee on November 3, and Jackson defeated another band later that month at the Battle of Talladega.

By January 1814, the expiration of enlistments and desertion had reduced Jackson's force by about 1,000 volunteers, but he continued the offensive. The Red Sticks counterattacked at the Battles of Emuckfaw and Enotachopo Creek. Jackson repelled them but was forced to withdraw to Fort Strother. Jackson's army was reinforced by further recruitment and the addition of a regular army unit, the 39th U.S. Infantry Regiment. The combined force of 3,000 men—including Cherokee, Choctaw (Chahta), and Creek allies—attacked a Red Stick fort at Horseshoe Bend on the Tallapoosa River, which was manned by about 1,000 men. The Red Sticks were overwhelmed and massacred. Almost all their warriors were killed, and nearly 300 women and children were taken prisoner and distributed to Jackson's Native American allies. The victory broke the power of the Red Sticks. Jackson continued his scorched-earth campaign of burning villages, destroying supplies, and starving Red Stick women and children. The campaign ended when William Weatherford, the Red Stick leader, surrendered, although some Red Sticks fled to East Florida.

On June 8, Jackson was appointed a brigadier general in the United States Army, and 10 days later was made a brevet major general with command of the Seventh Military District, which included Tennessee, Louisiana, the Mississippi Territory, and the Muscogee Creek Confederacy. With President James Madison's approval, Jackson imposed the Treaty of Fort Jackson. The treaty required all Creek, including those who had remained allies, to surrender 23,000,000 acres (9,300,000 ha) of land to the United States.

Jackson then turned his attention to the British and Spanish. He moved his forces to Mobile, Alabama, in August, accused the Spanish governor of West Florida, Mateo González Manrique, of arming the Red Sticks, and threatened to attack. The governor responded by inviting the British to land at Pensacola to defend it, which violated Spanish neutrality. The British attempted to capture Mobile, but their four warships were repulsed at Fort Bowyer. Jackson then entered Florida, defeating the Spanish and British forces at the Battle of Pensacola on November 7. Afterwards, the Spanish surrendered, and the British withdrew. Weeks later, Jackson learned that the British were planning an attack on New Orleans, which was the gateway to the Lower Mississippi River and control of the American West. He evacuated Pensacola, strengthened the garrison at Mobile, and led his troops to New Orleans.

==== Battle of New Orleans ====
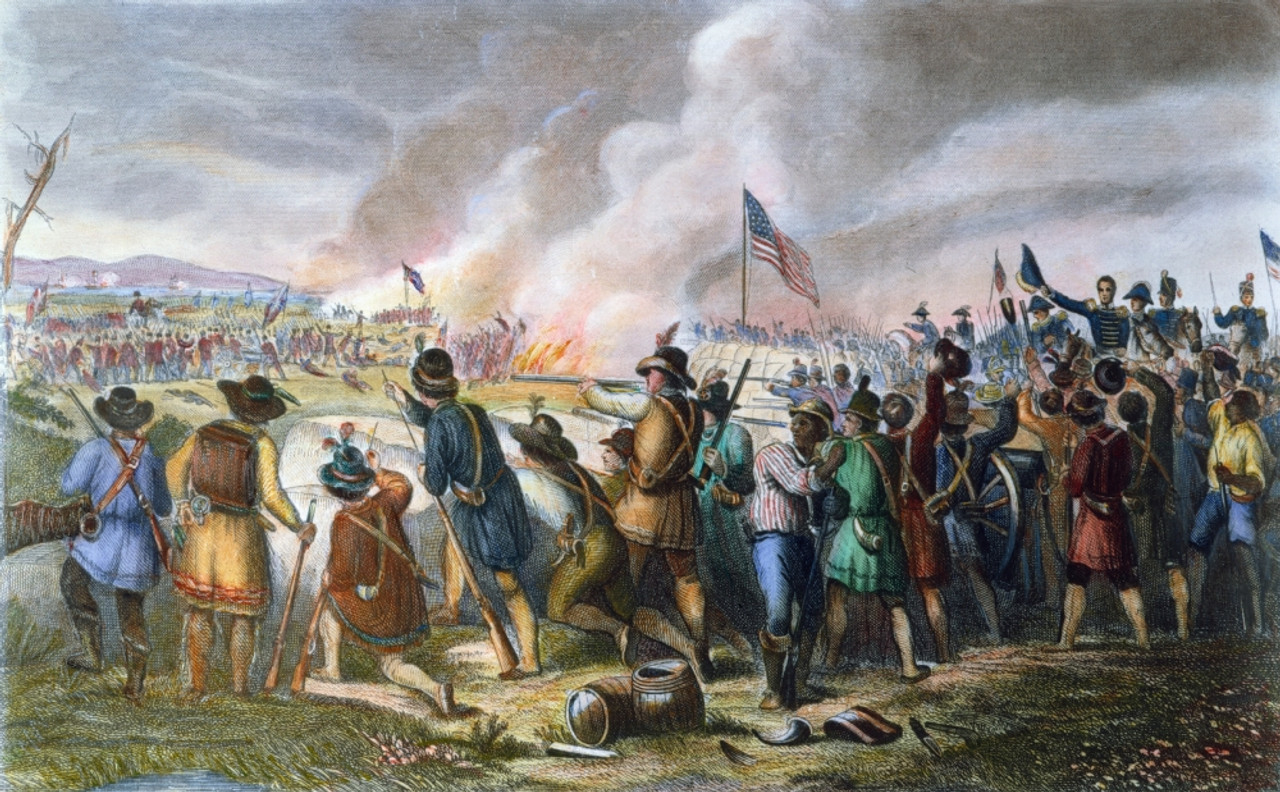
Colored wood engraving of Jackson rallying the troops, from Ballou's Pictorial Drawing Room Companion, 1856 (Historic New Orleans Collection)

Jackson arrived in New Orleans on December 1, 1814. There he instituted martial law because he worried about the loyalty of the city's Creole and Spanish inhabitants. He augmented his force by forming an alliance with Jean Lafitte's smugglers and raising units of free and enslaved African Americans and Creeks, paying non-white volunteers the same salary as whites. This gave Jackson a force of about 5,000 men when the British arrived.

The British arrived in New Orleans in mid-December. Admiral Alexander Cochrane was the overall commander of the operation; General Edward Pakenham commanded the army of 10,000 soldiers, many of whom had served in the Napoleonic Wars. As the British advanced up the east bank of the Mississippi River, Jackson constructed a fortified position to block them. The climactic battle took place on January 8 when the British launched a frontal assault. Their troops made easy targets for the Americans protected by their parapets, and the attack ended in disaster. The British suffered over 2,000 casualties (including Pakenham) to the Americans' 71.

The British decamped from New Orleans at the end of January, but they still remained a threat. Jackson refused to lift martial law and kept the militia under arms. He approved the execution of six militiamen for desertion. Some Creoles registered as French citizens with the French consul and demanded to be discharged from the militia due to their foreign nationality. Jackson then ordered all French citizens to leave the city within three days, and had a member of the Louisiana legislature, Louis Louaillier, arrested when he wrote a newspaper article criticizing Jackson's continuation of martial law. U.S. District Court Judge Dominic A. Hall signed a writ of habeas corpus for Louaillier's release. Jackson had Hall arrested too. A military court ordered Louaillier's release, but Jackson kept him in prison and evicted Hall from the city. Although Jackson lifted martial law when he received official word that the Treaty of Ghent, which ended the war with the British, had been signed, his previous behavior tainted his reputation in New Orleans.

Jackson's victory made him a national hero, and on February 27, 1815, he was given the Thanks of Congress and awarded a Congressional Gold Medal. Though the Treaty of Ghent had been signed in December 1814 before the Battle of New Orleans was fought, Jackson's victory assured that the United States control of the region between Mobile and New Orleans would not be effectively contested by European powers. This control allowed the American government to ignore one of the articles in the treaty, which would have returned the Creek lands taken in the Treaty of Fort Jackson.

=== First Seminole War ===
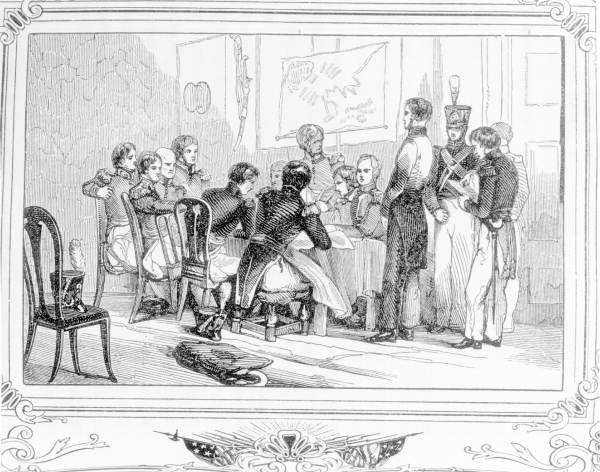
An 1846 wood engraving by William Croome of the trial of Robert Ambrister in Pictorial Life of Andrew Jackson by John Frost

Following the war, Jackson remained in command of troops in the southern half of the United States and was permitted to make his headquarters at the Hermitage. Appointed as Indian commissioner plenipotentiary, Jackson continued to displace the Native Americans in areas under his command. Despite resistance from Secretary of the Treasury William Crawford, he negotiated and signed five treaties between 1816 and 1820 in which the Creek, Choctaw, Cherokee and Chickasaw ceded tens of millions of acres of land to the United States. These included the Treaty of Turkeytown, Treaty of the Chickasaw Council House, Jackson and McMinn Treaty, Treaty of Tuscaloosa, and the Treaty of Doak's Stand.

Jackson soon became embroiled in conflict in Florida. The former British post at Prospect Bluff, which became known to Americans as "the Negro fort", remained occupied by more than a thousand former soldiers of the British Royal and Colonial Marines, escaped slaves, and various indigenous peoples. It had become a magnet for escapees and was seen as a threat to the property rights of American enslavers, even a potential source of insurrection by enslaved people. Jackson ordered Colonel Duncan Clinch to capture the fort in July 1816. He destroyed it and killed many of the garrison. Some survivors were enslaved while others fled into the wilderness of Florida.

White American settlers were in constant conflict with Native American people collectively known as the Seminoles, who straddled the border between the U.S. and Florida. In December 1817, Secretary of War John C. Calhoun initiated the First Seminole War by ordering Jackson to lead a campaign "with full power to conduct the war as he may think best". Jackson believed the best way to do this was to seize Florida from Spain once and for all. Before departing, Jackson wrote to President James Monroe, "Let it be signified to me through any channel ... that the possession of the Floridas would be desirable to the United States, and in sixty days it will be accomplished."

Jackson invaded Florida, captured the Spanish fort of St. Marks, and occupied Pensacola. Seminole and allied Native resistance was effectively ended by May 1818. He also captured two British subjects, Robert Ambrister and Alexander Arbuthnot, who had been working with the Seminoles. After a brief trial, Jackson executed both of them, causing an international incident with the British. Jackson's actions polarized Monroe's cabinet. The occupied territories were returned to Spain. Calhoun wanted him censured for violating the Constitution, since the United States had not declared war on Spain. Secretary of State John Quincy Adams defended him as he thought Jackson's occupation of Pensacola would lead Spain to sell Florida. Spain ceded Florida in the Adams–Onís Treaty in exchange for the United States assuming all claims against Spain by American citizens and renouncing all claims to Texas west of the Sabine River. In February 1819, a congressional investigation exonerated Jackson, and his victory was instrumental in convincing the Seminoles to sign the Treaty of Moultrie Creek in 1823, which surrendered much of their land in Florida.

== Presidential aspirations ==
=== Election of 1824 ===
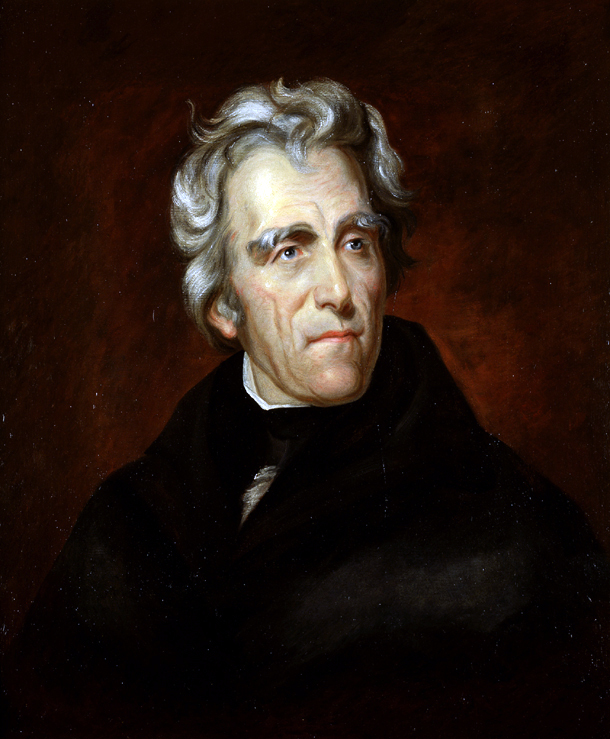
Painting of Jackson based on an 1824 portrait, c. 1857 attributed to Thomas Sully now housed at the U. S. Senate Collection

The Panic of 1819, the United States' first prolonged financial depression, caused Congress to reduce the military's size and abolish Jackson's generalship. In compensation, Monroe made him the first territorial governor of Florida in 1821. He served as the governor for two months, returning to the Hermitage in ill health. During his convalescence, Jackson, who had been a Freemason since at least 1798, became the Grand Master of the Grand Lodge of Tennessee for 1822–1823. Around this time, he also completed negotiations for Tennessee to purchase Chickasaw lands. This became known as the Jackson Purchase. Jackson, Overton, and another colleague had speculated in some of the land and used their portion to form the town of Memphis.

In 1822, Jackson agreed to run in the 1824 presidential election, and he was nominated by the Tennessee legislature in July. At the time, the Federalist Party had collapsed, and there were four major contenders for the Democratic-Republican Party nomination: William Crawford, John Quincy Adams, Henry Clay and John C. Calhoun. Jackson was intended to be a stalking horse candidate to prevent Tennessee's electoral votes from going to Crawford, who was seen as a Washington insider. Jackson unexpectedly garnered popular support outside of Tennessee and became a serious candidate. He benefited from the expansion of suffrage among white males that followed the conclusion of the War of 1812. He was a popular war hero whose reputation suggested he had the decisiveness and independence to bring reform to Washington. He also was promoted as an outsider who stood for all the people, blaming banks for the country's depression.

The 1824 U.S. presidential election results in which Jackson received a plurality of Electoral College votes. Subsequently, John Quincy Adams was elected the sixth president of the United States in a contingent election.

During his presidential candidacy, Jackson reluctantly ran for one of Tennessee's U.S. Senate seats. Jackson's political managers William Berkeley Lewis and John Eaton convinced him that he needed to defeat incumbent John Williams, who opposed him. The legislature elected Jackson in October 1823. He was attentive to his senatorial duties. He was appointed chairman of the Committee on Military Affairs but avoided debate or initiating legislation. He used his time in the Senate to form alliances and make peace with old adversaries. Eaton continued to campaign for Jackson's presidency, updating his biography and writing a series of widely circulated pseudonymous letters that portrayed Jackson as a champion of republican liberty.

Democratic-Republican presidential nominees had historically been chosen by informal congressional nominating caucuses. In 1824, most of the Democratic-Republicans in Congress boycotted the caucus, and the power to choose nominees was shifting to state nominating committees and legislatures. Jackson was nominated by a Pennsylvania convention, making him not merely a regional candidate but the leading national contender. When Jackson won the Pennsylvania nomination, Calhoun dropped out of the presidential race. Afterwards, Jackson won the nomination in six other states and had a strong second-place finish in three others.

In the presidential election, Jackson won a 42-percent plurality of the popular vote. He also won a plurality of electoral votes, receiving 99 votes from states in the South, West, and Mid-Atlantic. He was the only candidate to win states outside of his regional base: Adams dominated New England, Crawford won Virginia and Georgia, and Clay took three western states. Because no candidate had a majority of 131 electoral votes, the House of Representatives held a contingent election under the terms of the Twelfth Amendment. The amendment specifies that only the top three electoral vote-winners are eligible to be elected by the House, so Clay was eliminated from contention. Clay, who was also Speaker of the House and presided over the election's resolution, saw a Jackson presidency as a disaster for the country. Clay threw his support behind Adams, who won the contingent election on the first ballot. Adams appointed Clay as his Secretary of State, leading supporters of Jackson to accuse Clay and Adams of having struck a "corrupt bargain". After the Congressional session concluded, Jackson resigned his Senate seat and returned to Tennessee.

=== Election of 1828 and death of Rachel Jackson ===
The 1828 U.S. presidential election results

After the election, Jackson's supporters formed a new party to undermine Adams and ensure he served only one term. Adams's presidency went poorly, and Adams's behavior undermined it. He was perceived as an intellectual elite who ignored the needs of the populace. He was unable to accomplish anything because Congress blocked his proposals. In his First Annual Message to Congress, Adams stated that "we are palsied by the will of our constituents", which was interpreted as his being against representative democracy. Jackson responded by championing the needs of ordinary citizens and declaring that "the voice of the people ... must be heard".

Jackson was nominated for president by the Tennessee legislature in October 1825, more than three years before the 1828 election. He gained powerful supporters in both the South and North, including Calhoun, who became Jackson's vice-presidential running mate, and New York Senator Martin Van Buren. Meanwhile, Adams's support from the Southern states was eroded when he signed a tax on European imports, the Tariff of 1828, which was called the "Tariff of Abominations" by opponents, into law. Jackson's victory in the presidential race was overwhelming. He won 56 percent of the popular vote and 68 percent of the electoral vote. The election ended the one-party system that had formed during the Era of Good Feelings as Jackson's supporters coalesced into the Democratic Party and the various groups who did not support him eventually formed the Whig Party.

The political campaign was dominated by the personal abuse that partisans flung at both candidates. Jackson was accused of being the son of an English prostitute and a mulatto, and he was accurately labeled a slave trader who trafficked in human flesh. A series of pamphlets known as the Coffin Handbills accused him of having murdered 18 white men, including the soldiers he had executed for desertion and alleging that he stabbed a man in the back with his cane. They stated that he had intentionally massacred Native American women and children at the Battle of Horseshoe Bend, ate the bodies of Native Americans he killed in battle, and threatened to cut off the ears of congressmen who questioned his behavior during the First Seminole War.

Jackson and Rachel were accused of adultery for living together before her divorce was finalized, and Rachel heard about the accusation. She had been under stress throughout the election, and just as Jackson was preparing to head to Washington for his inauguration, she fell ill. She did not live to see her husband become president, dying of a stroke or heart attack a few days later. Jackson believed that the abuse from Adams's supporters had hastened her death, stating at her funeral: "May God Almighty forgive her murderers, as I know she forgave them. I never can."

== Presidency (1829–1837) ==
=== Inauguration ===
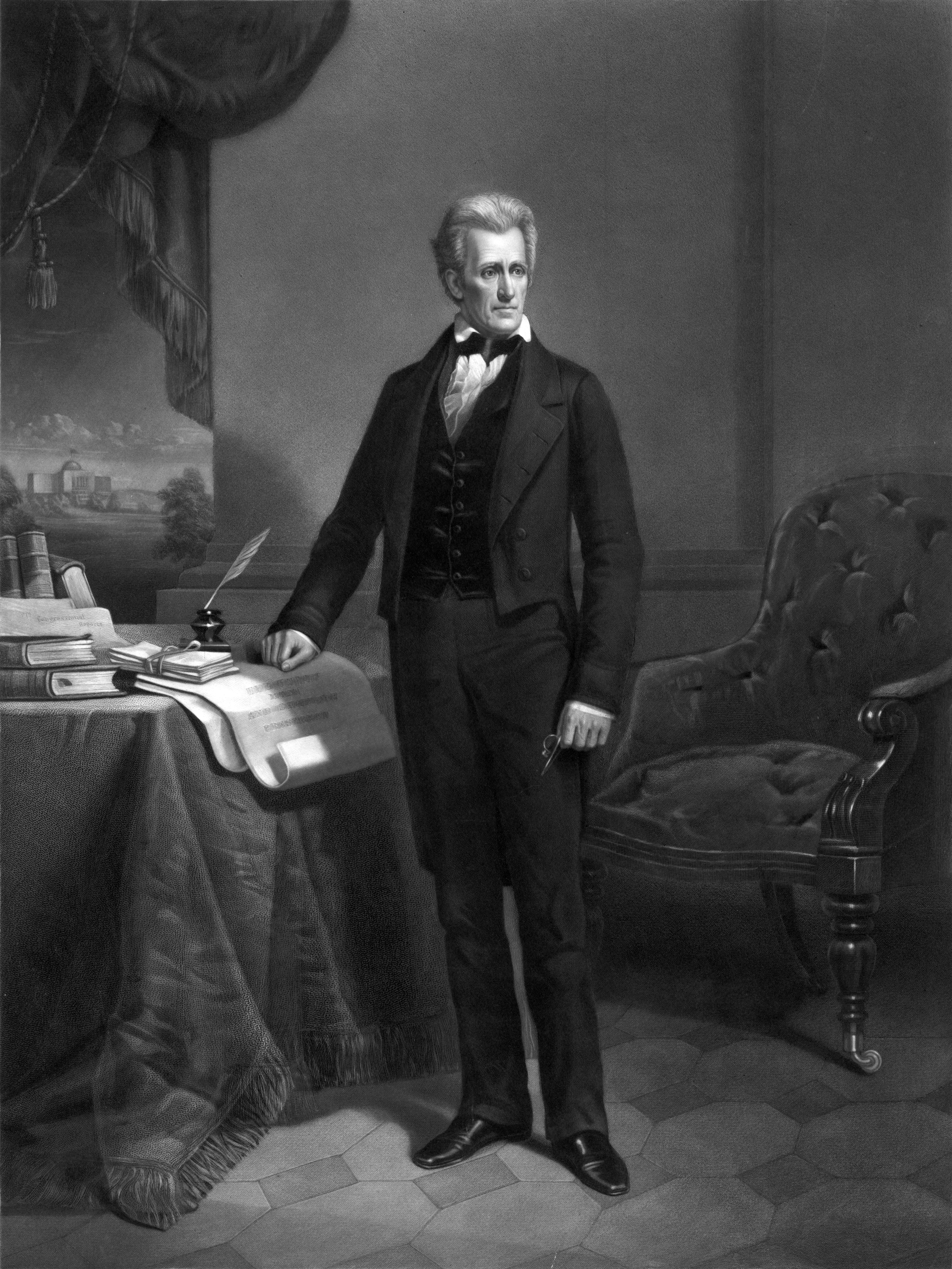
Engraving of President Jackson by A. H. Ritchie based on Dennis Malone Carter's portrait, c. 1860

Jackson arrived in Washington, D.C., on February 11, and began forming his cabinet. He chose Van Buren as Secretary of State, John Eaton as Secretary of War, Samuel D. Ingham as Secretary of Treasury, John Branch as Secretary of Navy, John M. Berrien as Attorney General, and William T. Barry as Postmaster General. Jackson was inaugurated on March 4, 1829; Adams, who was embittered by his defeat, refused to attend. Jackson was the first president-elect to take the oath of office on the East Portico of the U.S. Capitol. In his inaugural address, he promised to protect the sovereignty of the states, respect the limits of the presidency, reform the government by removing disloyal or incompetent appointees, and observe a fair policy toward Native Americans. Jackson invited the public to the White House, which was promptly overrun by well-wishers who caused minor damage to its furnishings. The spectacle earned him the nickname "King Mob".

=== Reforms and rotation in office ===
Jackson believed that Adams's administration had been corrupt and he initiated investigations into all executive departments. These investigations revealed that $280,000 (equivalent to $8,500,000 in 2025) was stolen from the Treasury. They also resulted in a reduction in costs to the Department of the Navy, saving $1 million (equivalent to $30,200,000 in 2025). Jackson asked Congress to tighten laws on embezzlement and tax evasion, and he pushed for an improved government accounting system.

Jackson implemented a principle he called "rotation in office". The previous custom had been for the president to leave the existing appointees in office, replacing them through attrition. Jackson enforced the Tenure of Office Act, an 1820 law that limited office tenure, authorized the president to remove current office holders, and appoint new ones. During his first year in office, he removed about 10% of all federal employees and replaced them with loyal Democrats. Jackson argued that rotation in office reduced corruption by making officeholders responsible to the popular will, but it functioned as political patronage and became known as the spoils system.

=== Petticoat affair ===
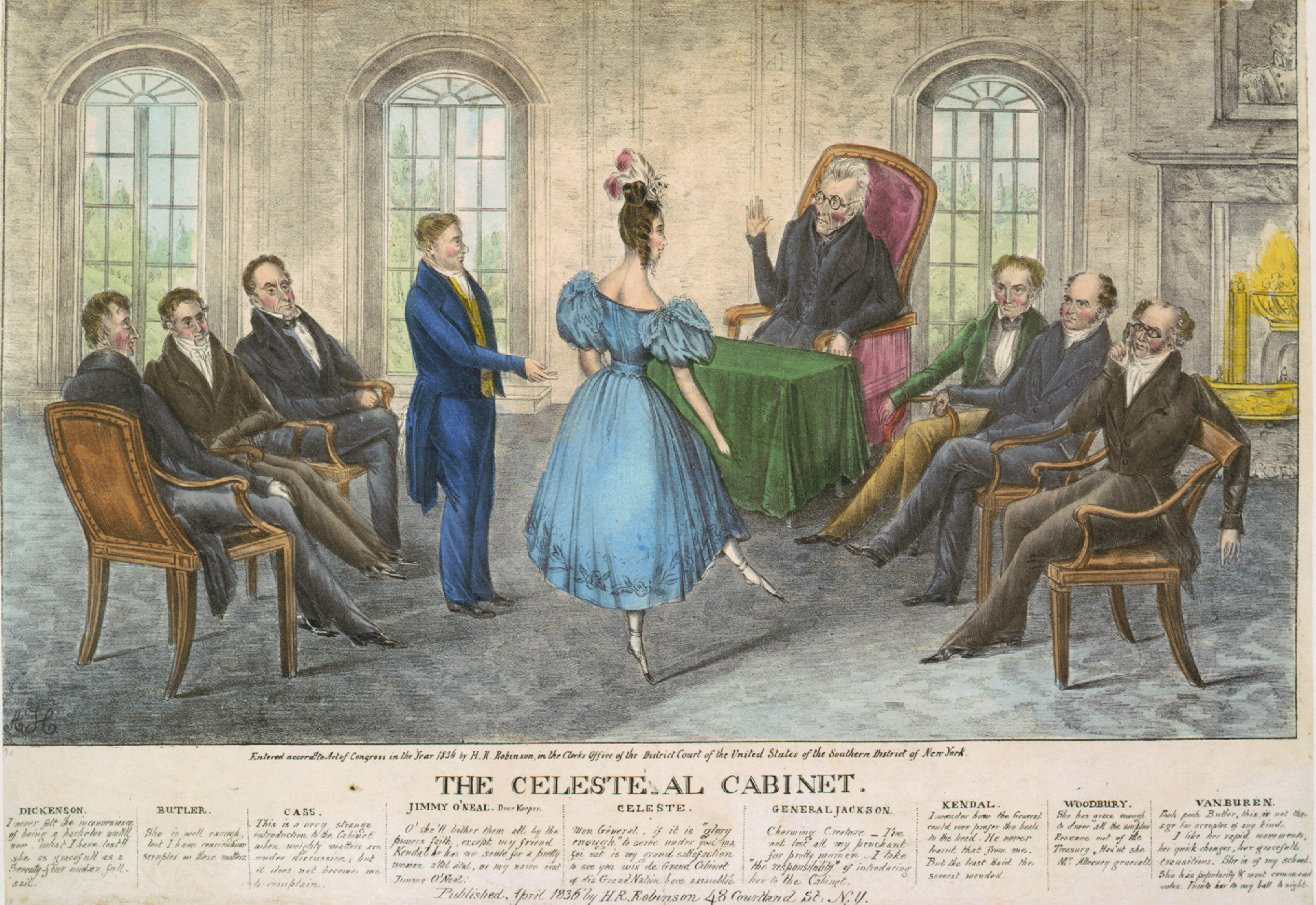
A lithograph cartoon, The Celeste-al Cabinet, by Albert A. Hoffay, published by Henry R. Robinson in 1836, depicting Jackson's cabinet during the Petticoat Affair; "Celeste" is Margaret Eaton.

Jackson spent much of his time during his first two and a half years in office dealing with what came to be known as the "Petticoat affair" or "Eaton affair". The affair focused on Secretary of War Eaton's wife, Margaret. She had a reputation for being promiscuous, and like Rachel Jackson, she was accused of adultery. She and Eaton had been close before her first husband John Timberlake died, and they married nine months after his death. With the exception of Barry's wife Catherine, the cabinet members' wives followed the lead of Vice-president Calhoun's wife Floride and refused to socialize with the Eatons. Though Jackson defended Margaret, her presence split the cabinet, which had been so ineffective that he rarely called it into session, and the ongoing disagreement led to its dissolution.

In early 1831, Jackson demanded the resignations of all the cabinet members except Barry, who would resign in 1835 when a Congressional investigation revealed his mismanagement of the Post Office. Jackson tried to compensate Van Buren by appointing him the Minister to Great Britain, but Calhoun blocked the nomination with a tie-breaking vote against it. Van Buren—along with newspaper editors Amos Kendall and Francis Preston Blair—would become regular participants in Jackson's Kitchen Cabinet, an unofficial, varying group of advisors that Jackson turned to for decision making even after he had formed a new official cabinet.

=== Indian Removal Act ===
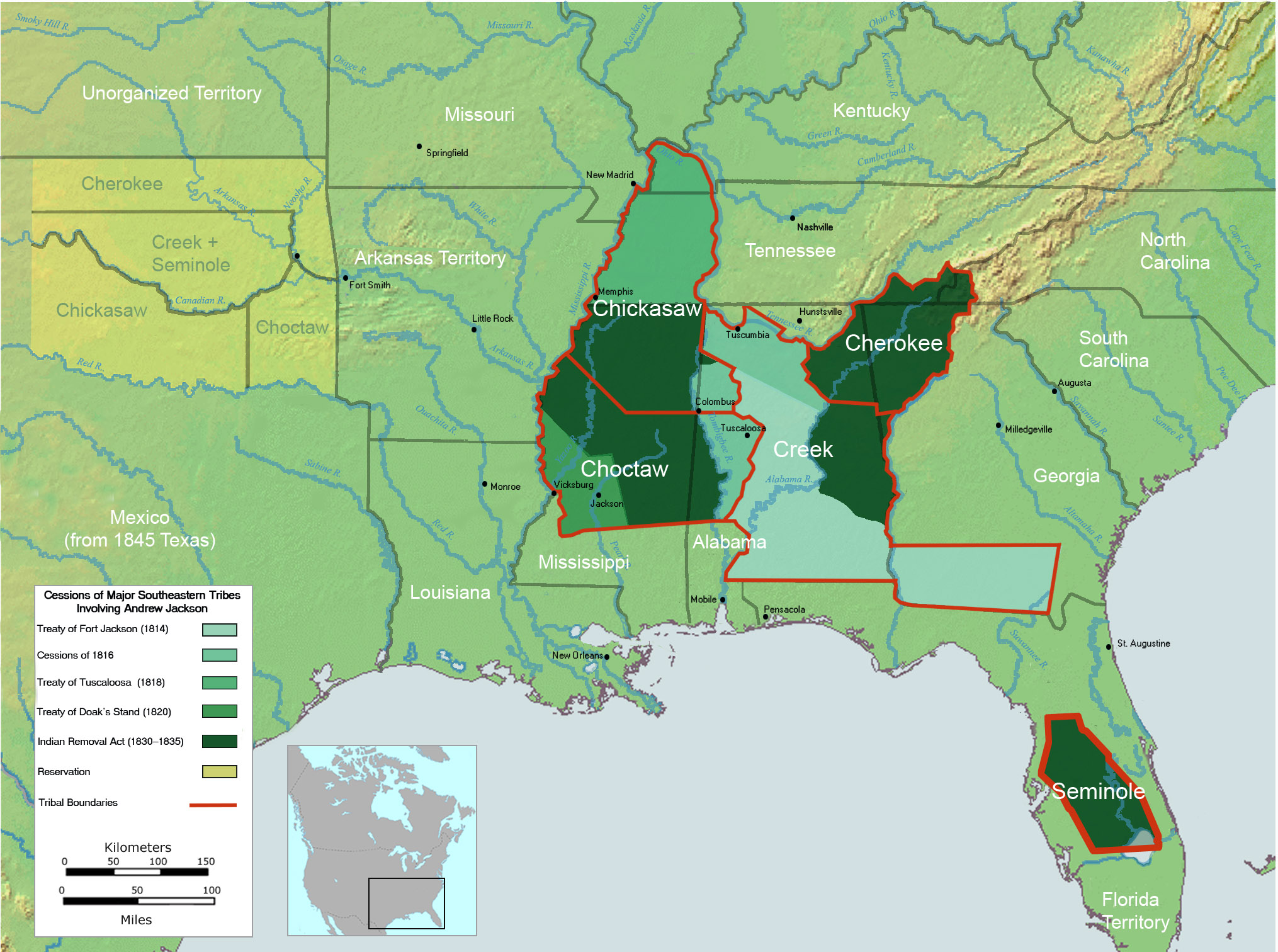
The Indian Removal Act and treaties involving Jackson before his presidency displaced most of the major tribes of the Southeast from their traditional territories east of the Mississippi River.

Jackson's presidency marked the beginning of a national policy of Native American removal. Before Jackson took office, the relationship between the southern states and the Native American tribes who lived within their boundaries was strained. The states felt that they had full jurisdiction over their territories; the native tribes saw themselves as autonomous nations that had a right to the land they lived on. Significant portions of the five major tribes in the area then known as the Southwest—the Cherokee, Choctaw, Chickasaw, Creek, and Seminoles—began to adopt white culture, including education, agricultural techniques, a road system, and rudimentary manufacturing. In the case of the tensions between the state of Georgia and the Cherokee, Adams had tried to address the issue encouraging Cherokee emigration west of the Mississippi through financial incentives, but most refused.

In the first days of Jackson's presidency, some southern states passed legislation extending state jurisdiction to Native American lands. Jackson supported the states' right to do so. His position was later made clear in the 1832 Supreme Court test case of this legislation, Worcester v. Georgia. Georgia had arrested a group of missionaries for entering Cherokee territory without a permit; the Cherokee declared these arrests illegal. The court under Chief Justice John Marshall decided in favor of the Cherokee: imposition of Georgia law on the Cherokee was unconstitutional. Horace Greeley alleges that when Jackson heard the ruling, he said, "Well, John Marshall has made his decision, but now let him enforce it." Although the quote may be apocryphal, Jackson made it clear he would not use the federal government to enforce the ruling.

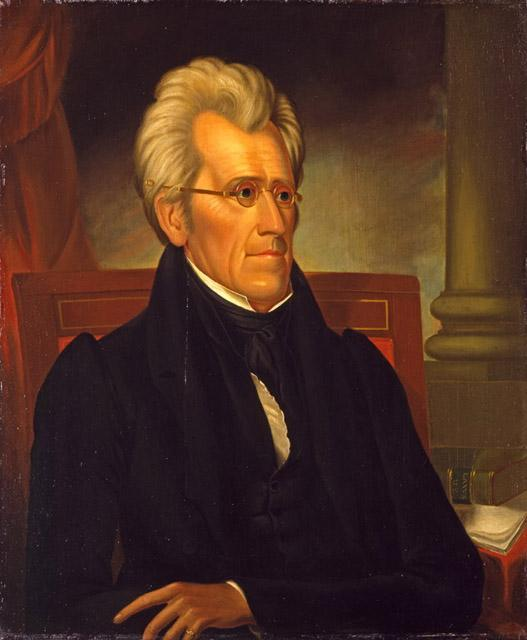
Portrait of President Andrew Jackson, c. 1830–1832 by Ralph Eleaser Whiteside Earl now housed at the North Carolina Museum of Art

Jackson used the power of the federal government to enforce the separation of Indigenous tribes and whites. In May 1830, Jackson signed the Indian Removal Act, which Congress had narrowly passed. It gave the president the right to negotiate treaties to buy tribal lands in the eastern part of the United States in exchange for lands set aside for Native Americans west of the Mississippi, as well as broad discretion on how to use the federal funds allocated to the negotiations. The law was supposed to be a voluntary relocation program, but it was not implemented as one. Jackson's administration often achieved agreement to relocate through bribes, fraud and intimidation, and the leaders who signed the treaties often did not represent the entire tribe. The relocations could be a source of misery too: the Choctaw relocation was rife with corruption, theft, and mismanagement that brought great suffering to that people.

In 1830, Jackson personally negotiated with the Chickasaw, who quickly agreed to move. In the same year, Choctaw leaders signed the Treaty of Dancing Rabbit Creek; the majority did not want the treaty but complied with its terms. In 1832, Seminole leaders signed the Treaty of Payne's Landing, which stipulated that the Seminoles would move west and become part of the Muscogee Creek Confederacy if they found the new land suitable. Most Seminoles refused to move, leading to the Second Seminole War in 1835 that lasted six years. Members of the Muscogee Creek Confederacy ceded their land to the state of Alabama in the Treaty of Cusseta of 1832. Their private ownership of the land was to be protected, but the federal government did not enforce this. The government did encourage voluntary removal until the Creek War of 1836, after which almost all Creek were removed to Oklahoma territory. In 1836, Cherokee leaders ceded their land to the government by the Treaty of New Echota. Their removal, known as the Trail of Tears, was enforced by Jackson's successor, Van Buren.

Jackson also applied the removal policy in the Northwest. He was not successful in removing the Haudenosaunee (Iroquois) Confederacy in New York, but when some members of the Meskwaki (Fox) and the Sauk triggered the Black Hawk War by trying to cross back to the east side of the Mississippi, the peace treaties ratified after their defeat reduced their lands further.

During his administration, he made about 70 treaties with American Indian tribes. He had removed almost all the Native Americans east of the Mississippi and south of Lake Michigan, about 70,000 people, from the United States; though it was done at the cost of thousands of Native American lives lost because of the unsanitary conditions and epidemics arising from their dislocation, as well as their resistance to expulsion. Jackson's implementation of the Indian Removal Act contributed to his popularity with his constituency. He added over 170,000 square miles of land to the public domain, which primarily benefited the United States' agricultural interests. The act also benefited small farmers, as Jackson allowed them to purchase moderate plots at low prices and offered squatters on land formerly belonging to Native Americans the option to purchase it before it was offered for sale to others.

=== Nullification crisis ===
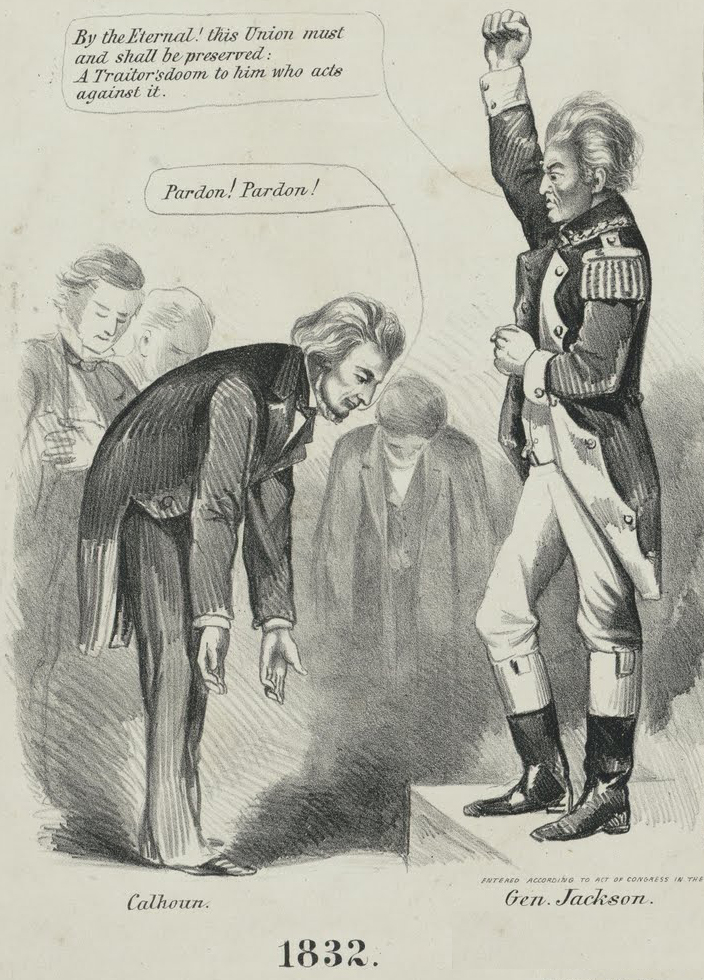
A Civil War–era lithograph cartoon of John C. Calhoun bowing before Jackson during the nullification crisis by Pendleton's Lithography and published by L. Prang & Co. in 1864

Jackson had to confront another challenge that had been building up since the beginning of his first term. The Tariff of 1828, which had been passed in the last year of Adams' administration, set a protective tariff at a very high rate to prevent the manufacturing industries in the Northern states from having to compete with lower-priced imports from Britain. The tariff reduced the income of southern cotton planters: it propped up consumer prices, but not the price of cotton, which had severely declined in the previous decade. Immediately after the tariff's passage, the South Carolina Exposition and Protest was sent to the U.S. Senate. This document, which had been anonymously written by John C. Calhoun, asserted that the constitution was a compact of individual states and when the federal government went beyond its delegated duties, such as enacting a protective tariff, a state had a right to declare this action unconstitutional and make the act null and void within the borders of that state.

Jackson suspected Calhoun of writing the Exposition and Protest and opposed his interpretation. Jackson argued that Congress had full authority to enact tariffs and that a dissenting state was denying the will of the majority. He also needed the tariff, which generated 90% of the federal revenue, to achieve another of his presidential goals, eliminating the national debt. The issue developed into a personal rivalry between the two men. For example, during a celebration of Thomas Jefferson's birthday on April 13, 1830, the attendees gave after-dinner toasts. Jackson toasted: "Our federal Union: It must be preserved!" – a clear challenge to nullification. Calhoun, whose toast immediately followed, rebutted: "The Union: Next to our Liberty, the most dear!"

As a compromise, Jackson supported the Tariff of 1832, which reduced the duties from the Tariff of 1828 by almost half. The bill was signed on July 9, but failed to satisfy extremists on either side. On November 24, South Carolina passed the Ordinance of Nullification, declaring both tariffs null and void and threatening to secede from the United States if the federal government tried to use force to collect the duties. In response, Jackson sent warships to Charleston harbor, and threatened to hang any man who worked to support nullification or secession. On December 10, he issued a proclamation against the "nullifiers", condemning nullification as contrary to the Constitution's letter and spirit, rejecting the right of secession, and declaring that South Carolina stood on "the brink of insurrection and treason". On December 28, Calhoun, who had been elected to the U.S. Senate, resigned as vice president.

Jackson asked Congress to pass a "Force Bill" authorizing the military to enforce the tariff. It was attacked by Calhoun as despotism. Meanwhile, Calhoun and Clay began to work on a new compromise tariff. Jackson saw it as an effective way to end the confrontation but insisted on the passage of the Force Bill before he signed. On March 2, he signed into law the Force Bill and the Tariff of 1833. The South Carolina Convention then met and rescinded its nullification ordinance but nullified the Force Bill in a final act of defiance. Two months later, Jackson reflected on South Carolina's nullification: "the tariff was only the pretext, and disunion and southern confederacy the real object. The next pretext will be the negro, or slavery question".

=== Bank War and Election of 1832 ===
==== Bank veto ====
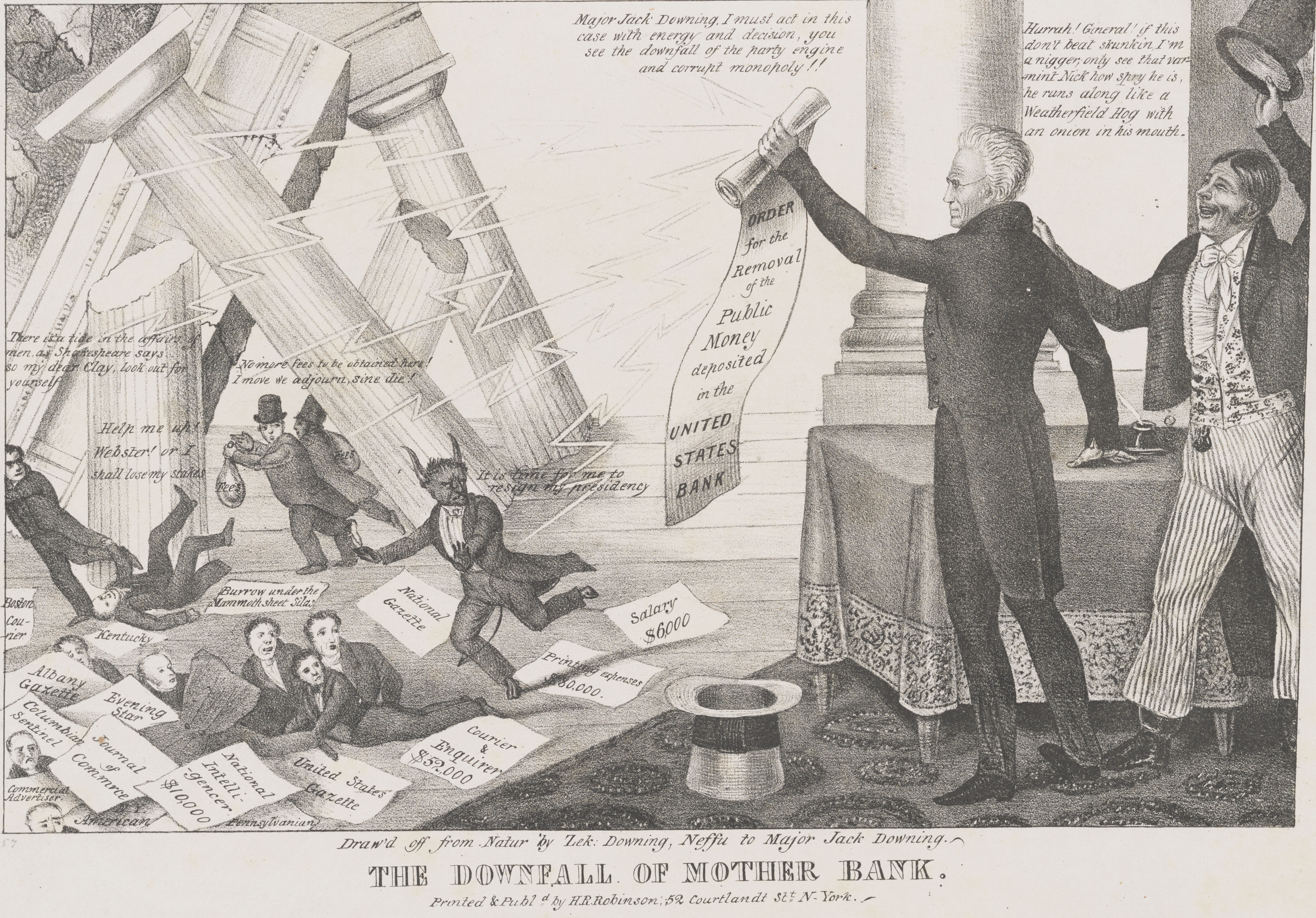
An 1833 lithograph cartoon of Jackson destroying the Second Bank of the United States with his "Removal Notice" by Zachariah Downing, published by Henry R. Robinson; Nicholas Biddle is portrayed as the devil.

A few weeks after his inauguration, Jackson started looking into how he could replace the Second Bank of the United States. The Bank had been chartered by President Madison in 1816 to restore the United States economy after the War of 1812. Monroe had appointed Nicholas Biddle as the Bank's executive. The Bank was a repository for the country's public monies which also serviced the national debt; it was formed as a for-profit entity that looked after the concerns of its shareholders. In 1828, the country was prosperous and the currency was stable, but Jackson saw the Bank as a fourth branch of government run by an elite, what he called the "money power" that sought to control the labor and earnings of the "real people", who depend on their own efforts to succeed: the planters, farmers, mechanics, and laborers. Additionally, Jackson's own near bankruptcy in 1804 due to credit-fuelled land speculation had biased him against paper money and toward a policy favorable to hard money.

In his First Annual Address in December 1829, Jackson openly challenged the Bank by questioning its constitutionality and the soundness of its money. Jackson's supporters further alleged that it gave preferential loans to speculators and merchants over artisans and farmers, that it used its money to bribe congressmen and the press, and that it had ties with foreign creditors. Biddle responded to Jackson's challenge in early 1830 by using the Bank's vast financial holding to ensure the Bank's reputation, and his supporters argued that the Bank was the key to prosperity and stable commerce. By the time of the 1832 election, Biddle had spent over $250,000 (equivalent to $8,062,500 in 2025) in printing pamphlets, lobbying for pro-Bank legislation, hiring agents and giving loans to editors and congressmen.

On the surface, Jackson's and Biddle's positions did not appear irreconcilable. Jackson seemed open to keeping the Bank if it could include some degree of Federal oversight, limit its real estate holdings, and have its property subject to taxation by the states. Many of Jackson's cabinet members thought a compromise was possible. In 1831, Treasury Secretary Louis McLane told Biddle that Jackson was open to chartering a modified version of the Bank, but Biddle did not consult Jackson directly. Privately, Jackson expressed opposition to the Bank; publicly, he announced that he would leave the decision concerning the Bank in the hands of the people. Biddle was finally convinced to take open action by Henry Clay, who had decided to run for president against Jackson in the 1832 election. Biddle would agree to seek renewal of the charter two years earlier than scheduled. Clay argued that Jackson was in a bind. If he vetoed the charter, he would lose the votes of his pro-Bank constituents in Pennsylvania; but if he signed the charter, he would lose his anti-Bank constituents. After the recharter bill was passed, Jackson vetoed it on July 10, 1832, arguing that the country should not surrender the will of the majority to the desires of the wealthy.

==== Election of 1832 ====
1832 U.S. presidential election results

The 1832 presidential election demonstrated the rapid development of political parties during Jackson's presidency. The Democratic Party's first national convention, held in Baltimore, nominated Jackson's choice for vice president, Martin Van Buren. The National Republican Party, which had held its first convention in Baltimore earlier in December 1831, nominated Clay, now a senator from Kentucky, and John Sergeant of Pennsylvania. An Anti-Masonic Party, with a platform built around opposition to Freemasonry, supported neither Jackson nor Clay, who both were Masons. The party nominated William Wirt of Maryland and Amos Ellmaker of Pennsylvania.

In addition to the votes Jackson would lose because of the bank veto, Clay hoped that Jackson's Indian Removal Act would alienate voters in the East; but Jackson's losses were offset by the Act's popularity in the West and Southwest. Clay had also expected that Jackson would lose votes because of his stand on internal improvements. Jackson had vetoed the Maysville Road bill, which funded an upgrade of a section of the National Road in Clay's state of Kentucky; Jackson had argued it was unconstitutional to fund internal improvements using national funds for local projects.

Clay's strategy failed. Jackson was able to mobilize the Democratic Party's strong political networks. The Northeast supported Jackson because he was in favor of maintaining a stiff tariff; the West supported him because the Indian Removal Act reduced the number of Native Americans in the region and made available more public land. Except for South Carolina, which passed the Ordinance of Nullification during the election month and refused to support any party by giving its votes to the future Governor of Virginia John B. Floyd, the South supported Jackson for implementing the Indian Removal Act, as well as for his willingness to compromise by signing the Tariff of 1832. Jackson won the election by a landslide, receiving 55 percent of the popular vote and 219 electoral votes.

==== Removal of deposits and censure ====
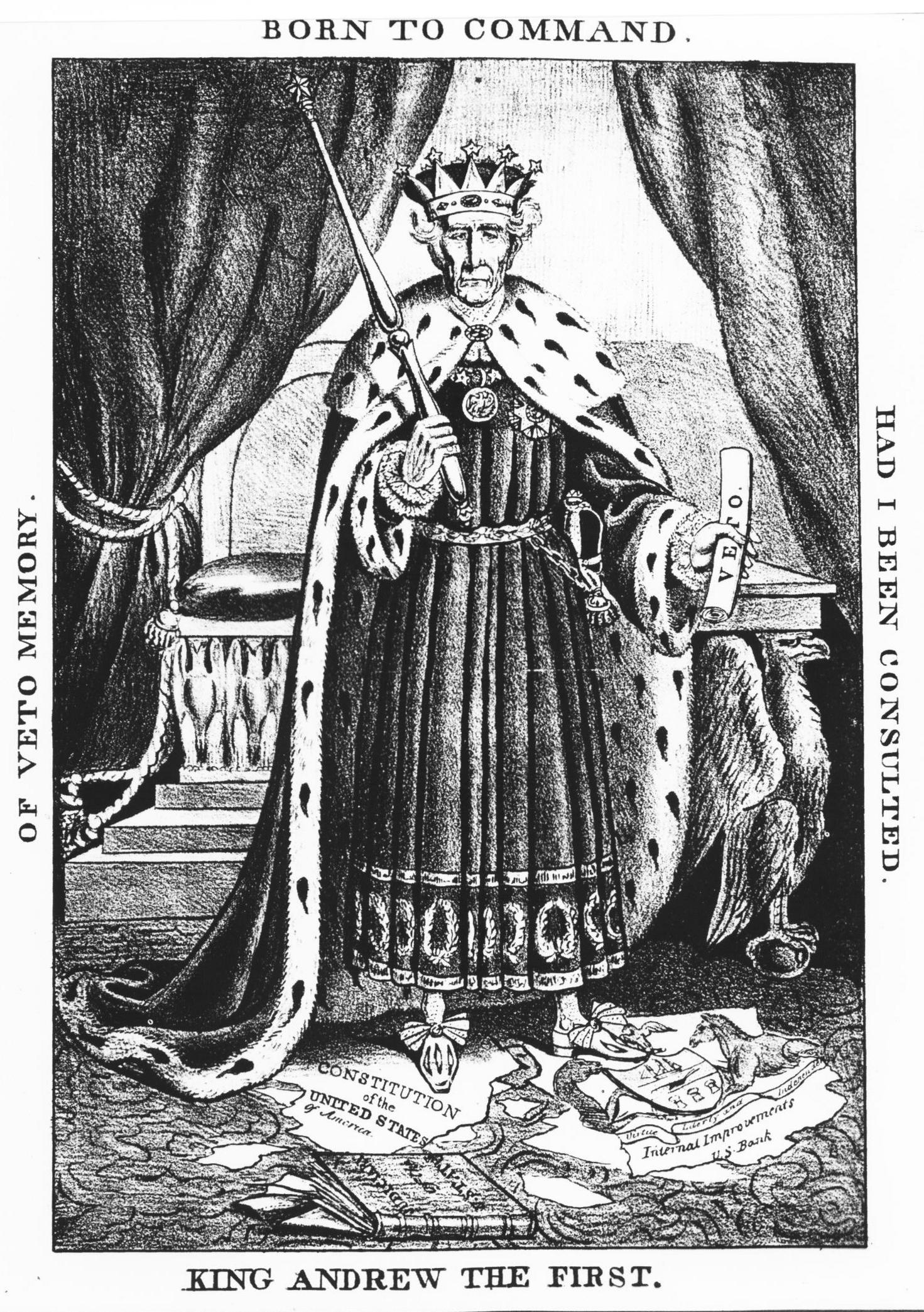
An 1832 lithograph cartoon satirizing Jackson as "King Andrew the First" by an anonymous artist

Jackson saw his victory as a mandate to continue his war on the Bank's control over the national economy. In 1833, Jackson signed an executive order ending the deposit of Treasury receipts in the bank. When Secretary of the Treasury McLane refused to execute the order, Jackson replaced him with William J. Duane, who also refused. Jackson then appointed Roger B. Taney as acting secretary, who implemented Jackson's policy. With the loss of federal deposits, the Bank had to contract its credit. Biddle used this contraction to create an economic downturn in an attempt to get Jackson to compromise. Biddle wrote, "Nothing but the evidence of suffering abroad will produce any effect in Congress." The attempt did not succeed: the economy recovered and Biddle was blamed for the recession.

Jackson's actions led those who disagreed with him to form the Whig Party. They claimed to oppose Jackson's expansion of executive power, calling him "King Andrew the First", and naming their party after the English Whigs who opposed the British monarchy in the 17th century. In March 1834, the Senate censured Jackson for inappropriately taking authority for the Treasury Department when it was the responsibility of Congress and refused to confirm Taney's appointment as secretary of the treasury. In April, however, the House declared that the bank should not be rechartered. By July 1836, the Bank no longer held any federal deposits.

Jackson had Federal funds deposited into state banks friendly to the administration's policies, which critics called pet banks. The number of these state banks more than doubled during Jackson's administration, and investment patterns changed. The Bank, which had been the federal government's fiscal agent, invested heavily in trade and financed interregional and international trade. State banks were more responsive to state governments and invested heavily in land development, land speculation, and state public works projects. In spite of the efforts of Taney's successor, Levi Woodbury, to control them, the pet banks expanded their loans, helping to create a speculative boom in the final years of Jackson's administration.

In January 1835, Jackson paid off the national debt, the only time in U.S. history that it had been accomplished. It was paid down through tariff revenues, carefully managing federal funding of internal improvements like roads and canals, and the sale of public lands. Between 1834 and 1836, the government had an unprecedented spike in land sales: At its peak in 1836, the profits from land sales were eight to twelve times higher than a typical year. During Jackson's presidency, 63 million acres of public land—about the size of the state of Oklahoma—was sold. After Jackson's term expired in 1837, a Democrat-majority Senate expunged Jackson's censure.

==== Panic of 1837 ====
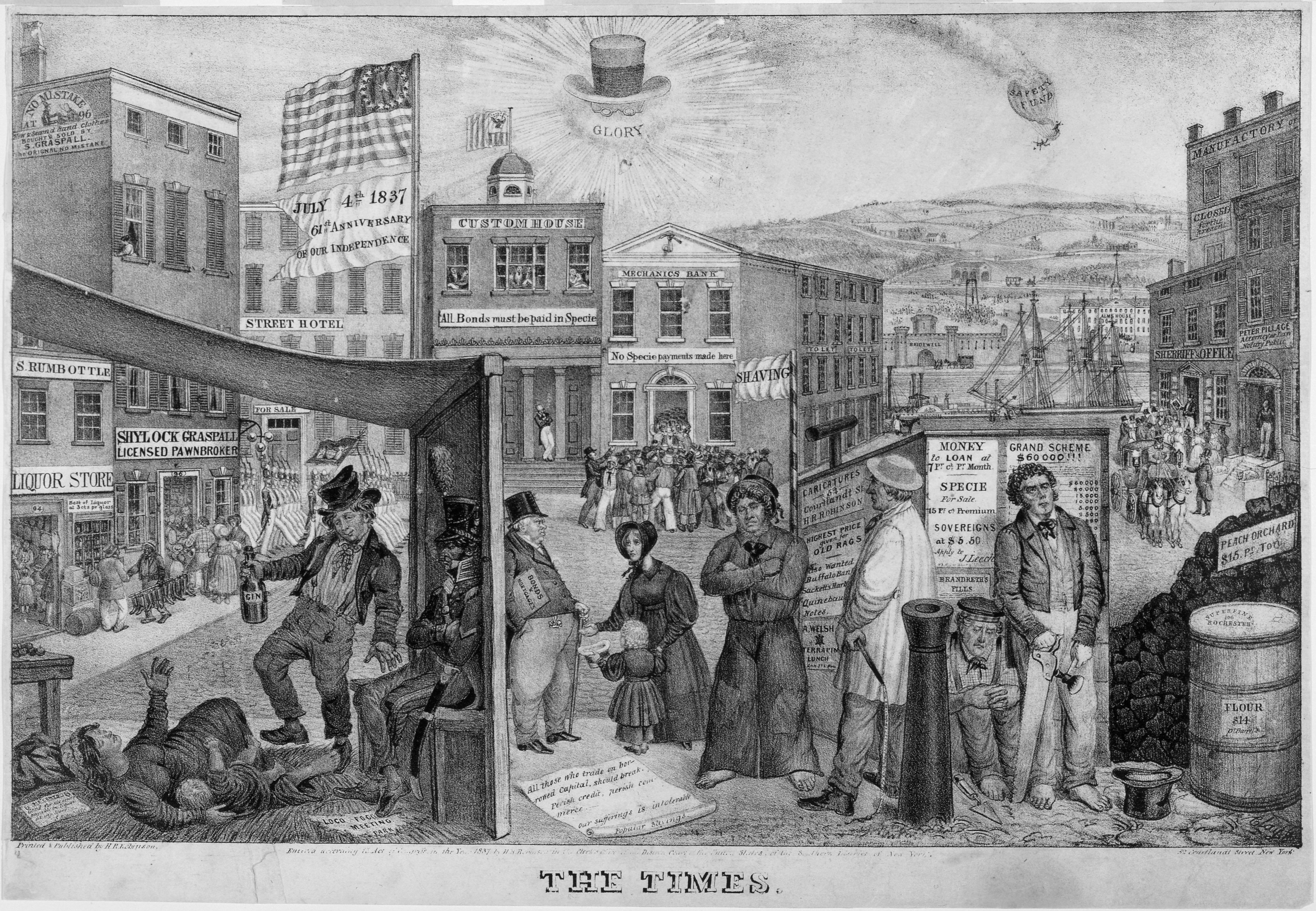
A lithograph cartoon of the Panic of 1837 published by Henry R. Robinson in 1837; Jackson is symbolized by "glory" in the sky with top hat, spectacles, and pipe.

Despite the economic boom following Jackson's victory in the Bank War, land speculation in the west caused the Panic of 1837. Jackson's transfer of federal monies to state banks in 1833 caused western banks to relax their lending standards; the Indian Removal Act made large amounts of former Native American lands available for purchase and speculation. Two of Jackson's acts in 1836 contributed to the Panic of 1837. One was the Specie Circular, which mandated western lands only be purchased by money backed by specie. The act was intended to stabilize the economy by reducing speculation on credit, but it caused a drain of gold and silver from the Eastern banks to the Western banks to address the needs of financing land transactions. The other was the Deposit and Distribution Act, which transferred federal monies from eastern to western state banks. Together, they left Eastern banks unable to pay specie to the British when they recalled their loans to address their economic problems in international trade. The panic drove the U.S. economy into a depression that lasted until 1841.

=== Physical assault and assassination attempt ===
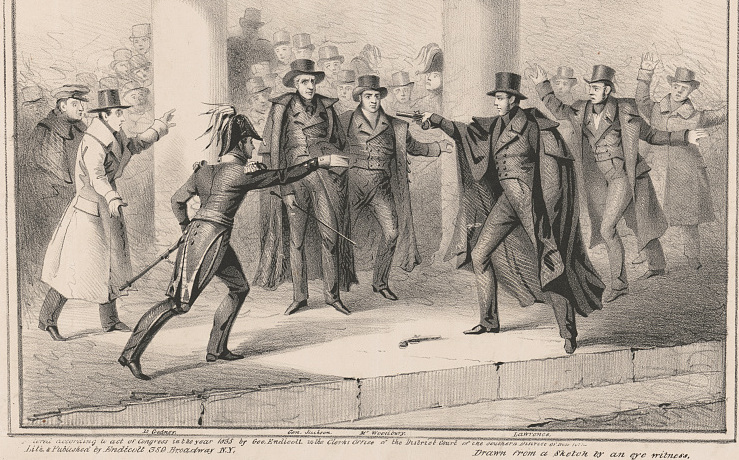
An 1835 lithograph of the attempted assassination of Andrew Jackson, published by Endicott & Co.

On May 6, 1833, Robert B. Randolph struck Jackson in the face with his hand because Jackson had ordered Randolph's dismissal from the navy for embezzlement. Jackson declined to press charges. While Jackson was leaving the United States Capitol on January 30, 1835, Richard Lawrence, an unemployed house painter from England, aimed a pistol at him, which misfired. Lawrence pulled out a second pistol, which also misfired. Jackson attacked Lawrence with his cane until others intervened to restrain Lawrence, who was later found not guilty by reason of insanity and institutionalized. This was the first attempt to assassinate a sitting president in United States history.

=== Slavery ===
By the 1830s, abolitionism in the United States had become a major reform movement, one often targeted by pro-slavery violence. Federal troops were used to crush Nat Turner's Rebellion in 1831, though Jackson ordered them withdrawn immediately afterwards despite the petition of local citizens for them to remain for protection. Jackson considered the issue of slavery divisive to the nation and to the delicate alliances of the Democratic Party.

Jackson's view was challenged when the American Anti-Slavery Society agitated for abolition by sending anti-slavery tracts through the postal system into the South in 1835. Jackson condemned the abolitionists as "monsters" and said they should die, arguing that their antislavery activism would encourage sectionalism and destroy the Union. The tracts provoked riots in Charleston, and pro-slavery Southerners demanded that the postal service ban distribution of the materials. Jackson responded by directing that antislavery tracts should be sent only to subscribers, whose names could be made publicly known, exposing them to reprise. That December, Jackson called on Congress to prohibit the circulation through the South of "incendiary publications intended to instigate the slaves to insurrection".

=== Foreign affairs ===
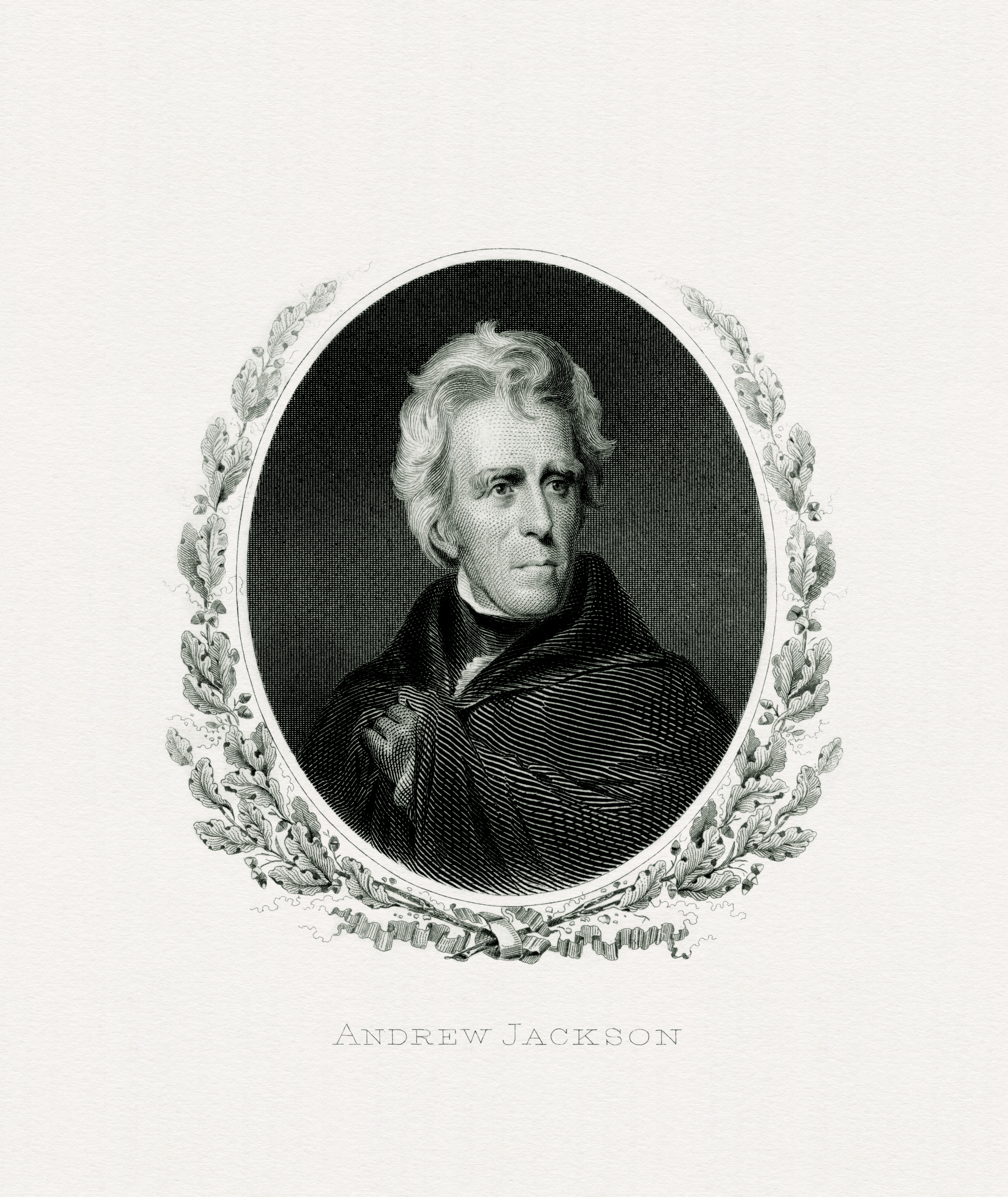
Engraved portrait of Jackson as president by the Bureau of Engraving and Printing. This portrait has appeared on the $20 bill since 1929.

The Jackson administration successfully negotiated a trade agreement with Siam, the first Asian country to form a trade agreement with the U.S. The administration also made trade agreements with Great Britain, Spain, Russia, and the Ottoman Empire.

In his First Annual Message to Congress, Jackson addressed the issues of spoliation claims, demands of compensation for the capture of American ships and sailors by foreign nations during the Napoleonic Wars. Using a combination of bluster and tact, he successfully settled these claims with Denmark, Portugal, and Spain, but he had difficulty collecting spoliation claims from France, which was unwilling to pay an indemnity agreed to in an earlier treaty. Jackson asked Congress in 1834 to authorize reprisals against French property if the country failed to make payment, as well as to arm for defense. In response, France put its Caribbean fleet on a wartime footing. Both sides wanted to avoid a conflict, but the French wanted an apology for Jackson's belligerence. In his 1835 Annual Message to the Congress, Jackson asserted that he refused to apologize, but stated that he did not intend to "menace or insult the Government of France". The French were assuaged and agreed to pay $5,000,000 (equivalent to $156,048,400 in 2025) to settle the claims.

Since the early 1820s, large numbers of Americans had been immigrating into Texas, a territory of the newly independent nation of Mexico. As early as 1824, Jackson had supported acquiring the region for the United States. In 1829, he attempted to purchase it, but Mexico did not want to sell. By 1830, there were twice as many settlers from the United States as from Mexico, leading to tensions with the Mexican government that started the Texas Revolution. During the conflict, settlers covertly obtained weapons and money from the United States, defeating the Mexican military in April 1836 and declaring the region an independent country, the Republic of Texas. The new Republic asked Jackson to recognize and annex it. Although Jackson wanted to do so, he was hesitant because he was unsure it could maintain independence from Mexico. He also was concerned because Texas had legalized slavery, which was an issue that could divide the Democrats during the 1836 election. Jackson recognized the Republic of Texas on the last full day of his presidency, March 3, 1837.

=== Judiciary ===
Jackson appointed six justices to the Supreme Court. Most were undistinguished. Jackson nominated Roger B. Taney in January 1835 to the Court in reward for his services, but the nomination failed to win Senate approval.

When Chief Justice Marshall died in 1835, Jackson again nominated Taney for Chief Justice; he was confirmed by the new Senate, serving as Chief Justice until 1864. He was regarded with respect during his career on the bench, but he is most remembered for his widely condemned decision in Dred Scott v. Sandford. On the last day of his presidency, Jackson signed the Judiciary Act of 1837, which created two new Supreme Court seats and reorganized the federal circuit courts.

=== States admitted to the Union ===
Two new states were admitted into the Union during Jackson's presidency: Arkansas (June 15, 1836) and Michigan (January 26, 1837). Both states increased Democratic power in Congress and helped Van Buren win the presidency in 1836, as new states tended to support the party that had done the most to admit them.

== Post-presidency and death (1837–1845) ==
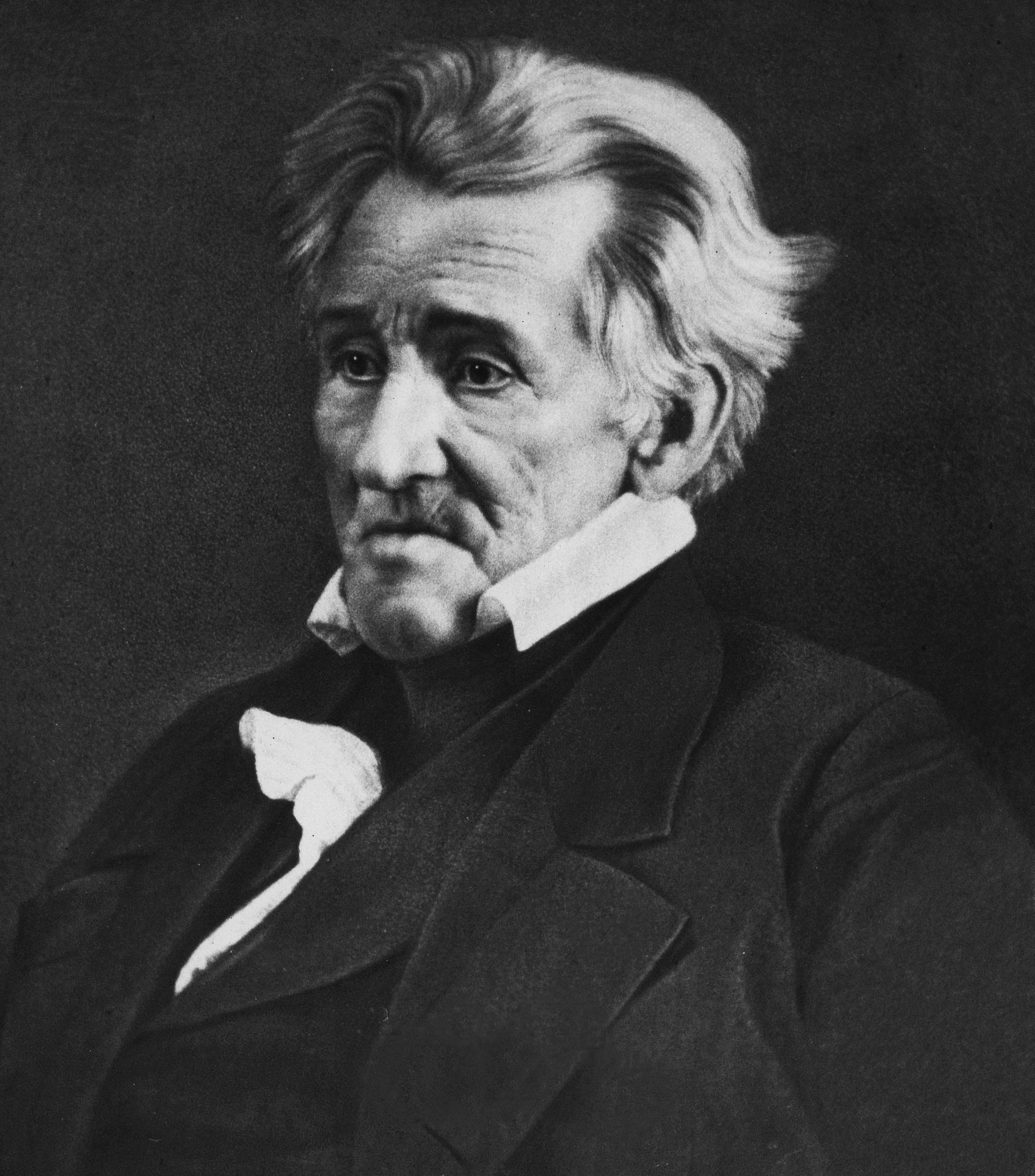
A mezzotint after a daguerreotype of Jackson in 1845

Jackson's presidency ended on March 4, 1837. Jackson left Washington, D.C., three days later, retiring to the Hermitage in Nashville, where he remained influential in national and state politics. To reduce the inflation caused by the Panic of 1837, Jackson supported an Independent Treasury system that would restrict the government from printing paper money and require it to hold its money in silver and gold.

During the 1840 presidential election, Jackson campaigned for Van Buren in Tennessee, but Van Buren had become unpopular during the continuing depression. The Whig Party nominee, William Henry Harrison, won the election using a campaign style similar to that of the Democrats: Van Buren was depicted as an uncaring aristocrat, while Harrison's war record was glorified, and he was portrayed as a man of the people. Harrison won the 1840 election and the Whigs captured majorities in both houses of Congress, but Harrison died a month into his term, and was replaced by his vice president, former Democrat John Tyler. Jackson was encouraged because Tyler was not bound to party loyalties and praised him when he vetoed two Whig-sponsored bills to establish a new national bank in 1841.

Jackson lobbied for the annexation of Texas. He was concerned that the British could use it as a base to threaten the United States and insisted that it was part of the Louisiana Purchase. Tyler signed a treaty of annexation in April 1844, but it became associated with the expansion of slavery and was not ratified. Van Buren, who had been Jackson's preferred candidate for the Democratic Party in the 1844 presidential election, had opposed annexation. Disappointed by Van Buren, Jackson convinced fellow Tennessean James K. Polk, who was then set to be Van Buren's running mate, to run as the Democratic Party's presidential nominee instead. Polk defeated Van Buren for the nomination and won the general election against Jackson's old enemy, Henry Clay. Meanwhile, the Senate passed a bill to annex Texas, and it was signed on March 1, 1845.

Jackson died of dropsy, tuberculosis, and heart failure at 78 years of age on June 8, 1845. His deathbed was surrounded by family, friends, and slaves, and he was recorded to have said, "Do not cry; I hope to meet you all in Heaven—yes, all in Heaven, white and black." He was buried in the same tomb as his wife Rachel.

== Personal life ==
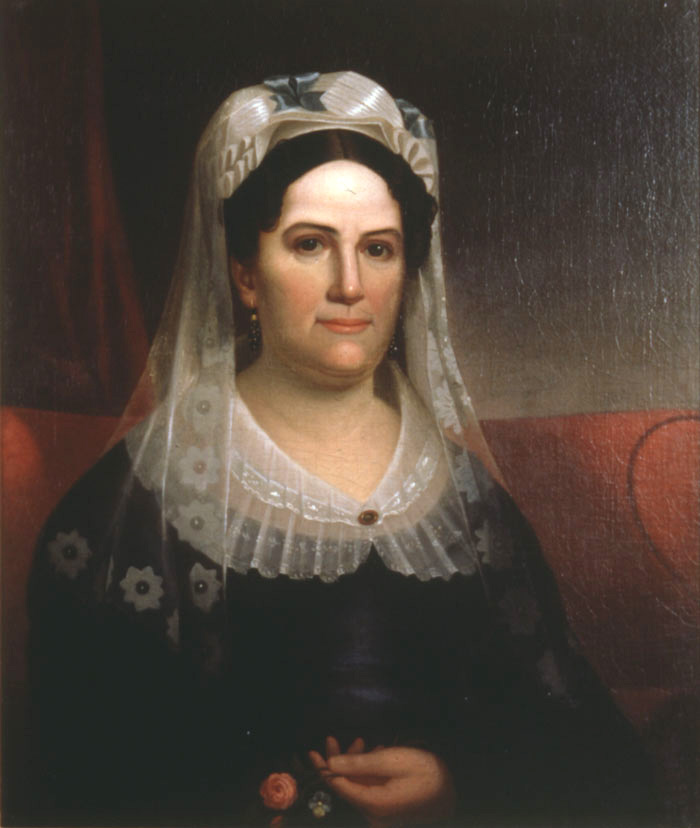
Posthumous portrait of Jackson's wife Rachel, by Ralph Eleaser Whiteside Earl now housed at The Hermitage in Nashville

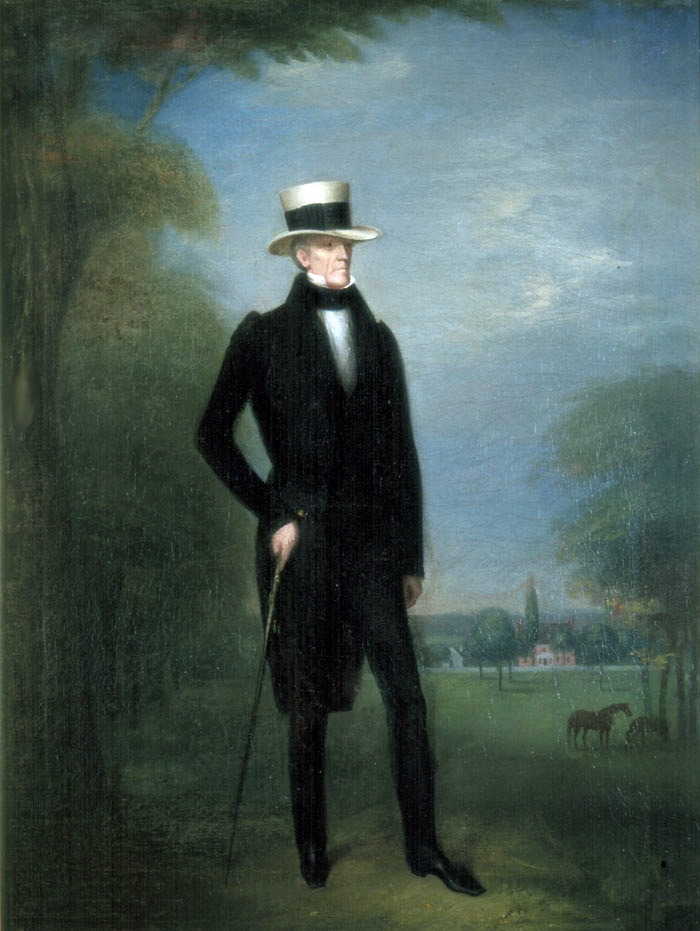
Jackson depicted in 1831 as a Tennessee Gentleman by Ralph Eleaser Whiteside Earl, now housed at The Hermitage in Nashville

=== Family ===
Jackson and Rachel had no children together but adopted Andrew Jackson Jr., the son of Rachel's brother Severn Donelson. The Jacksons also acted as guardians for the children of another of Rachel's brothers, Samuel Donelson: John Samuel, Daniel Smith Donelson, and Andrew Jackson Donelson. They were also guardians for A. J. Hutchings, Rachel's orphaned grandnephew, and the orphaned children of a friend, Edward Butler—Caroline, Eliza, Edward, and Anthony—who lived with the Jacksons after their father died. There were also three Indigenous members of Jackson's household: Lyncoya, Theodore, and Charley.

For the only time in U.S. history, two women acted simultaneously as unofficial first lady for the widower Jackson. Rachel's niece Emily Donelson, the wife of Andrew Jackson Donelson who was acting as Jackson's private secretary, initially served as hostess at the White House. The president and Emily became estranged for over a year during the Petticoat affair, and she was replaced by Sarah Yorke Jackson, the wife of Andrew Jackson Jr in 1834. Eventually, the president and Emily reconciled and Emily became co-hostess with Sarah. Sarah took over all hostess duties after Emily died from tuberculosis in 1836.

=== Temperament ===
Jackson had a reputation for being short-tempered and violent, which terrified his opponents. He was able to use his temper strategically to accomplish what he wanted. He could keep it in check when necessary: his behavior was friendly and urbane when he went to Washington as senator during the campaign leading up to the 1824 election. According to Van Buren, he remained calm in times of difficulty and made his decisions deliberatively.

He had the tendency to take things personally. If someone crossed him, he would often become obsessed with crushing them. For example, on the last day of his presidency, Jackson declared he had only two regrets: that he had not shot Henry Clay or hanged John C. Calhoun. He also had a strong sense of loyalty. He considered threats to his friends as threats to himself, but he demanded unquestioning loyalty in return.

Jackson was self-confident, without projecting a sense of self-importance. This self-confidence gave him the ability to persevere in the face of adversity. Once he decided on a plan of action, he would adhere to it. His reputation for being both quick-tempered and confident worked to his advantage; it misled opponents to see him as simple and direct, leading them to often understimate his political shrewdness.

=== Religion ===
In 1838, Jackson became an official member of the First Presbyterian Church in Nashville. Both his mother and his wife had been devout Presbyterians all their lives, but Jackson stated that he had postponed officially entering the church until after his retirement to avoid accusations that he had done so for political reasons.

== Legacy ==
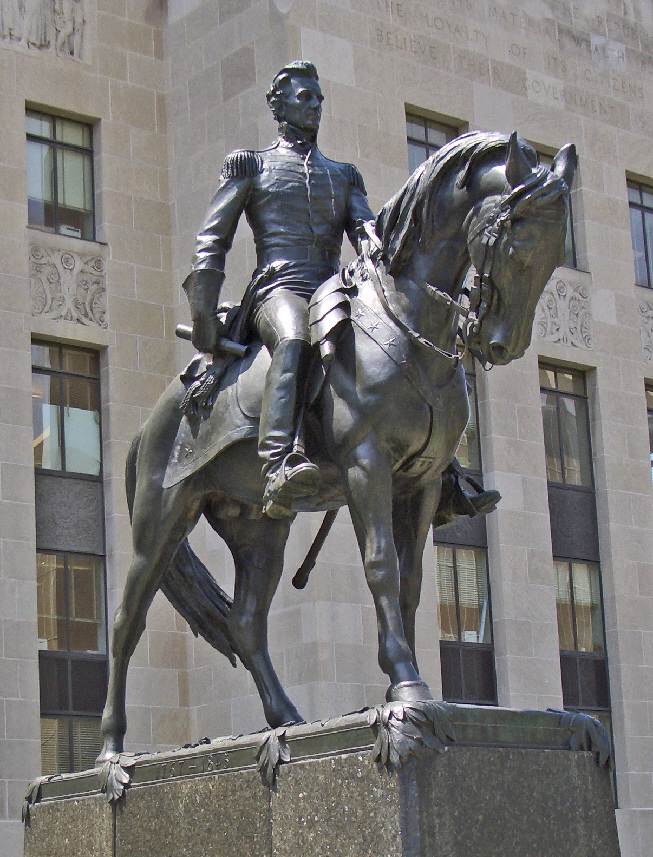
The equestrian statue of Jackson commissioned by Judge Harry S. Truman and developed by Charles Keck in 1934 on display in front of the Jackson County Courthouse in Kansas City, Missouri

Jackson's legacy is controversial and polarizing. His contemporary, Alexis de Tocqueville, depicted him as the spokesman of the majority and their passions. He has been variously described as a frontiersman personifying the independence of the American West, a slave-owning member of the Southern gentry, and a populist who promoted faith in the wisdom of the ordinary citizen. He has been represented as a statesman who substantially advanced the spirit of democracy, and upheld the foundations of American constitutionalism, as well as an autocratic demagogue who crushed political opposition and trampled the law.

In the 1920s, Jackson's rise to power became associated with the idea of the "common man". This idea defined the age as a populist rejection of social elites and a vindication of every person's value independent of class and status. Jackson was seen as its personification, an individual free of societal constraints who can achieve great things. In 1945, Arthur M. Schlesinger Jr.'s influential The Age of Jackson redefined Jackson's legacy through the lens of Franklin D. Roosevelt's New Deal, describing the common man as a member of the working class struggling against exploitation by business concerns.

Jackson's legacy has been variously used by later presidents. Abraham Lincoln referenced Jackson's ideas when negotiating the challenges to the Union that he faced during 1861, including Jackson's understanding of the constitution during the nullification crisis and the president's right to interpret the constitution. Franklin D. Roosevelt used Jackson to redefine the Democratic Party, describing him as a defender of the exploited and downtrodden and as a fighter for social justice and human rights. The members of the Progressive Party of 1948 to 1955 saw themselves as the heirs to Jackson. Donald Trump used Jackson's legacy to present himself as the president of the common man, praising Jackson for saving the country from a rising aristocracy and protecting American workers with a tariff. In 2016, Barack Obama's administration announced it was removing Jackson's portrait from the $20 bill and replacing it with one of Harriet Tubman. Though the plan was put on hold during Trump's first presidency, Joe Biden's administration resumed it in 2021.

The debate over Jackson's legacy—his significance as an outsider who represents the ultimate triumph of the "common man" or as a symbol of undemocratic racism and brutality—continues into the 21st century. The Indian Removal Act has been described as ethnic cleansing. To achieve the goal of separating Native Americans from the whites, coercive force such as threats and bribes were used to effect removal and unauthorized military force was used when there was resistance, as in the case of the Second Seminole War. The act also has been discussed in the context of genocide, and its role in the long-term destruction of Native American societies and their cultures continues to be debated. In the last decade, white supremacist groups have used Jackson's image in their literature, and in 2020, anti-racist protestors in Washington, D.C. attempted to pull down the Andrew Jackson statue in Lafayette Square.

Jackson was historically rated highly as a president, but his reputation began to decline in the 1960s. His contradictory legacy is shown in scholarly rankings. In a C-SPAN poll of historians, Jackson was ranked the 13th in 2009, 18th in 2017, and 22nd in 2021. The Presidential Greatness Project, which surveys political scientists, found that Jackson was rated the 9th greatest president in 2014, falling to 15th in 2018 and 21st in 2024, but he was rated the third most polarizing president after Barack Obama and George W. Bush in 2014 and the second most polarizing after Donald Trump in both 2018 and 2024.

== Writings ==
- Feller, Daniel; Coens, Thomas; Moss, Laura-Eve; Moser, Harold D.; Alexander, Erik B.; Smith, Sam B.; Owsley, Harriet C.; Hoth, David R; Hoemann, George H.; McPherson, Sharon; Clift, J. Clint; Wells, Wyatt C., eds. (1980–2023). The Papers of Andrew Jackson. University of Tennessee. (12 volumes to date; 17 volumes projected). Ongoing project to print all of Jackson's papers.

- Vol. I, (1770–1803); Vol. II, (1804–1813); Vol. III, (1814–1815); Vol. IV, (1816–1820); Vol. V, (1821–1824); Vol. VI, (1825–1828); Vol. VII, (1829); Vol. VIII, (1830); Vol. IX, (1831); Vol. X, (1832); Vol. XI, (1833); Vol. XII, (1834)

- Bassett, John S., ed. (1926–1935). Correspondence of Andrew Jackson. Carnegie Institution. (7 volumes).

- Vol. I (to April 30, 1814); Vol. II (1814–1819); Vol. 3 (1820–1828); Vol. 4 (1827–1832); Vol. 5 (1833–1838); Vol. 6 (1839–1845); Vol. 7 (Index)

- Richardson, James D., ed. (1897). "Andrew Jackson". Compilation of the Messages and Papers of the Presidents. Vol. III. Bureau of National Literature and Art. pp. 996–1359. Reprints Jackson's major messages and reports.
- Jackson, Andrew; Ely, James W.; Brown, Theodore (1987). The Legal Papers of Andrew Jackson. Knoxville: University of Tennessee Press.

== See also ==
- Portraits of Andrew Jackson
- List of presidents of the United States
- List of presidents of the United States by previous experience
- List of presidents of the United States who owned slaves

== Bibliography ==
=== Biographies ===
- Brands, H. W. (2005). Andrew Jackson: His Life and Times. New York, NY: Knopf Doubleday Publishing Group. ISBN 978-1-4000-3072-9. OCLC 1285478081.
- Brown, David S. (2022). The First Populist: The Defiant Life of Andrew Jackson. New York, NY: Simon & Schuster. ISBN 978-1-9821-9109-2. OCLC 1303813425.
- Cheathem, Mark R. (2014a). Andrew Jackson: Southerner (Ebook). LSU Press. ISBN 9780807151006. OCLC 858995561.
- Latner, Richard B. (2002). "Andrew Jackson". In Graff, Henry (ed.). The Presidents: A Reference History (3 ed.). New York, NY: Charles Scribner's Sons. pp. 106–127. ISBN 978-0-684-31226-2. OCLC 49029341.
- Meacham, Jon (2008). American Lion: Andrew Jackson in the White House. New York, NY: Random House Publishing Group. ISBN 978-0-8129-7346-4. OCLC 1145796050.
- Remini, Robert V. (1977). Andrew Jackson and the Course of American Empire, 1767–1821. New York, NY: Harper & Row Publishers, Inc. ISBN 978-0-8018-5912-0. OCLC 1145801830.
- Remini, Robert V. (1981). Andrew Jackson and the Course of American Freedom, 1822–1832. New York, NY: Harper & Row Publishers, Inc. ISBN 978-0-8018-5913-7. OCLC 1145807972.
- Remini, Robert V. (1984). Andrew Jackson and the Course of American Democracy, 1833–1845. New York, NY: Harper & Row Publishers, Inc. ISBN 978-0-8018-5913-7. OCLC 1285459723.
- Wilentz, Sean (2005). Andrew Jackson. New York, NY: Henry Holt and Company. ISBN 978-0-8050-6925-9. OCLC 863515036.

=== Books ===
- Adams, Sean P. (2013). "Introduction: The President and his Era". In Adams, Sean P. (ed.). A Companion to the Era of Andrew Jackson. Wiley. pp. 1–11. ISBN 9781444335415. OCLC 1152040405.
- Aptheker, Herbert (1974) [1943]. "The Turner Cataclysm and Some Repercussions". American Negro Slave Revolts. International Publishers. pp. 293–394. ISBN 9780717800032. OCLC 1028031914.
- Baptist, Edward E. (2016). The Half has Never Been Told: Slavery and the Making of American Capitalism. New York, NY: Basic Books. ISBN 978-0-465-00296-2. OCLC 1302085747.
- Booraem, Hendrik (2001). Young Hickory: The Making of Andrew Jackson. Lanham, MD: Taylor Trade Publishing. ISBN 978-0-8783-3263-2.
- Boller, Paul F. Jr. (2004). Presidential Campaigns: From George Washington to George W. Bush. New York, NY: Oxford University Press. ISBN 978-0-19516-716-0. OCLC 1285570008.
- Borneman, Walter R. (2008). Polk: The Man Who Transformed the Presidency and America. New York, NY: Random House. ISBN 978-1-4000-6560-8. OCLC 1150943134.
- Brands, Henry W. (2008). Traitor to his Class: The Privileged Life and radical Presidency of Franklin Delano Roosevelt. Doubleday. ISBN 9780385519588. OCLC 759509803.
- Breen, Patrick H. (2015). The Land Shall be Deluged in Blood : A New History of the Nat Turner Revolt. Oxford University Press. ISBN 9780199828005. OCLC 929856251.
- Burstein, Andrew (2003). The Passions of Andrew Jackson. Knopf. ISBN 0375714049. OCLC 1225864865.
- Cave, Alfred A. (2017). Sharp Knife: Andrew Jackson and the American Indians. ABC-CLIO. ISBN 9781440860409. OCLC 987437631.
- Cheathem, Mark R. (2013). ""The Shape of Democracy": Historical Interpretations of Jacksonian Democracy". In McKnight, Brian D.; Humphreys, James S. (eds.). Interpreting American History: The Age of Andrew Jackson. Kent State University Press. pp. 1–21. ISBN 9781606350980. OCLC 700709151.
- Clark, Thomas D.; Guice, John D. W. (1996). The Old Southwest, 1765–1830: Frontiers in conflict. University of Oklahoma Press. ISBN 9780806128368. OCLC 1285743152.
- Dickey, J. D. (2022). The Republic of Violence: The Tormented Rise of Abolition in Andrew Jackson's America. Pegasus Books. ISBN 978-1643139289.
- Durham, Walter T. (1990). Before Tennessee: the Southwest Territory, 1790–1796: a narrative history of the Territory of the United States South of the River Ohio. Piney Flats, TN: Rocky Mount Historical Association. ISBN 978-0-9678-3071-1.
- Ellis, Richard E. (1974). "Andrew Jackson:1829-1837". In Woodward, C. Vann (ed.). Responses of the Presidents to Charges of Misconduct. Dell. pp. 51–656. OCLC 1036817744.
- Ellis, Richard E. (1989). The Union at Risk: Jacksonian Democracy, States' Rights, and the Nullification Crisis. Oxford University Press. ISBN 9780195345155. OCLC 655900280.
- Feerick, John D. (1965). From Failing Hands: the Story of Presidential Succession. New York City: Fordham University Press.
- Fish, Carl R. (1927). The Rise of the Common Man 1830–1850. MacMillian. OCLC 1151151619.
- Freehling, William (1966). Prelude to Civil War: The Nullification Controversy in South Carolina, 1816–1836. Oxford: Oxford University Press. ISBN 9780195076813. OCLC 1151067281.
- Freehling, William W. (2008). "Andrew Jackson, Great President (?)". In Finkelman, Paul; Kennon, Donald R. (eds.). Congress and the Emergence of Sectionalism: From the Missouri Compromise to the Age of Jackson. Perspectives on the History of Congress, 1801–1877. Ohio University Press. pp. 133–151. ISBN 9780821417836. OCLC 613401991.
- Garrison, Tim Allen (2002). The Legal Ideology of Removal: The Southern Judiciary and the Sovereignty of Native American Nations. Athens, GA: University of Georgia Press. ISBN 978-0-8203-3417-2. OCLC 53956489.
- Gatell, Frank Otto (1967). The Jacksonians and the Money Power. Chicago, Rand McNally. OCLC 651767466.
- Gilo-Whitaker, Dina (2019). As Long as Grass Grows: The Indigenous Fight for Environmental Justice, from Colonization to Standing Rock. Beacon Press. ISBN 9780807073780. OCLC 1044542033.
- Greeley, Horace (1864). The American Conflict: A History of the Great Rebellion in the United States of America, 1860-64. Its Causes, Incidents and Results. O. D. Case and Company.
- Hammond, Bray (1957). Banks and Politics in America from the Revolution to the Civil War. Princeton, NJ: Princeton University Press. OCLC 1147712456.
- Hickey, Donald R. (1989). The War of 1812: A Forgotten Conflict. University of Illinois Press. ISBN 0252060598. OCLC 1036973138.
- Howe, Daniel Walker (2007). What Hath God Wrought: the Transformation of America, 1815–1848. Oxford, NY: Oxford University Press. ISBN 978-0-19-974379-7. OCLC 646814186.
- Kakel, Carroll (2011). The American West and the Nazi East: A Comparative and Interpretive Perspective. Palgrave Macmillan. ISBN 9780230307063. OCLC 743799760.
- Kalaitzidis, Akis; Streich, Gregory W. (2011). U.S. Foreign Policy: A Documentary and Reference Guide. ABC-CLIO. ISBN 978-0-313-38375-5. OCLC 759101504.
- Lane, Carl (2014). A Nation Wholly Free: The Elimination of the National Debt in the Age of Jackson. Westholme. ISBN 9781594162091. OCLC 1150853554.
- Lansford, Tom; Woods, Thomas E., eds. (2008). Exploring American History: From Colonial Times to 1877. Vol. 10. New York: Marshall Cavendish. ISBN 978-0-7614-7758-7.
- Lynn, John A. (2019). Another Kind of War: The Nature and History of Terrorism. Yale University Press. ISBN 9780300189988. OCLC 1107042059.
- Mahon, John K. (1962). "The Treaty of Moultrie Creek, 1823". The Florida Historical Quarterly. 40 (4): 350–372. JSTOR 30139875.
- Marszalek, John F. (1997). The Petticoat Affair: Manners, Mutiny, and Sex in Andrew Jackson's White House. Free Press. ISBN 0684828014. OCLC 36767691.
- McGrane, Reginald C. (1965). The Panic of 1837. University of Chicago Press. OCLC 1150938709.
- Meyers, Marvin (1960). The Jacksonian Persuasion: Politics & Belief. Vintage Books. OCLC 1035884705.
- Missall, John; Missall, Mary Lou (2004). The Seminole Wars: America's Longest Indian Conflict. University Press of Florida. ISBN 0813027152. OCLC 1256504949.
- Moser, Harold D.; Macpherson, Sharon, eds. (1984). The Papers of Andrew Jackson, Volume II, 1804–1813. University of Tennessee Press.
- Moser, Harold D.; Hoth, David R.; Macpherson, Sharon; Reinbold, John H., eds. (1991). The Papers of Andrew Jackson, Volume III, 1814–1815. University of Tennessee Press. p. 35. "I have not heard whether Genl Coffee has taken on to him little Lyncoya-I have got another Pett-given to me by the chief Jame Fife, ... [The Indian children were probably Theodore and Charley.]"*
- Murphy, Sharon A. (2013). "The Myth and Reality of andrew Jackson's Rise in the Election of 1824". In Adams, Sean P. (ed.). A Companion to the Era of Andrew Jackson. Wiley. pp. 260–279. ISBN 9781444335415. OCLC 1152040405.
- Nester, William R. (2013). The Age of Jackson and the Art of Power. Potomac Books. ISBN 9781612346052. OCLC 857769985.
- Niven, John (1988). John C. Calhoun and the Price of Union: A Biography. Baton Rouge, LA: LSU Press. ISBN 978-0-8071-1858-0. OCLC 1035889000.
- Nowlan, Robert A. (2012). The American Presidents, Washington to Tyler. Jefferson, NC: McFarland Publishing. ISBN 978-0-7864-6336-7. OCLC 692291434.
- Ogg, Frederic Austin (1919). The Reign of Andrew Jackson; Vol. 20, Chronicles of America Series. New Haven, CT: Yale University Press. OCLC 928924919.
- Olson, James Stuart (2002). Robert L. Shadle (ed.). Encyclopedia of the Industrial Revolution in America. Westport, CT: Greenwood Press. ISBN 978-0-313-30830-7. OCLC 1033573148.
- Ostler, Jeffrey (2019). Surviving Genocide: Native Nations and the United States from the American Revolution to Bleeding Kansas. New Haven, Connecticut: Yale University Press. doi:10.12987/9780300245264. ISBN 978-0-300-24526-4.
- Owsley, Frank Lawrence Jr. (1981). Struggle for the Gulf Borderlands: The Creek War and the Battle of New Orleans, 1812-1815. University Presses of Florida. ISBN 0813006627. OCLC 1151350587.
- Parins, James W.; Littlefield, Daniel F. (2011). "Introduction". In Parins, James W.; Littlefield, Daniel F. (eds.). Encyclopedia of American Indian Removal [2 Volumes]. ABC-CLIO. ISBN 9780313360428. OCLC 720586004.
- Remini, Robert V. (1990). The Legacy of Andrew Jackson: Essays on Democracy, Indian Removal, and Slavery. Louisiana State University Press. ISBN 9780807116425. OCLC 1200479832.
- Rogin, Michael P. (1975). Fathers and Children: Andrew Jackson and the Subjugation of the American Indian. Knopf. ISBN 0394482042. OCLC 1034678255.
- Sabato, Larry; O'Connor, Karen (2002). American Government: Continuity and Change. New York: Pearson Longman. ISBN 978-0-321-31711-7. OCLC 1028046888.
- Satz, Ronald N. (1974). American Indian Policy in the Jacksonian Era. University of Nebraska. ISBN 9780803208230.
- Schlesinger, Arthur M. Jr. (1988) [1st pub. 1945]. The Age of Jackson. Little, Brown and Company. ISBN 9780316773430. OCLC 1024176654.
- Schwartz, Bernard (1993). A History of the Supreme Court. New York, NY: Oxford University Press. ISBN 978-0-19-509387-2. OCLC 1035668728.
- Smith, Justin H. (1911). The Annexation of Texas. New York, NY: MacMillan Company.
- Temin, Peter (1969). Jacksonian Economy. Norton. OCLC 1150111725.
- Turner, Frederick Jackson (1920). The Frontier in American History. Henry Holt. OCLC 1045610195.
- Unger, Harlow G. (2012). John Quincy Adams. De Capo. ISBN 9780306822650. OCLC 1035758771.
- Van Deusen, Glyndon G. (1963) [1959]. The Jacksonian Era, 1828-1848. Harper & Row. ISBN 9780061330285. OCLC 1176180758.
- Wallace, Anthony F. C. (1993). The Long, Bitter Trail: Andrew Jackson and the Indians. Hill and Wang. ISBN 9780809066315. OCLC 1150209732.
- Ward, John. W. (1962). "The Age of the Common Man". In Higham, John (ed.). The Reconstruction of American History. Hutchison. pp. 82–97. OCLC 1151080132.

=== Journal articles and dissertations ===
- Anderson, Gary Clayton (2016). "The Native Peoples of the American West: Genocide or Ethnic Cleansing?". Western Historical Quarterly. 47 (4). Oxford University Press: 416. doi:10.1093/whq/whw126. ISSN 0043-3810. JSTOR 26782720.
- Bergeron, Paul H. (1976). "The nullification controversy revisited". Tennessee Historical Quarterly. 35 (3): 263–275. JSTOR 42623589.
- Barna, Elizabeth K. (2020). Between Plantations, President, and Public: Institutional Polysemy and the Representation of Slavery, Genocide, and Democracy at Andrew Jackson's Hermitage (PhD). Vanderbilt University.
- Berutti, Ronald A. (1992). "The Cherokee Cases: The Fight to Save the Supreme Court and the Cherokee Indians". American Indian Law Review. 17 (1): 291–308. doi:10.2307/20068726. ISSN 0094-002X. JSTOR 20068726.
- Brogdon, Matthew S. (2011). "Defending the Union: Andrew Jackson's Nullifaction Proclamation and American federalism". Review of Politics. 73 (2): 245–273. doi:10.1017/S0034670511000064. JSTOR 42623589. S2CID 145679939.
- Campbell, Stephen W. (2016). "Funding the Bank War: Nicholas Biddle and the public relations campaign to recharter the second bank of the U.S., 1828–1832". American Nineteenth Century History. 17 (3): 279–299. doi:10.1080/14664658.2016.1230930. S2CID 152280055.
- Cave, Alfred A. (2003). "Abuse of Power: Andrew Jackson and the Indian Removal Act of 1830". The Historian. 65 (6): 1330–1353. doi:10.1111/j.0018-2370.2003.00055.x. JSTOR 2205966.
- Cheathem, Mark R. (2011). "Andrew Jackson, Slavery, and Historians" (PDF). History Compass. 9 (4): 326–338. doi:10.1111/j.1478-0542.2011.00763.x. ISSN 1478-0542. Archived from the original (PDF) on October 12, 2022.
- Cheathem, Mark (2014). "Frontiersman or Southern Gentleman? Newspaper Coverage of Andrew Jackson during the 1828 Presidential Campaign". The Readex Report. 9 (3). Archived from the original on January 12, 2015.
- Carson, James T. (2008). ""The obituary of nations": Ethnic cleansing, memory, and the origins of the Old South". Southern Cultures. 14 (4): 6–31. doi:10.1353/scu.0.0026. JSTOR 26391777. S2CID 144154298.
- Clifton, Frances (1952). "John Overton as Andrew Jackson's friend". Tennessee Historical Quarterly. 11 (1): 23–40. JSTOR 42621095.
- Cole, Donald B. (1986). "Review: The Age of Jackson: After Forty Years". Reviews in American History. 14 (1): 149–159. doi:10.2307/2702131. JSTOR 2702131.
- Cole, Donald P. (1997). "A yankee in Kentucky: The early years of Amos Kendall, 1789–1828". Proceedings of the Massachusetts Historical Society. Third Series. 109 (1): 24–36. JSTOR 25081127.
- Davis, Ethan (2010). "An administrative Trail of Tears: Indian removal". The American Journal of Legal History. 50 (1): 1330–1353. doi:10.1093/ajlh/50.1.49. JSTOR 2205966.
- Davis, Karl (2002). ""Remember Fort Mims": Reinterpreting the origins of the Creek War". Journal of the Early Republic. 22 (4): 611–636. doi:10.2307/3124760. JSTOR 3124760.
- Ely, James W. Jr. (1981). "Andrew Jackson as Tennessee state court judge, 1798–1804". Tennessee Historical Quarterly. 40 (2): 144–157. JSTOR 42626180.
- Ericson, David F. (1995). "The nullification crisis, American republicanism, and the Force Bill debate". Journal of Southern History. 81 (2): 249–270. doi:10.2307/2211577. JSTOR 2211577.
- Friedrich, Carl Joachim (1937). "The rise and decline of the spoils tradition". The Annals of the American Academy of Political and Social Science. 189: 10–16. doi:10.1177/000271623718900103. JSTOR 1019439. S2CID 144735397.
- Gammon, Samuel G. (1922). The Presidential Campaign of 1832 (Thesis). Johns Hopkins University. OCLC 1050835838.
- Gatell, Frank O. (1964). "Spoils of the Bank War: Political Bias in the Selection of Pet Banks". The American Historical Review. 70 (1): 35–58. doi:10.2307/1842097. JSTOR 1842097.
- Gilman, Stuart C. (1995). "Presidential Ethics and the Ethics of the Presidency". The Annals of the American Academy of Political and Social Science. 537: 58–75. doi:10.1177/0002716295537000006. JSTOR 1047754. S2CID 143876977.
- Hall, Kermit (1992). "Judiciary Act of 1837". The Oxford Companion to the Supreme Court of the United States. Oxford University Press. p. 475. ISBN 0195058356. OCLC 1036760206.
- Harris, Lester (1958). "The Cession of Florida and John Quincy Adams, Secretary of State, U. S. A.". The Florida Historical Quarterly. 36 (3): 223–238. JSTOR 30139044.
- Haveman, Christopher D. (2009). The Removal of the Creek Indians from the Southeast, 1825–1838 (PDF) (PhD). Auburn University. Archived from the original (PDF) on September 26, 2022.
- Heidler, David S. (1993). "The politics of national aggression: Congress and the First Seminole War". Journal of the Early Republic. 13 (4): 501–530. doi:10.2307/3124558. JSTOR 3124558.
- Henig, Gerald S. (1969). "The Jacksonian attitude toward Abolitionism". Tennessee Historical Quarterly. 28 (1): 42–56. JSTOR 1901307.
- Howell, William Huntting (2010). ""Read, Pause, and Reflect!!"". Journal of the Early Republic. 30 (2): 293–300. doi:10.1353/jer.0.0149. JSTOR 40662272. S2CID 144448483.
- Jackson, Carlton (1966). "The internal improvement vetoes of Andrew Jackson". Tennessee Historical Quarterly. 25 (3): 531–550. doi:10.2307/3115344. JSTOR 3115344. S2CID 55379727.
- Jackson, Carlton (1967). "--Another Time, Another Place--: The attempted assassination of President Andrew Jackson". Tennessee Historical Quarterly. 26 (2): 184–190. JSTOR 42622937.
- Kanon, Thomas (1999). ""A slow, laborious slaughter": The battle of Horseshoe Bend". Tennessee Historical Quarterly. 58 (1): 2–15. JSTOR 42627446.
- Koenig, Louis W. (1964). "American Politics: The First Half-Century". Current History. 47 (278): 193–198. doi:10.1525/curh.1964.47.278.193. JSTOR 45311183.
- Knodell, Jane (2006). "Rethinking the Jacksonian economy: The impact of the 1832 bank veto on commercial banking". Journal of Economic History. 66 (3): 641–574. doi:10.1017/S0022050706000258. JSTOR 3874852. S2CID 155084029.
- Mahon, John K. (1998). "The First Seminole War: November 21, 1817-May24,1818". Florida Historical Quarterly. 77 (1): 62–67. JSTOR 30149093.
- Latner, Richard B. (1978). "The Kitchen Cabinet and Andrew Jackson's advisory system". The Journal of American History. 65 (2): 367–388. doi:10.2307/1894085. JSTOR 1894085.
- McLoughlin, William G. (1986). "Georgia's role in instigating compulsory Indian removal". The Georgia Historical Quarterly. 70 (4): 605–632. JSTOR 40581582.
- Morgan, William G. (1969). "The origin and development of the congressional nominating caucus". Proceedings of the American Philosophical Society. 113 (2): 184–196. JSTOR 985965.
- Miles, Edwin A. (1992). "After John Marshall's Decision: Worcester v. Georgia and the Nullification Crisis". Journal of Southern History. 39 (4): 519–544. doi:10.2307/2205966. JSTOR 2205966.
- Moser, Harold D.; MacPherson, Sharon, eds. (1984). "Editorial note on 'Court Minutes in State v. Andrew Jackson '". The Papers of Andrew Jackson, Volume II, 1804–1813. University of Tennessee Press. pp. 172–174. ISBN 978-0-8704-9441-3.
- Nettels, Curtis (1925). "The Mississippi Valley and the federal judiciary, 1807-1837". The Mississippi Valley Historical Review. 12 (2): 202–226. doi:10.2307/1886513. JSTOR 1886513.
- Owsley, Harriet Chappel (1977). "The marriages of Rachel Donelson". Tennessee Historical Quarterly. 36 (4): 479–492. JSTOR 42625784.
- Parsons, Lynn Hudson (1973). ""A perpetual harrow upon my feelings": John Quincy Adams and the American Indian". The New England Quarterly. 46 (3): 339–379. doi:10.2307/364198. JSTOR 364198.
- Perdue, Theda (2012). "The Legacy of Indian Removal". Journal of Southern History. 78 (1): 3–36. JSTOR 23247455.
- Perkins, Edwin J. (1987). "Lost opportunities for compromise in the Bank War: A reassessment of jackson's veto message". Business History Review. 61 (4): 531–550. doi:10.2307/3115344. JSTOR 3115344. S2CID 55379727.
- Phillips, Kim T. (1976). "The Pennsylvania origins of the Jackson movement". Political Science Quarterly. 91 (3): 489–501. doi:10.2307/2148938. JSTOR 2148938.
- Porter, Kenneth Wiggins (1951). "Negroes and the Seminole War, 1817-1818". Journal of Negro History. 36 (3): 249–280. doi:10.2307/2715671. JSTOR 2715671. S2CID 150360181.
- Ratcliffe, Donald J. (2000). "The Nullification Crisis, Southern discontents, and the American political process". American Nineteenth Century History. 1 (2): 1–30. doi:10.1080/14664650008567014. S2CID 144242176.
- Remini, Robert V. (1991). "Andrew Jackson's Adventures on the Natchez Trace". Southern Quarterly. 29 (4). Hattiesburg, Mississippi: University of Southern Mississippi: 35–42. ISSN 0038-4496. OCLC 1644229.
- Rousseau, Peter L. (2002). "Jacksonian money policy, specie flows, and the panic of 1837". The Journal of Economic History. 82 (2): 457–488. doi:10.1017/S0022050702000566. JSTOR 2698187.
- Rottinghaus, Brandon; Eady, Gregory; Vaughn, Justin S. (2020). "Presidential greatness in a polarized era: Results from the latest presidential greatness survey". PS: Political Science & Politics. 53 (3): 413–420. doi:10.1017/S1049096520000177.
- Rottinghaus, Brandon; Vaughn, Justin S. (2017). "Presidential Greatness and Political Science: Assessing the 2014 APSA Presidents and Executive Politics Section Presidential Greatness Survey". PS: Political Science & Politics. 50 (3): 824–830. doi:10.1017/S1049096517000671. S2CID 157101605.
- Rottinghaus, Brandon; Vaughn, Justin S. (2024). "Official Results of the 2024 Presidential Greatness Project Expert Survey" (PDF). Presidential Greatness Project (white paper). Archived from the original (PDF) on January 16, 2025. Alt URL
- Schmidt, Louis Bernard (1955). "Andrew Jackson and the Agrarian West". Current History. 28 (166): 321–330. doi:10.1525/curh.1955.28.166.321. JSTOR 45308841. S2CID 249685683.
- Sellers, Charles G. Jr. (1958). "Andrew Jackson versus the Historians". Mississippi Valley Historical Review. 44 (4): 615–634. doi:10.2307/1886599. JSTOR 1886599.
- Sellers, Charles G. Jr. (1954). "Banking and politics in Jackson's Tennessee, 1817–1827". Mississippi Valley Historical Review. 41 (1): 61–84. doi:10.2307/1898150. JSTOR 1898150.
- Smith, Jeff (2005). "Lords (and ladies) of misrule: Carnival, scandal, and satire in the age of Andrew Jackson". Studies in American Humor. New Series 3 (12): 52–82. JSTOR 42573468.
- Somit, Albert (1948). "Andrew Jackson: Legend and Reality". Tennessee Historical Quarterly. 7 (4): 291–313. JSTOR 42620991.
- Stenberg, Richard R. (1934). "The Texas schemes of Jackson and Houston, 1829–1836". The Southwestern Social Science Quarterly. 15 (3): 229–250. JSTOR 42879202.
- Thomas, Robert C. (1976). "Andrew Jackson versus France: American policy towards France, 1834–1836". Tennessee Historical Quarterly. 35 (1): 457–488. JSTOR 42623553.
- Thompson, Sheneese; Barchiesi, Franco (2018). "Harriet Tubman and Andrew Jackson on the Twenty-Dollar Bill: A Monstrous Intimacy". Open Cultural Studies. 2: 417–429. doi:10.1515/culture-2018-0038. S2CID 166210849.
- Timberlake, Richard H. (1965). "The Specie Circular and Sales of public land". The American Historical Review. 25 (3): 414–416. JSTOR 2116177.
- Tregle, Joseph G. Jr. (1981). "Andrew Jackson and the continuing Battle of New Orleans". Journal of the Early Republic. 1 (4): 373–393. doi:10.2307/3122827. JSTOR 3122827.
- Watson, Harry L. (2017). "Andrew Jackson's Populism". Tennessee Historical Quarterly. 76 (3): 236–237. JSTOR 26540290.
- Warshauer, Matthew (2006). "Andrew Jackson: Chivalric slave master". Tennessee Historical Quarterly. 65 (3): 203–229. JSTOR 42627964.
- Whapples, Robert (2014). "Were Andrew Jackson's policies "Good for the Economy"?". The Independent Review. 18 (4): 545–558. JSTOR 24563169.
- Wood, Kirsten E. (1997). ""One woman so dangerous to public morals": Gender and power in the Eaton Affair". Journal of the Early Republic. 17 (2): 237–275. doi:10.2307/3124447. JSTOR 3124447.
- Wright, J. Leitch Jr. (1968). "A note on the First Seminole War as seen by the Indians, negroes, and their British advisors". The Journal of Southern History. 34 (4): 565–576. doi:10.2307/2204387. JSTOR 2204387.

=== Primary sources ===
- Binns, John (1828). "Some account of some of the bloody deeds of General Jackson". Library of Congress. Archived from the original on January 16, 2014.
- "Expunged Senate censure motion against President Andrew Jackson, January 16, 1837". Andrew Jackson – National Archives and Records Administration, Records of the U.S. Senate. The U.S. National Archives and Records Administration. Archived from the original on November 3, 2014.
- Jackson, Andrew (1829). "Andrew Jackson's First Annual Message to Congress". The American Presidency Project. Archived from the original on February 26, 2008.
- Jackson, Andrew (1832). "President Jackson's Proclamation Regarding Nullification, December 10, 1832". The Avalon Project. Archived from the original on August 24, 2006.
- Smith, Seba (1834). The Life of Andrew Jackson, President of the United States. Illustrated with Numerous Cuts by Major Jack Downing of the Downington Militia. T. K. Greenbank. OCLC 1048300884.
- "South Carolina Ordinance of Nullification, November 24, 1832". The Avalon Project. Archived from the original on August 19, 2016.
- Taliaferro, John (1828). "Supplemental account of some of the bloody deeds of General Jackson, being a supplement to the "Coffin handbill"". Library of Congress. Archived from the original on June 28, 2017.
- de Tocqueville, Alexis (1969) [1840]. Democracy in America. Translated by Lawrence, George. Harper & Row. ISBN 9780385081702. OCLC 1148815334.

U.S. House of Representatives
| Preceded by James White as U.S. Delegate from the Southwest Territory | Member of the U.S. House of Representatives from Tennessee's at-large congressional district 1796–1797 | Succeeded by William C. C. Claiborne |
U.S. Senate
| Preceded by William Cocke | United States Senator (Class 1) from Tennessee; 1797–1798; Served alongside: Joseph Anderson | Succeeded by Daniel Smith |
| Preceded by John Williams | United States Senator (Class 2) from Tennessee; 1823–1825; Served alongside: John Eaton | Succeeded by Hugh Lawson White |
| Preceded by John Williams | Chair of the Senate Military Affairs Committee; 1823–1825 | Succeeded by William Henry Harrison |
Honorary titles
| Preceded by Richard Stockton | Baby of the Senate; 1797–1798 | Succeeded by Ray Greene |
Political offices
| Preceded by José María Coppinger as Governor of Spanish East Florida | Governor of Florida; Acting; 1821 | Succeeded by William Pope Duval |
| Preceded by John Quincy Adams | President of the United States; 1829–1837 | Succeeded by Martin Van Buren |
Masonic offices
| Preceded by Wilkins F. Tannehill | Grand Master of the Grand Lodge of Tennessee; 1822–1823 | Succeeded by Wilkins F. Tannehill |
Party political offices
| Preceded by James Monroe | Democratic-Republican nominee for President of the United States¹; 1824; Served alongside: John Quincy Adams, Henry Clay, William H. Crawford | Party dissolved |
| New political party | Democratic nominee for President of the United States; 1828, 1832 | Succeeded by Martin Van Buren |
Notes and references
1. The Democratic-Republican Party split in the 1824 election, fielding four separate candidates.
