= Rising =

Rising or RISING may refer to:

== Film and TV ==
- "Rising", 2001 television series episode, see list of Dark Angel episodes
- "Rising" (Stargate Atlantis), television series episode
- Rising (web series), an American daily news and opinion web series

== Music ==
=== Albums ===
- Rising (Donovan album), 1990
- Rising (Great White album), 2009
- Rising (Mxmtoon album), 2022
- Rising (Rainbow album), 1976
- Rising (Stuck Mojo album) or the title song, 1998
- Rising (Yoko Ono album) or the title song, 1995
- Rising, by the Go Set, 2008
- Rising, by Seraphim, 2007
- Rising, by the Up, 2010

=== Songs ===
- "Rising", by Lhasa from Lhasa, 2009
- "Rising", by Lovebites from Clockwork Immortality, 2018

== People ==
- John Rising (1756–1815), English portrait and subject painter
- Linda Rising, American author, lecturer and consultant
- Nelson Rising, American businessman
- Pop Rising (1877-1938), American Major League Baseball player in 1905

== Places ==
- Rising, Illinois, United States, an unincorporated community
- Rising City, Nebraska, United States, a village
- Rising River, a river in California

== Other uses ==
- Melbourne Rising, an Australian rugby union team
- Rising (festival), styled RISING, an annual arts festival in Melbourne, Australia
- Rising (novel), a 1976 novel by R. C. Hutchinson
- Rising Auto, a former electric vehicle brand by Chinese automobile manufacturer SAIC Motor

== See also ==
- Castle Rising, Norfolk, England
- The Rising (disambiguation)
- Rising Sun (disambiguation)
- Rise (disambiguation)
