= Tregear's Black Jokes =

1830s collection of racist cartoons

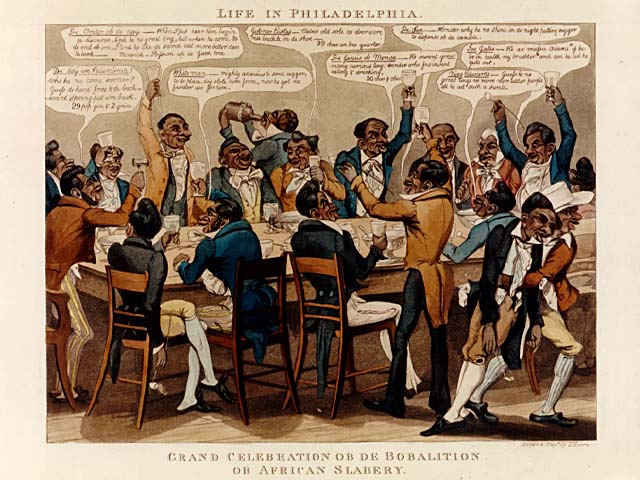
Grand Celebration ob de Bobalition ob African Slabery (1833) by I. Harris (a.k.a. Edward W. Clay)

Tregear's Black Jokes was a collection of more than 40 anti-black racist cartoons, published in London by bookseller Gabriel Shear Tregear in the 1830s. The cartoons could be purchased individually or in bound albums in Tregear's shop. Tregear published two series, Life in Philadelphia (1833) and Tregear's Black Jokes (1834), plus additional cartoons.

== Life in Philadelphia (Tregear) ==
Tregear's first series was published in 1833 under the name "Life in Philadelphia." This was the same name that had been used by American illustrator Edward Williams Clay for his 1828-1830 cartoon series, published in the United States. "The cartoons were so popular that the term Life in Philadelphia became a standard phrase to refer to fashions, trends, and—most especially—black Philadelphians' social practices and sartorial choices." In 1831, British illustrator William Summers redrew and enlarged ten of Clay's cartoons, which were engraved by Charles Hunt, and issued as color lithographs by London publisher Harrison Isaacs.

Of the twelve cartoons in Tregear's initial series, Summers designed and drew nine, two were reissues of Clay cartoons redrawn by Summers (from Isaacs), and Charles Hunt engraved all eleven as lithographs. The last cartoon was credited as "Drawn & Engraved by I. Harris." "I. Harris" is now accepted as a pseudonym for Edward Williams Clay himself. Another eight of the Clay cartoons redrawn by Summers (from Isaacs) were soon reissued to expand the first Tregear series to twenty plates.

While the successful transfer of Clay's cartoons was attributable in part to the shared cultural backgrounds and common understandings of London and Philadelphia, the London cartoons took on a new meaning and form. London artists like Isaacs, Summers, Hunt, and Tregear made changes that signposted shifts in the cartoons' meanings, exaggerated the features of Philadelphian blacks even more grotesquely than had Clay, rendering them more bestial in anatomy and features.

Plate	Title	Image	Artist	Publisher	Year	Captions	Notes
No. 1	Dark Conversation		William Summers	G. S. Tregear, London	c.1833	"Bery Black looking day dis Mons'r." "Yes Bery stormy. De Blacks flying about so make it Petickly Disagreable."	
No. 2	An Unfair Reflection		William Summers	G. S. Tregrear, London	c.1833	"It was bery Unfair ob Mifs Carolina to Reflect on de Palenefs ob my Complexion. I consider dat I hab got a bery Good Color."	
No. 3	The New Shoes		William Summers	G. S. Tregear, London	c.1833		
No. 4	The Lub Letter		William Summers	G. S. Tregear, London	c.1833		
No. 5	A Black Charge		William Summers	G. S. Tregear, London	c.1833	"Please y-'r Worship I hab taken up dis Nigger!! case he-'s -nebriated and -sulting to de Fair sec."	
No. 6	The Valentine		William Summers	G. S. Tregear	c.1833	"Holl'a! What's all dis about— 'De rose is Red de Violets blue' 'De Debil's Black and so are You.'; Well dat's bery Fair indeed."	
No. 7	A Black Tea Party		William Summers	G. S. Tregear, London	c.1833		
No. 8	How you find yourself dis hot Weader; Mifs Chloe?		"Engraved by Charles Hunt" (after Edward William Clay)	Harrison Isaacs, London	c.1831		
No. 9	Have you any Flesh coloured Silk; Stockings, young Man?		"Engraved by Charles Hunt" (after Edward Williams Clay)	Harrison Isaacs, London	c.1831		
No. 10	A Black Ball		William Summers	G. S. Tregear, London	c.1833		
No. 11	Grand Celebration ob de Bobalition ob African Slabery		Drawn & engraved by I. Harris (Edward Williams Clay)	G. S. Tregear, London	1833		
No. 12	Romeo and Juliet		William Summers	G. S. Tregear, London	c.1833	ROMEO._"How Silber sweet, sounds Lubbers Tongues by Night; like sorptest Music to attending Ears." JULIET._"Dou know'st de mask ob night is on my face, else would a maiden blush bepaint my cheek."	

=== Additions ===
In 1831, William Summers and Charles Hunt copied ten cartoons from Edward Williams Clay's Life in Philadelphia series for publisher Harrison Isaacs. Tregear's version of Life in Philadelphia initially reprinted two of the cartoons from Isaacs, but soon added eight more, bringing its number of plates to twenty.

At least two alternate cartoons, copied from Clay, were reissued by Tregear under the name "Life in Philadelphia."

Plate	Title	Image	Artist	Publisher	Year	Captions	Notes
No. 13	A Crier Extraordinary		"Engraved by Charles Hunt" (after Charles William Clay)	Harrison Isaacs, London	c.1831		
No. 14	What you tink of my new Poke bonnet, Frederich Augustus?		"Engraved by Charles Hunt" (after Charles William Clay)	Harrison Isaacs, London	c.1831		
No. 15	Hurrah! Hurrah for General Jackson!!		"Engraved by Charles Hunt" (after Charles William Clay)	Harrison Isaacs, London	c.1831		
No. 16	Shall I hab de honour to dance the next quadrille wid you, Mifs Minta?		"Engraved by Charles Hunt" (after Charles William Clay)	Harrison Isaacs, London	c.1831		
No. 17	Is Mifs Dinah at Home?		"Engraved by Charles Hunt" (after Charles William Clay)	Harrison Isaacs, London	c.1831		
No. 18	How you like de new fashion shirt, Mifs; Florinda?		"Engraved by Charles Hunt" (after Charles William Clay)	Harrison Isaacs, London	c.1831		
No. 19	Take away dose rosy lips.		"Engraved by Charles Hunt" (after Charles William Clay)	Harrison Isaacs, London	c.1831		
No. 20	How do you like the waltz, Mr. Lorenzo?		"Engraved by Charles Hunt" (after Charles William Clay)	Harrison Isaacs, London	c.1831		
Alternates
	The Cut Direct: or How to get up in the World		unidentified (after Edward W. Clay)	W. H. Isaacs, London	c.1832		
	Sketches of Character: At Home and Abroad		H. Harrison (after Edward W. Clay)	W. H. Isaccs, London	c.1833		

== Tregear's Black Jokes ==
Tregear's second series was titled Tregear's Black Jokes, being a Series of Laughable Caricatures in the March of Manners amongst the Blacks. It consisted of twenty new cartoons drawn by Summers and engraved by Hunt, and was published in 1834.

The second series was reissued in 1860 by London publisher T. C. Lewis.

Plate	Title	Image	Artist	Publisher	Year	Captions	Notes
No. 1	The Promenade		William Summers	G. S. Tregrear, London	1834		
No. 2	The Lady Patroness of Allblacks		William Summers	G. S. Tregrear, London	1834		
No. 3	Marriage ala Mode		William Summers	G. S. Tregrear, London	1834		
No. 4	The Christening		William Summers	G. S. Tregrear, London	1834		
No. 5	Venus and Adonis		William Summers	G. S. Tregrear, London	1834		
No. 6	The Route		William Summers	G. S. Tregrear, London	1834		
No. 7	The Card Party		William Summers	G. S. Tregrear, London	1834		
No. 8	The Breaking Up		William Summers	G. S. Tregrear, London	1834		
No. 9	Othello		William Summers	G. S. Tregrear, London	1834		
No. 10	The Concert		William Summers	G. S. Tregrear, London	1834		
No. 11	Miss Whites Birthday Party		William Summers	G. S. Tregrear, London	1834		
No. 12	The Lubbers Quarrel		William Summers	G. S. Tregrear, London	1834		
No. 13	Blackberrying		William Summers	G. S. Tregrear, London	1834		
No. 14	Don Juan and Zerline		William Summers	G. S. Tregrear, London	1834		
No. 15	Cinderella and the Black Prince		William Summers	G. S. Tregrear, London	1834		
No. 16	The Portrait		William Summers	G. S. Tregrear, London	1834		
No. 17	The First Lesson		William Summers	G. S. Tregrear, London	1834		
No. 18	The Advertisement		William Summers	G. S. Tregrear, London	1834		
No. 19	The Wedding Feast		William Summers	G. S. Tregrear, London	1834		
No. 20	The Elopement		William Summers	G. S. Tregrear, London	1834		
