= John Kimber =

English sea captain and slave trader

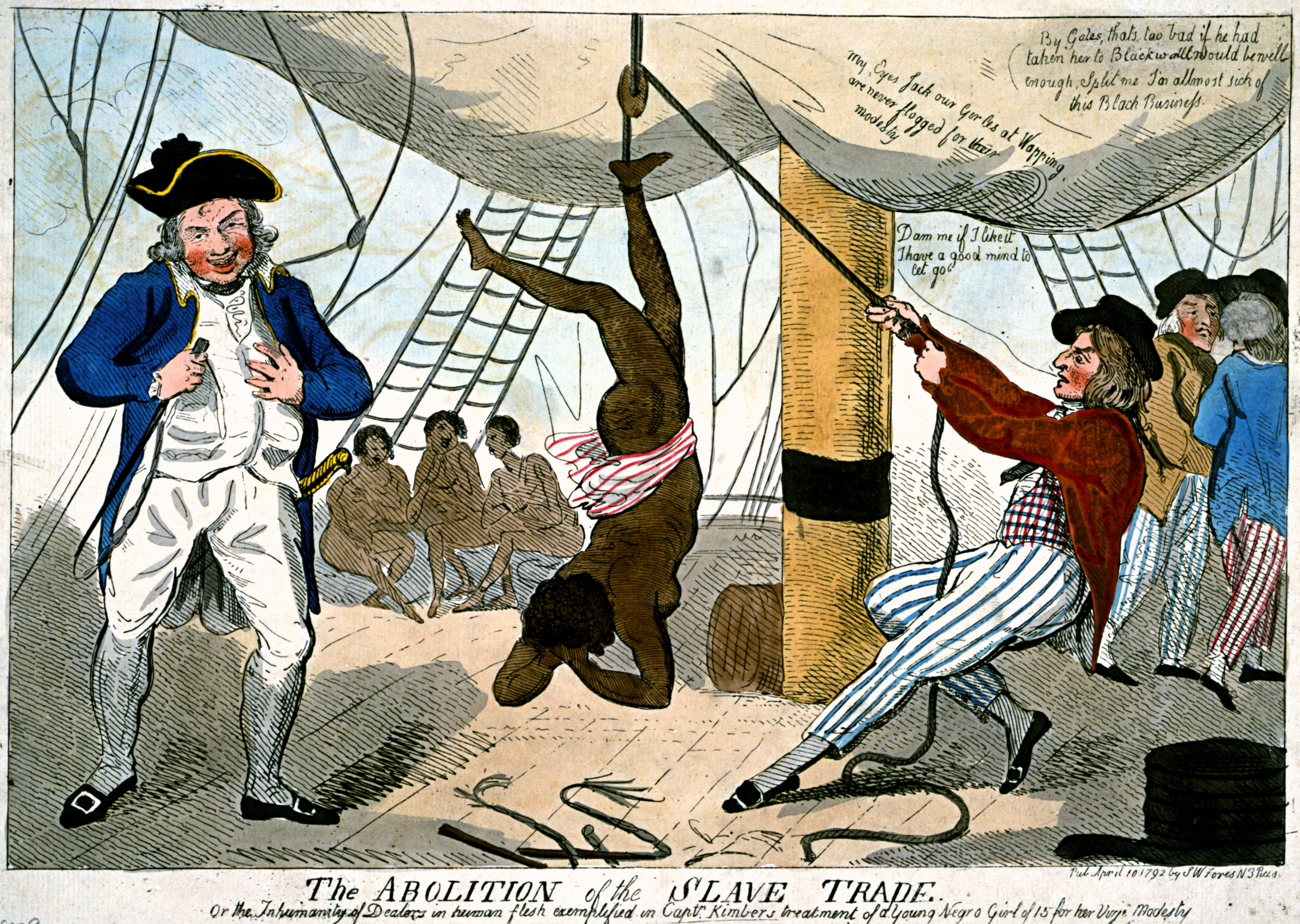
Engraving by Isaac Cruikshank showing Captain John Kimber on the deck of the Recovery, with the girl he was alleged to have whipped to death

John Kimber was an English sea captain and slave trader who was tried for murder in 1792, after the abolitionist William Wilberforce accused him of torturing to death a teenaged female slave on the deck of his ship. Kimber was acquitted, but the trial gained much attention in the press. The case established that slave ships' crew could be tried for murder of slaves. Publicity about the case contributed to growing opposition to the African slave trade, which the British parliament prohibited in its colonies by the Slave Trade Act 1807.

== Killing ==
In 1791, John Kimber was the captain of Recovery, a slave ship of 189 tons (bm) from Bristol, England. The Recovery travelled from Bristol to New Calabar in West Africa, where it collected approximately 300 slaves who were to be sold at Grenada in the Caribbean. The vessel left Africa on 1 September, and arrived at Grenada on 28 October, by which time 27 of the slaves had died.

"Dancing the slaves" was a regular part of the routine of a slave ship on the Middle Passage; the captain and crew forced slaves to exercise to decrease the mortality caused by the extremely cramped and unhygienic conditions below decks. Those who refused to take part in the dancing were flogged with a cat o' nine tails.

On 2 April 1792, William Wilberforce made a speech to parliament at the end of a debate on the abolition of the slave trade. He gave two examples of the atrocities associated with the slave trade, to appeal to the sympathy of fellow members of parliament. First, he described an attack on Calabar by British slave ships, which had bombarded the city to force its traders to lower the price of slaves. The second example was the case of Captain Kimber, who, Wilberforce said, had murdered a teenaged slave girl on his ship for refusing to dance for exercise. Kimber was said to have repeatedly lashed the girl and to have had her several times suspended by one leg and then dropped to the deck of the ship. Following this maltreatment, she had died.

In his speech, Wilberforce emphasised the innocence of the girl. He downplayed the captain's claims (subsequently reported in the press) that she suffered from an unidentified existing medical condition causing lassitude and that she had gonorrhea. Isaac Cruikshank's depiction of Kimber's assault on a "virjen", in his image published at the time, also emphasises her innocence in the face of the captain's aggression and moral corruption.

On 7 April 1792, Kimber placed advertisements in several newspapers proclaiming his innocence. The charges against Kimber were soon reported in the press, as were accounts of his trial beginning in June 1792. Such reports rapidly crossed the Atlantic and were published in ten American newspapers.

== Arrest and trial ==
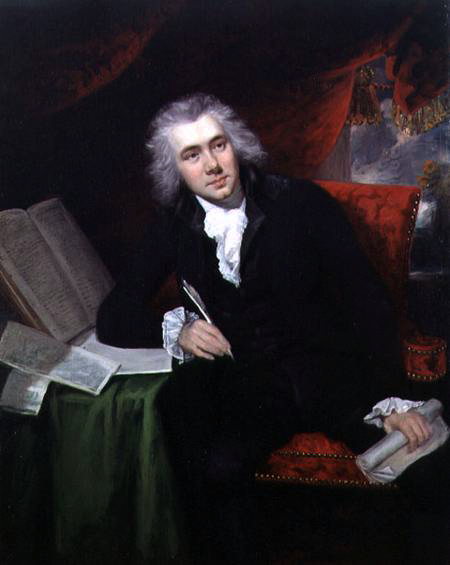
William Wilberforce in 1790, by John Rising

Kimber was arrested in Bristol on 8 April, and taken to London the next day. His trial at the Admiralty Sessions of the Old Bailey began on 7 June 1792, and was attended by many prominent public figures, including Horatio Nelson.

The trial did not reveal much about Kimber's alleged crimes beyond what Wilberforce had said to parliament and was reported in the press. The attention soon turned to the key witnesses testifying against Kimber. Thomas Dowling, the ship's surgeon, was revealed to have a vendetta against Kimber; another witness, Stephen Devereux, was a former mutineer. Three witnesses attested to Kimber's good character, but no witness was called to affirm that Kimber had not ordered a slave girl to be tied up and flogged.

Kimber was acquitted. The trial lasted less than five hours. Future king William IV was present the whole time, and appeared from his looks and gestures, to be particularly interested, in favour of Kimber. In 1793 Dowling and Devereux were tried for perjury, with Dowling being found guilty. Dowling was sentenced to one month in prison and 7 years of transportation, albeit he was later pardoned. Several accounts of the trial were published, which were supportive of Kimber to varying degrees. Kimber pursued Wilberforce for damages after the trial, and continually loitered outside his house. Wilberforce later noted that Kimber's acquittal had been one of the few instances in the abolition campaign that had brought him distress.

== Legal significance ==
In 1781, the crew of the slave ship Zong deliberately killed approximately 132 slaves by throwing them overboard, later claiming the entire ship and its cargo were endangered by lack of water. None of the crew was ever tried for murder, and the subsequent court cases established the legality of their act under specific circumstances of ensuring survival of the ship, crew and remaining slaves. The judge ruled against the insurers' paying for the loss of slaves because of new information revealed at the appeal hearing, which suggested the captain and crew were at fault for the shortage of water.

Historian Srividhya Swaminathan claims that neither the killings nor the 1783 court cases received much attention in the press or in parliament. But nearly 300 Quakers were moved to send a petition to parliament against slavery in July 1783 because of this trial. Walvin notes that by the late 1780s, the Zong case had become an important symbol of the abuses of the slave trade, having inspired anti-slavery writings by Thomas Clarkson, Ottobah Cugoano, James Ramsay and John Newton, and stimulating the rapid growth of the abolitionist movement.

It is significant that, only a decade after the Zong massacre, Kimber as captain of a slave ship was tried for murder in his maltreatment of a slave, and that the case received widespread attention in the newspapers. As the Public Advertiser commented after Kimber's trial, the case had at least established that those who killed slaves could be tried for murder.
