= R. C. Hutchinson =

British novelist

Ray Coryton Hutchinson (23 January 1907 – 3 July 1975) was a best-selling British novelist. His posthumously published novel Rising (1976) was short-listed for the 1976 Booker Prize.

He was born in Finchley, Middlesex and educated at Monkton Combe School, near Bath from 1920 to 1924. He received his BA at Oriel College, Oxford in 1927 and joined the advertising department at Colman's in Norwich. He married Margaret Owen Jones in April 1929.

His first novel, Thou Hast a Devil, was published in 1930. It was followed by The Answering Glory (1932), and The Unforgotten Prisoner (1933), which sold 150,000 copies in the first month. Subsequent novels also sold very well and in 1935 he left Colman's to begin writing full-time.

In March 1940 he joined the army, and in July was posted as captain in the 8th Battalion of the Buffs (Royal East Kent Regiment). He travelled widely during the Second World War, while continuing to write. In October 1945, after preparing the official history of the Paiforce campaign, he was demobilised with the rank of major.

After the war he wrote many more successful novels, often recommended by book clubs. He was elected a Fellow of the Royal Society of Literature in June 1962.

He died before completing the last chapter of his novel, Rising (1976). It was published in September of the same year and short-listed for the Booker Prize in November 1976.

His published work comprises 17 novels and 28 short stories, as well as one play, Last Train South (1938).

== Novels ==
- Thou Hast a Devil (1930)
- The Caravan of Culture (1930, unpublished)
- The Answering Glory (1932)
- The Unforgotten Prisoner (1933)
- One Light Burning (1935)
- Shining Scabbard (1936)
- Testament (1938)
- The Fire and the Wood (1940)
- Interim (1945)
- Elephant and Castle (1949)
- Recollection of a Journey (1952)
  - US title: Journey with Strangers
- The Stepmother (1955)
- March the Ninth (1957)
- Image of My Father (1961)
  - US title: The Inheritor
- A Child Possessed (1964)
  - Winner of the W. H. Smith Literary Award in 1966
- Johanna at Daybreak (1969)
- Origins of Cathleen (1971)
- Rising (1976)

== Drama ==
- The Pace for Living
