= The Rising =

The Rising may refer to:

== Film and television ==
- Mangal Pandey: The Rising, a 2005 Indian film
- "The Rising" (MacGyver), the series premiere of the 2016 television series MacGyver
- The Rising (TV series), a 2022 British TV series
- "The Rising", an episode of the TV series John Doe

== Literature ==
- The Rising (Stirling novel), a 1988 novel, the first of the Flight Engineer series by S. M. Stirling and James Doohan
- The Rising (Keene novel), a 2003 novel by Brian Keene
- The Rising (LaHaye novel), a 2005 novel by Tim LaHaye and Jerry B. Jenkins in the Left Behind series
- The Rising: Murder, Heartbreak, and the Power of Human Resilience in an American Town, a 2015 non-fiction book by Ryan D'Agostino

== Music ==
- The Rising (band), an American band fronted by Michael Johns
- The Rising, a 2000 album by Tigerstyle
- The Rising (album), a 2002 album by Bruce Springsteen
  - "The Rising" (Bruce Springsteen song), the title song from the album
- "The Rising" (Trivium song), a 2006 song by the band Trivium

== Other uses ==
- Easter Rising or Easter Rebellion, the April 1916 republican uprising against British rule in Ireland
- The Rising (9/11 memorial), a 2006 memorial in Westchester County, New York for the victims of the September 11 attacks

== See also ==
- Rising (disambiguation)
