= G.S. Tregear =

English publisher of caricatures and prints

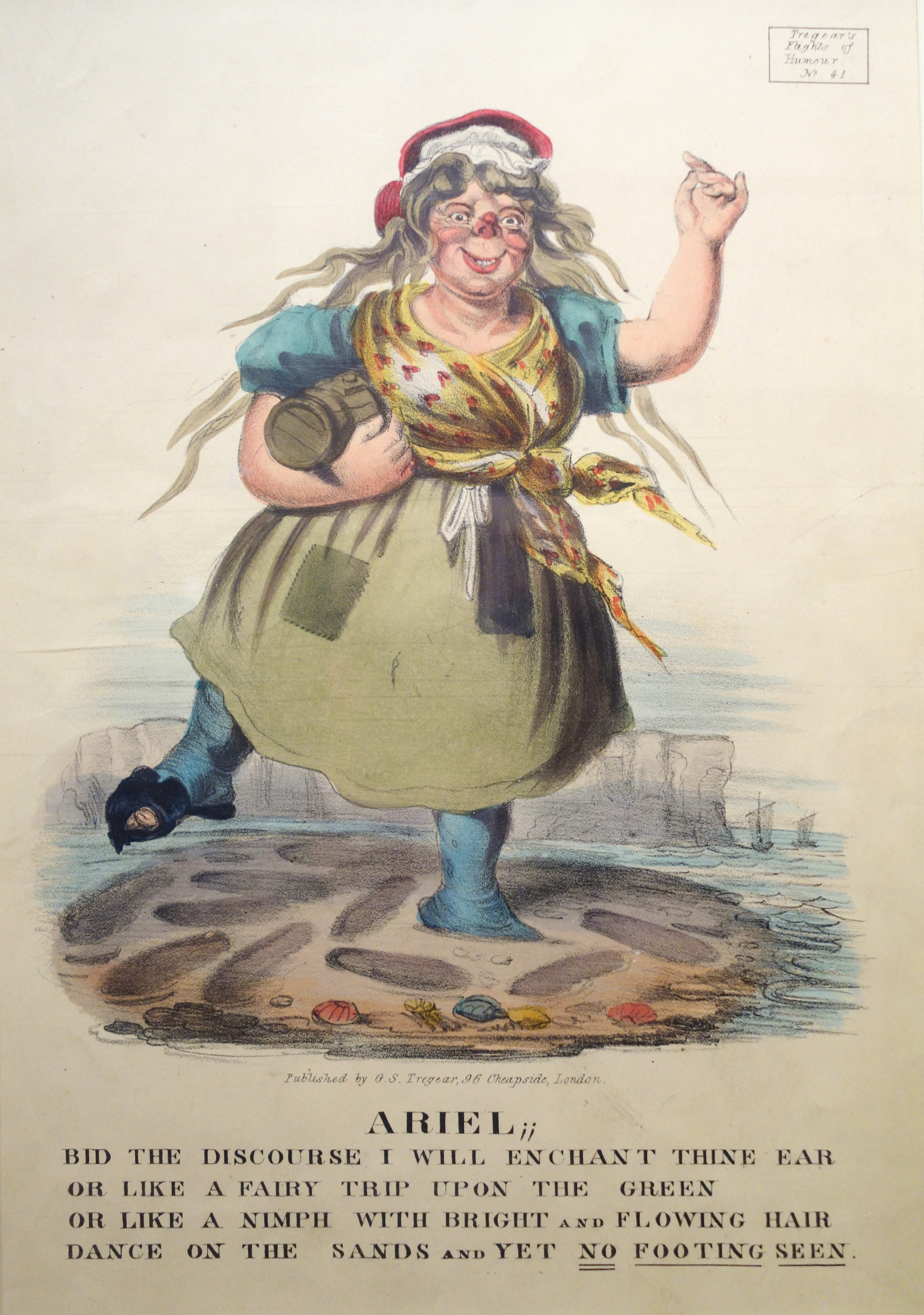
Ariel, from Tregear's Flights of Humour, No. 41

Gabriel Shear Tregear (1802 – 21 February 1841), also known as Gabriel Shire Tregear, was an English publisher of caricatures and prints. Active from the late 1820s until his death, he operated his "Humorous and Sporting Print Shop" from quarters near today's 123 Cheapside, London. Artists and caricaturists published by Tregear included a member of the Cruikshank family of caricaturists, Isaac Robert Cruikshank.

Tregear wed Ann McLean in 1821; she was the sister of Thomas McLean, a publisher and printseller. They had thirteen children; six of them lived to adulthood. In 1823 he published the third edition of Francis B. Spilsburyʼs "Picturesque Scenery in the Holy Land and Syria" (McLean had published the previous edition) from an address in Southwark. By 1826 he had moved to Drury Lane, and published caricatures and other prints from St Peter's Alley, Cornhill. In 1827–1828 he published sporting and theatrical prints from 104 St Martins Lane. From 1828 to 1835 he occupied number 123 on the northwestern corner of Cheapside and Wood Street. This building has since been demolished, but during his day the printshop window was crowded with caricatures. The Times of 7 May 1832 reports:

On Saturday morning, about 11 o'clock, as a boy named William Gunton, son of a watch-spring-maker, No. 3 City-gardens, was standing at the corner of Wood-street, looking at a caricature-shop window, a wagon in passing caught his arm between the stump (put up by the city for protection) and nearly severed it from the body. He was immediately taken to St. Bartholomew's Hospital, and the arm was amputated. There is every possibility of his recovery. The corner of Wood-street is rendered exceedingly dangerous by the exhibition of caricatures, as it invariably induces a crowd to assemble round the shop. On the Saturday previous, a gentleman named Bragge nearly lost his life, within a few yards of the same spot, and numerous robberies are continually occurring.

A policeman was subsequently stationed on the corner and Tregear forced to reduce the number of prints displayed. In 1834 he moved to 96 Cheapside, where he worked until his death in 1841. He died on 21 February 1841, at 18 Goulden Terrace, Islington, of influenza, and was buried at St. Martin in the Fields in Camden Town. His widow continued to operate the business with Thomas Crump Lewis as Tregear & Lewis, also selling musical instruments. The firm went bankrupt in 1844.

Tregear published many series, of which Flights of Humour appears to be the longest, running to 95 prints or more. They are generally undated. The "Rum Jokes" series ran to at least 43 prints, and cover hunting, shooting, and fishing, plus racing events, skating, billiards and the building trade. Tregear's Black Jokes were described in an advertisement as "being a Series of Laughable Caricatures on the March of Manners Amongst the Blacks."

== Tregear's Black Jokes ==
The first series of Tregear's Black Jokes (1833) consisted of 12 lithographed cartoons, drawn by William Summers and engraved by Charles Hunt. The heading "Life in Philadelphia" was used, referring to the 1828–1830 racial cartoon series by American artist Edward Williams Clay. Two of Clay's cartoons were redrawn for Tregear's 1833 series, and a third cartoon by "I. Harris" is now credited to Clay. An additional 8 cartoons by Clay were later added, bringing its number of plates to 20.

The second series of Tregear's Black Jokes (1834) consisted of 20 lithographed cartoons, drawn by William Summers and engraved by Charles Hunt.

== See also ==
- The Print Shop Window article
- Tregear's Black Jokes: Being a Series of Laughable Caricatures in the March of Manners Amongst the Blacks. (1834). from Yale University
