= Rising (novel) =

1976 novel

- First edition
- Author: R. C. Hutchinson
- Genre: Novel
- Publisher: Michael Joseph
- Publication date: 1976
- Publication place: United Kingdom
- Media type: Print
- Pages: 359
- ISBN: 0-71811-523-6
- OCLC: 664325056

Rising is a 1976 novel by R. C. Hutchinson. The novel, posthumously published by Michael Joseph following the author's death the previous year, was shortlisted for the 1976 Booker Prize. Hutchinson was writing the novel's final section when he died, and an outline of the conclusion, based on his notes, was included in a postscript written by his widow.

== Summary ==
Set in a remote region of the Andes, Rising follows Sabino as he leads a peasant militia against rebels who are attacking a railway line that is vital to his family's copper mine. Sabino, who is famed for his brutality, is diverted from his mission by the pursuit of a doctor, Papac, whom he wrongly blames for being spurned by a former lover. Sabino had believed the doctor to be dead, but he apparently yet lives.

== Awards ==
Rising was shortlisted for the 1976 Booker Prize, which was won by David Storey for Saville.
