= Rising River =

Stream in Shasta County, California, US

Rising River is a stream in Shasta County, California, in the United States.

The river comes into sight suddenly at its source, hence the name.

== See also ==
- List of rivers of California
