= John Rising =

English painter

John Rising (1756–1815) was an English portrait and subject painter.

== Life ==
Rising had a large practice in London, and was a regular exhibitor at the Royal Academy from 1785 until his death. Among his subjects were William Wilberforce, Lord Melville, Lord Nelson, Sir William Blackstone, Arthur Young, and Robert Bloomfield. Many of his portraits were engraved. The portrait of Blackstone went to the Bodleian Library, that of the first Marquis of Downshire to Hatfield House, and that of Wilberforce to the Earl of Crawford. Rising is said to have at one time assisted Sir Joshua Reynolds with the backgrounds of his pictures. He died in 1815, aged 59.

Rising also painted fancy and domestic subjects: Juvenile Employment, Ballad Singers, The Sentimental Shepherd, and The Infant Narcissus. Some of them were mezzotinted by William Ward, John Jones, and others.
