= Edward Williams Clay =

American painter (1799–1857)

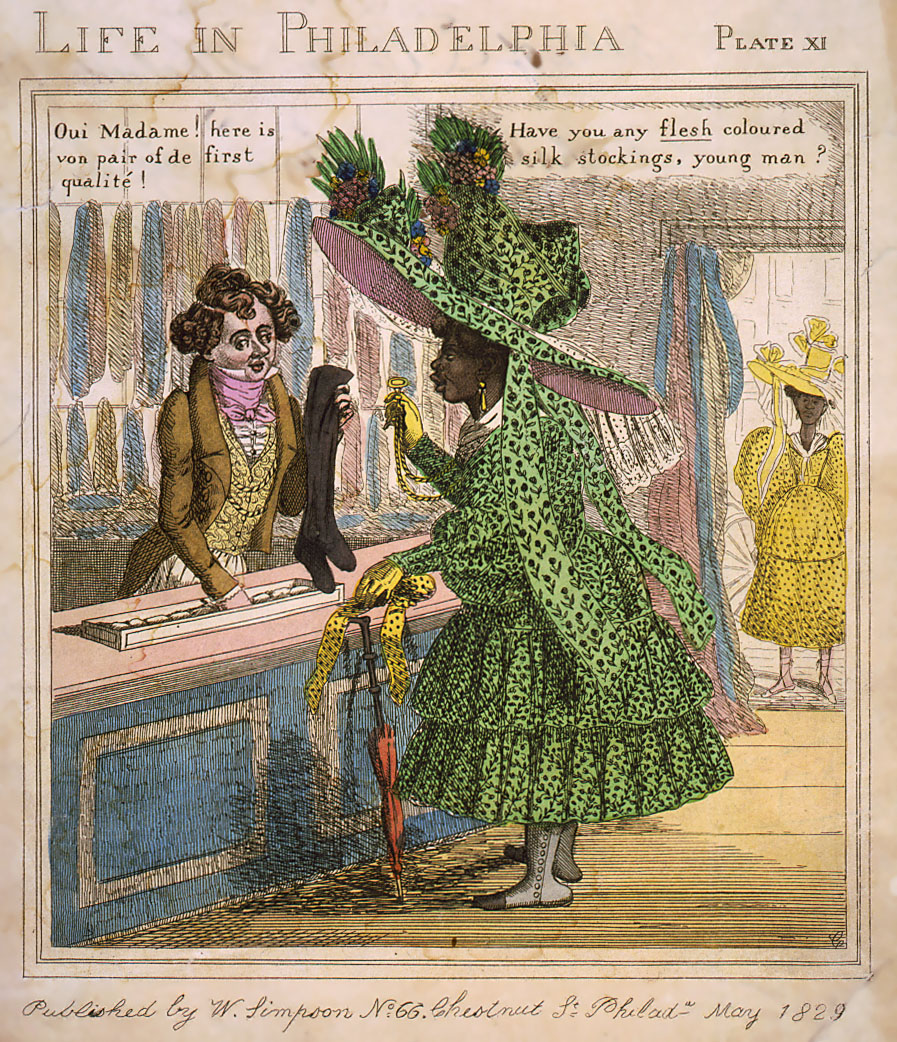
- Life in Philadelphia (1829), plate 11
- Born: April 17, 1799; Philadelphia, Pennsylvania, U.S.
- Died: December 31, 1857 (aged 58); New York City, New York, U.S.
- Resting place: Christ Church Burial Ground
- Known for: Painting; Illustration; Printmaking
- Notable work: Life in Philadelphia

Edward Williams Clay (April 17, 1799 – December 31, 1857) was an American artist, illustrator and political cartoonist. He created the notoriously racist collection of lithographs titled Life in Philadelphia. He was also a notable comic strip pioneer.

== Early life ==
In 1799, Edward Williams Clay was born in Philadelphia, Pennsylvania. His parents were Robert Clay and Eliza Williams. Robert Clay was a sea captain. He attended law school and as of 1825 was a member of the Pennsylvania Bar Association. He started working as an engraver while in law school. He quit his work in law and became a full-time artist.

== Career ==
From around 1825 until 1828 he studied art in Europe. Starting in 1828 until circa 1830 he drew and published Life in Philadelphia, which today, is seen as a "pointedly racist" depiction of early African American life in Philadelphia. Starting in 1831, he focused on political cartoons. That year, he created the work "The Rats Leaving a Falling House," about Andrew Jackson. In 1837, Clay relocated to New York City. He created illustrations and art for books, magazines, and sheet music.

== Death and legacy ==
While still living in New York, his eyesight started to deteriorate, and he stopping working as an artist. He moved to Delaware and served as Clerk of the Court of Chancery. He also worked as Clerk of the Orphan's Court until 1856. He died in New York City in 1857 of tuberculosis. He is buried in Philadelphia at Christ Church Burial Ground.

=== Racial cartoons ===
- Life in Philadelphia (1828-1830)
- "Road to Philadelphy," (ca. 1830-31), The Library Company of Philadelphia, Philadelphia, Pennsylvania
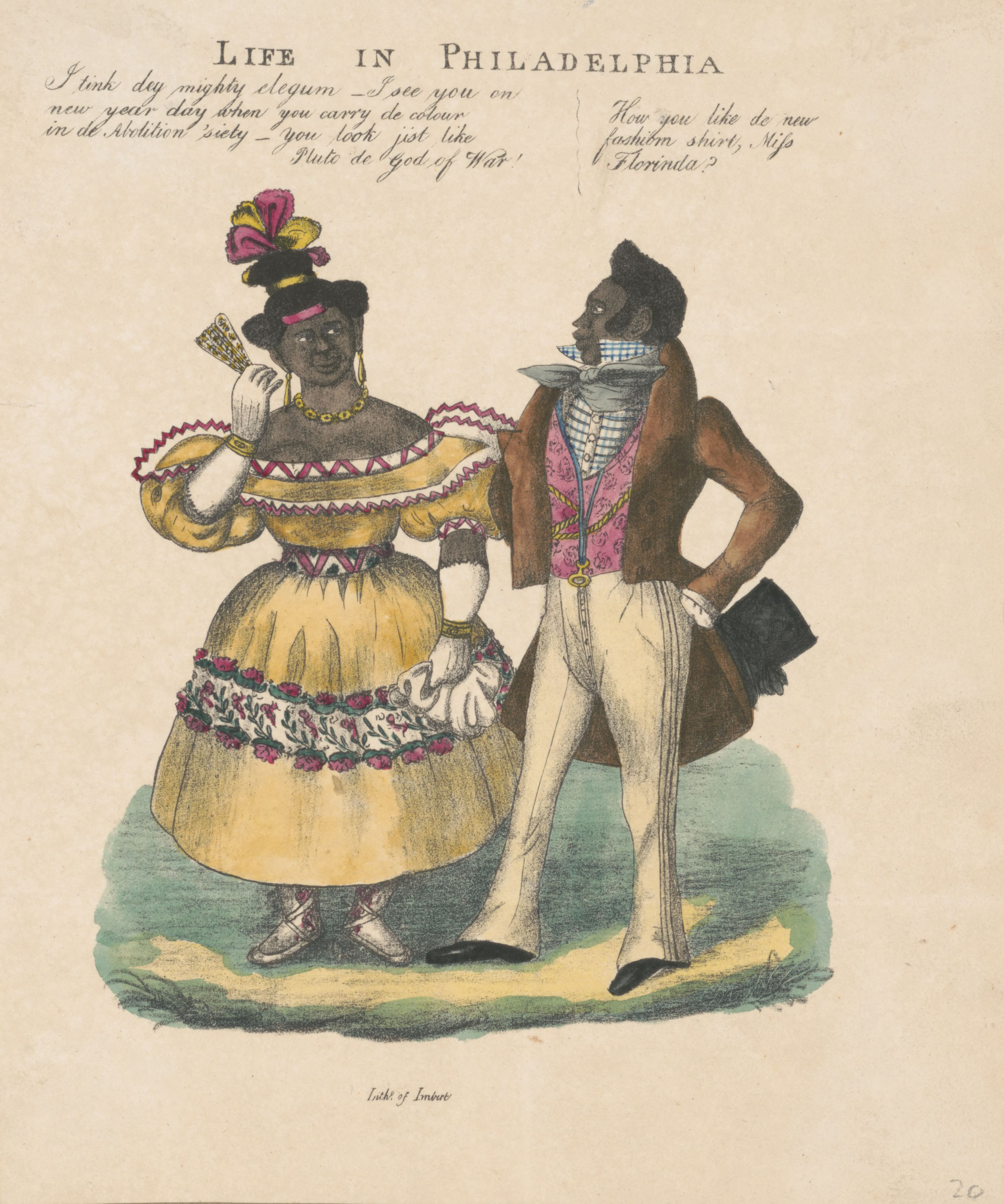
Life in Philadelphia (1829), plate 9

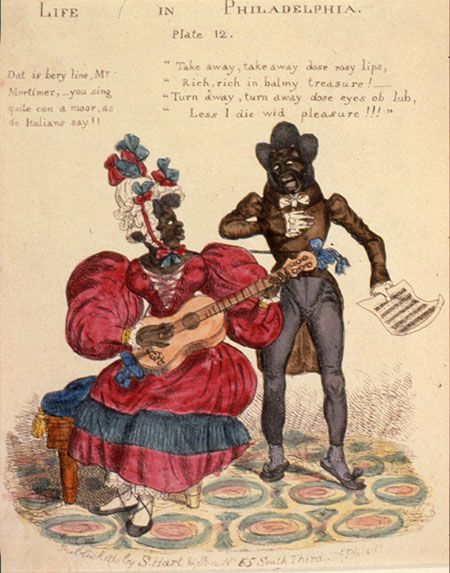
Life in Philadelphia (1829), plate 12

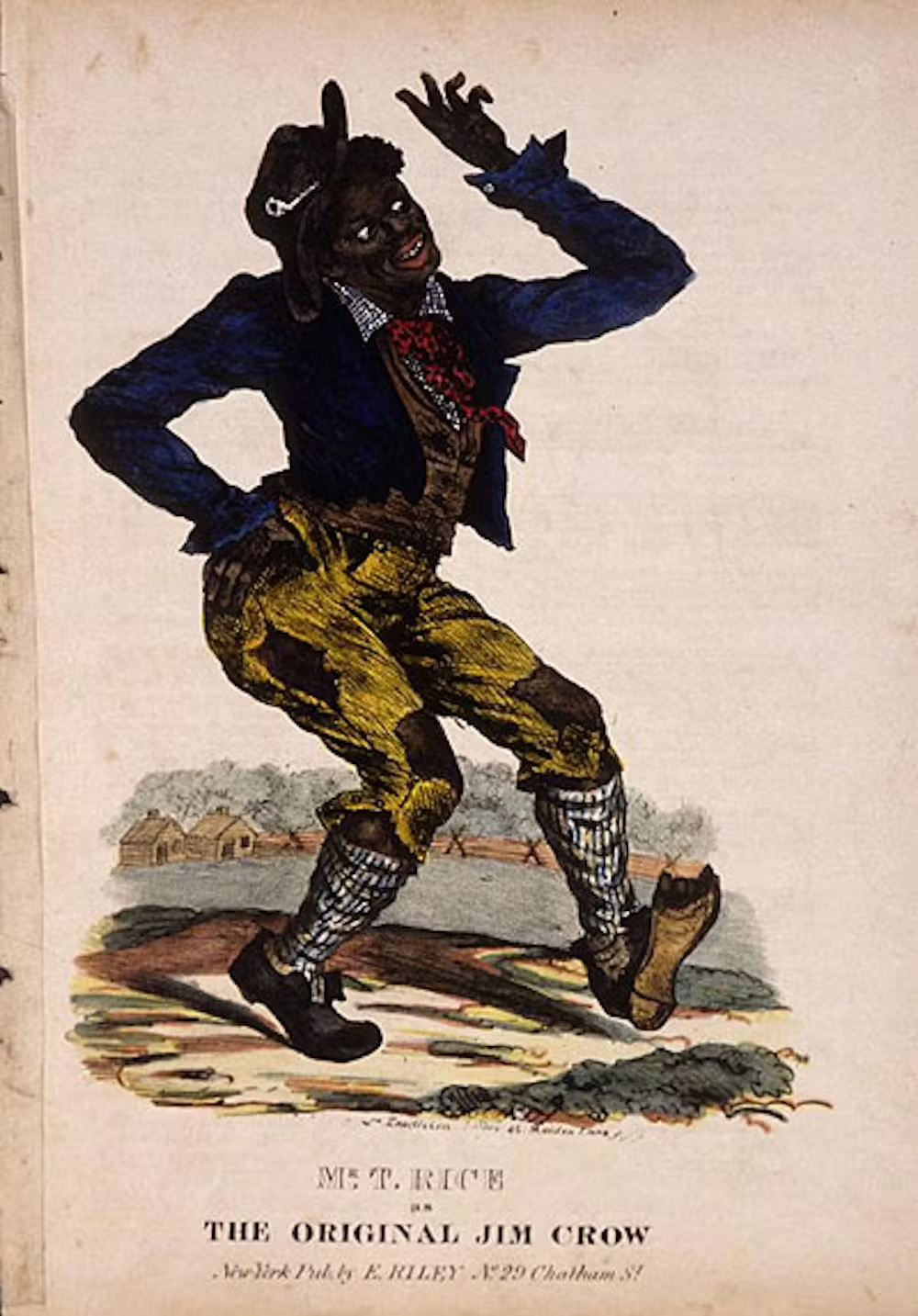
"Mr. T. Rice as the Original Jim Crow" (c.1832)

=== Political cartoons ===
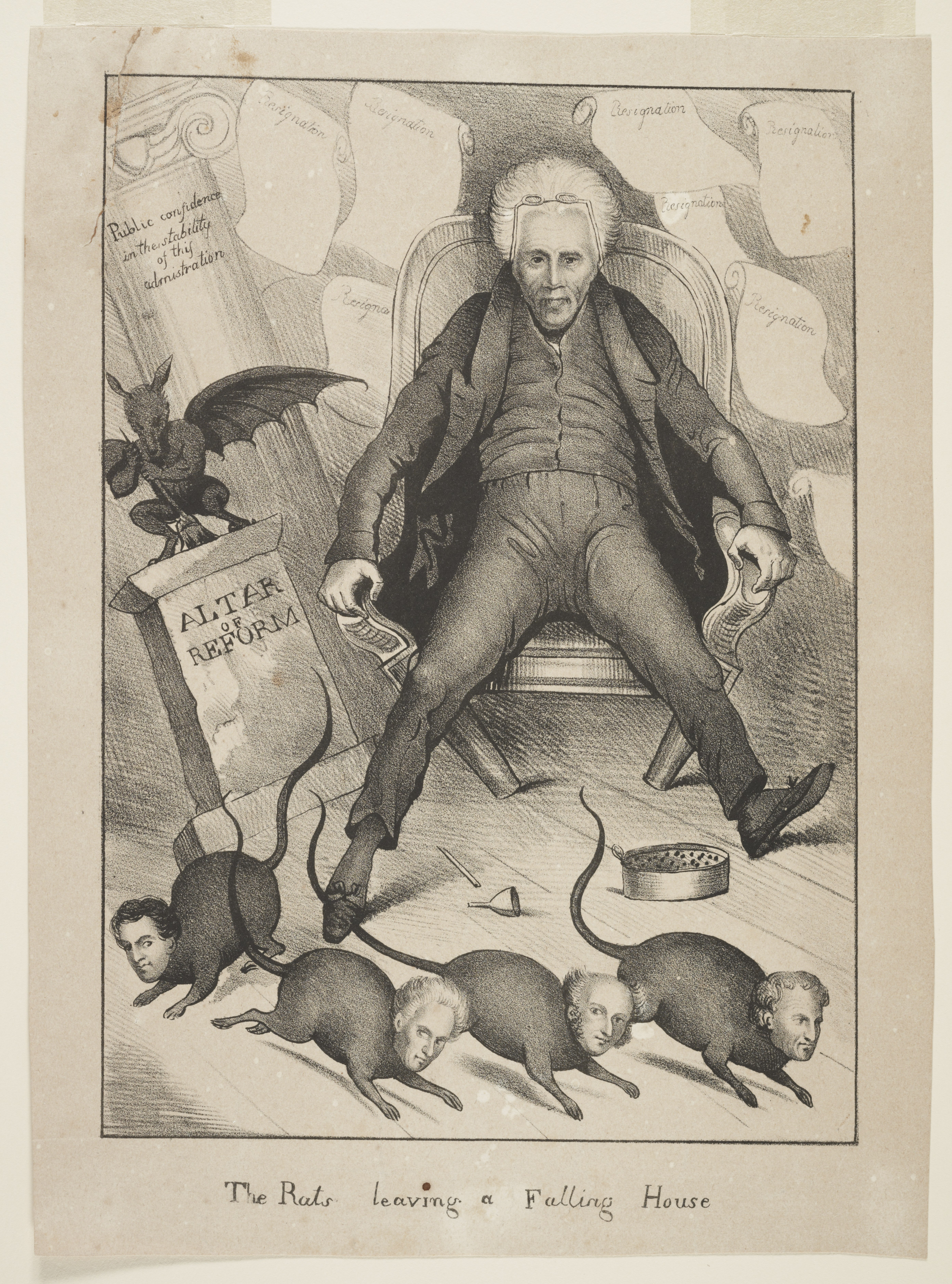
"The Rats Leaving a Falling House" (1831)

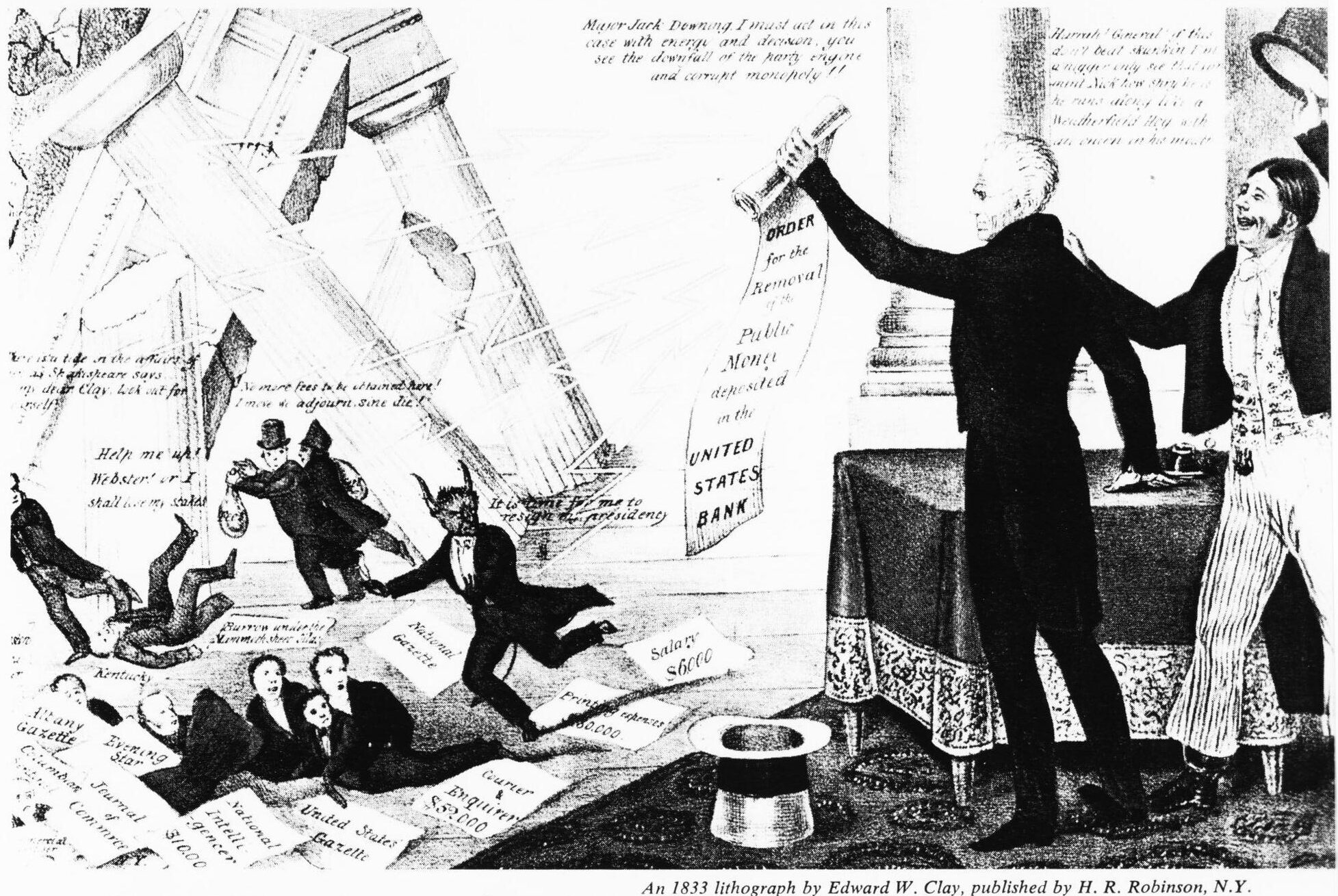
"President Jackson Destroying the Second Bank of the United States" (1833)

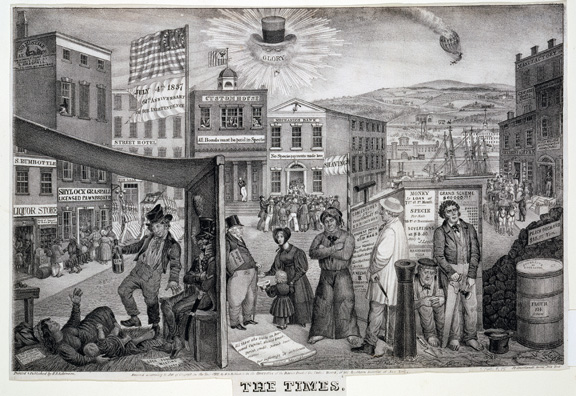
"The Times" (1837)

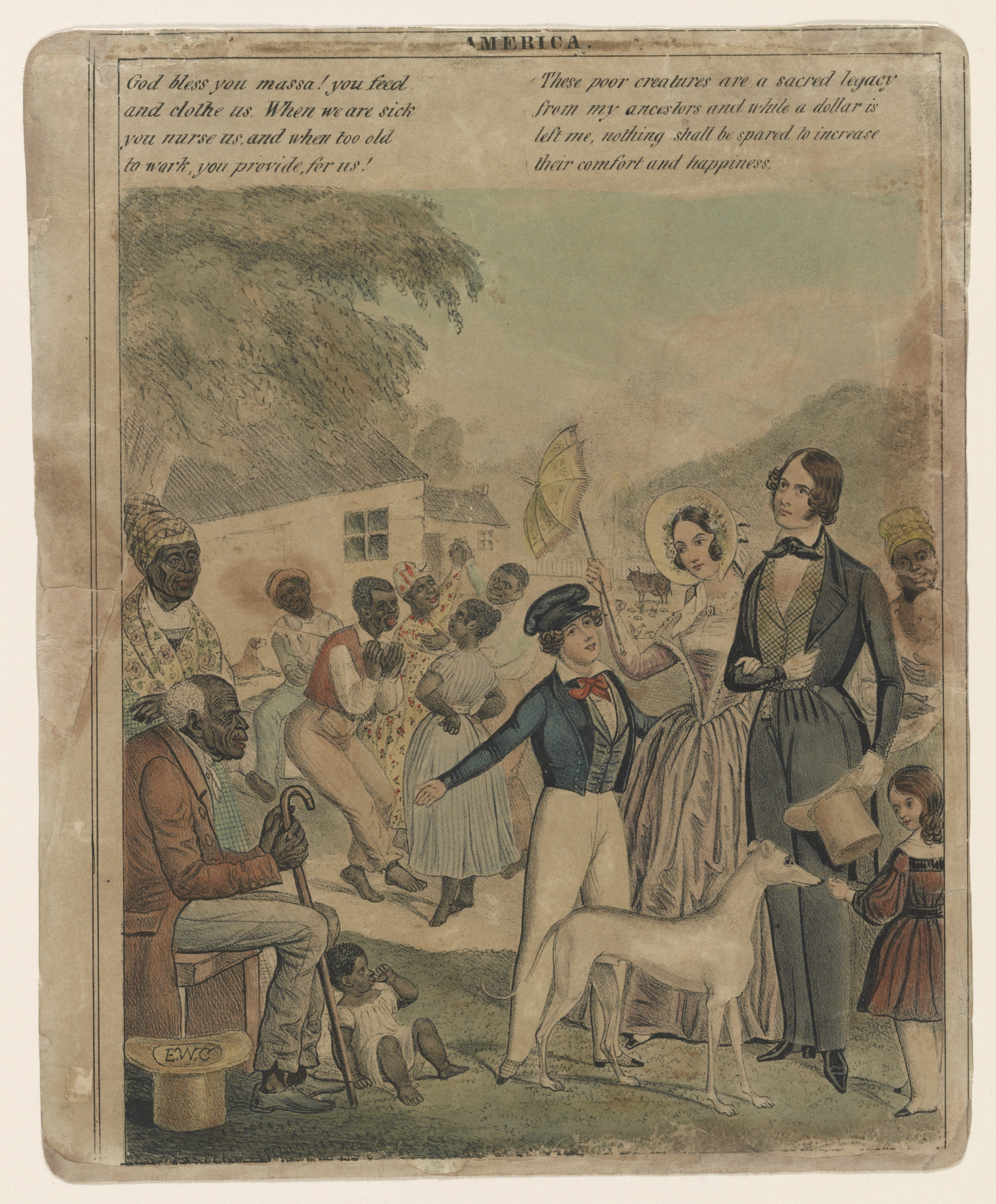
"America" (1841)

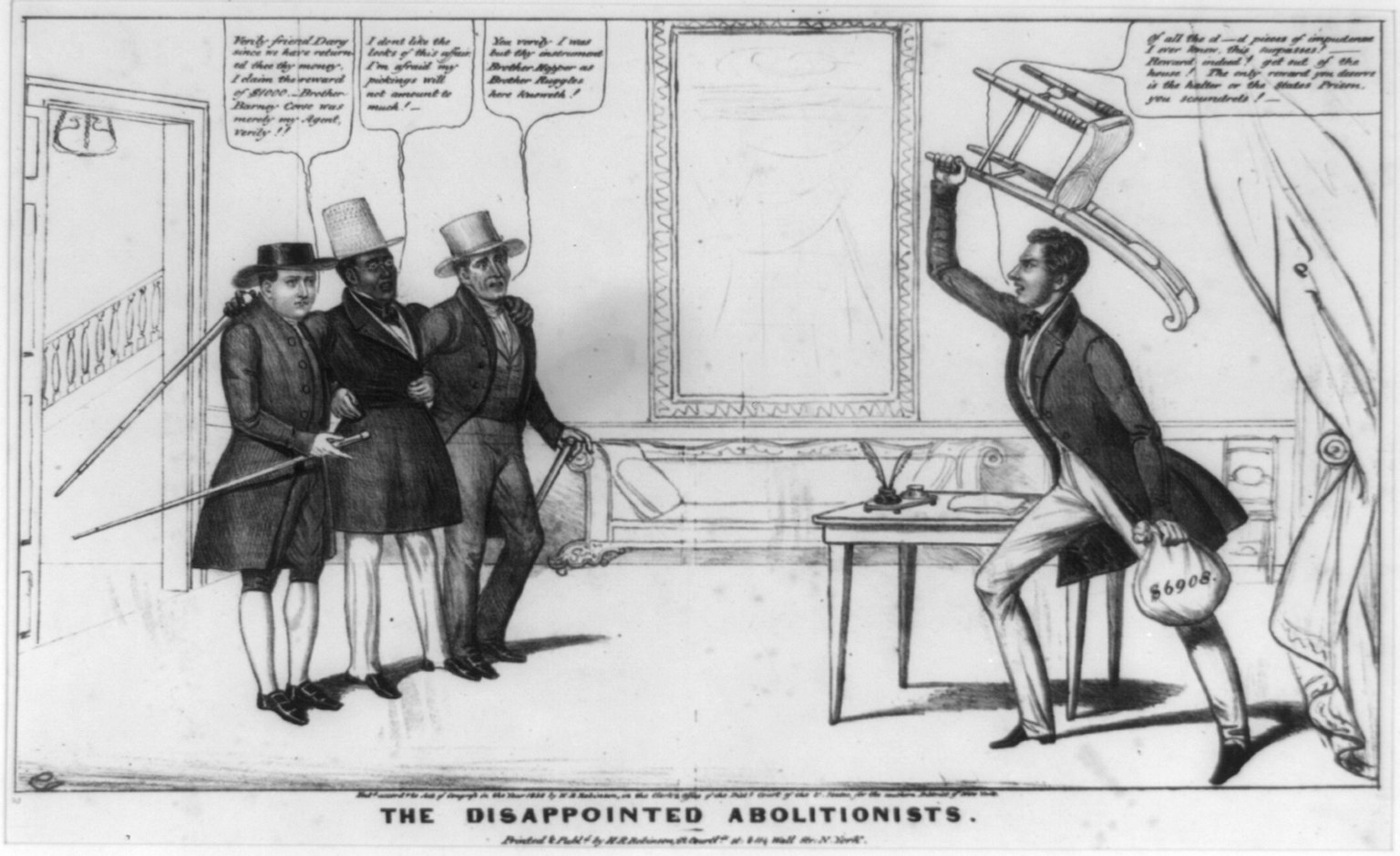
