= Wilson Powell =

Wilson Powell may refer to:

- Wilson Marcy Powell (1903–1974), American physicist
- Wilson Marcy Powell Sr. (1872–1935), Harvard lawyer
