= Corsa (disambiguation) =

Opel Corsa is a supermini car which also marketed as the Chevrolet Corsa or Vauxhall Corsa.

Corsa may also refer to:

- Corsa (moth), a genus of moth
- Chevrolet Corsa, sports variant of the US Chevrolet Corvair automobile
- Toyota Corsa, alternate name of the Japanese Toyota Tercel automobile
- CORSA-b, alternate name of the Hakucho Japanese astronomical satellite
- Corsa Specialised Vehicles

== See also ==
- Corse (disambiguation)
- Corsica (disambiguation)
- Corsican (disambiguation)
