= Isaac T. Hopper House =

Historic house in Manhattan, New York

- U.S. National Register of Historic Places
- New York State Register of Historic Places
- New York City Landmark
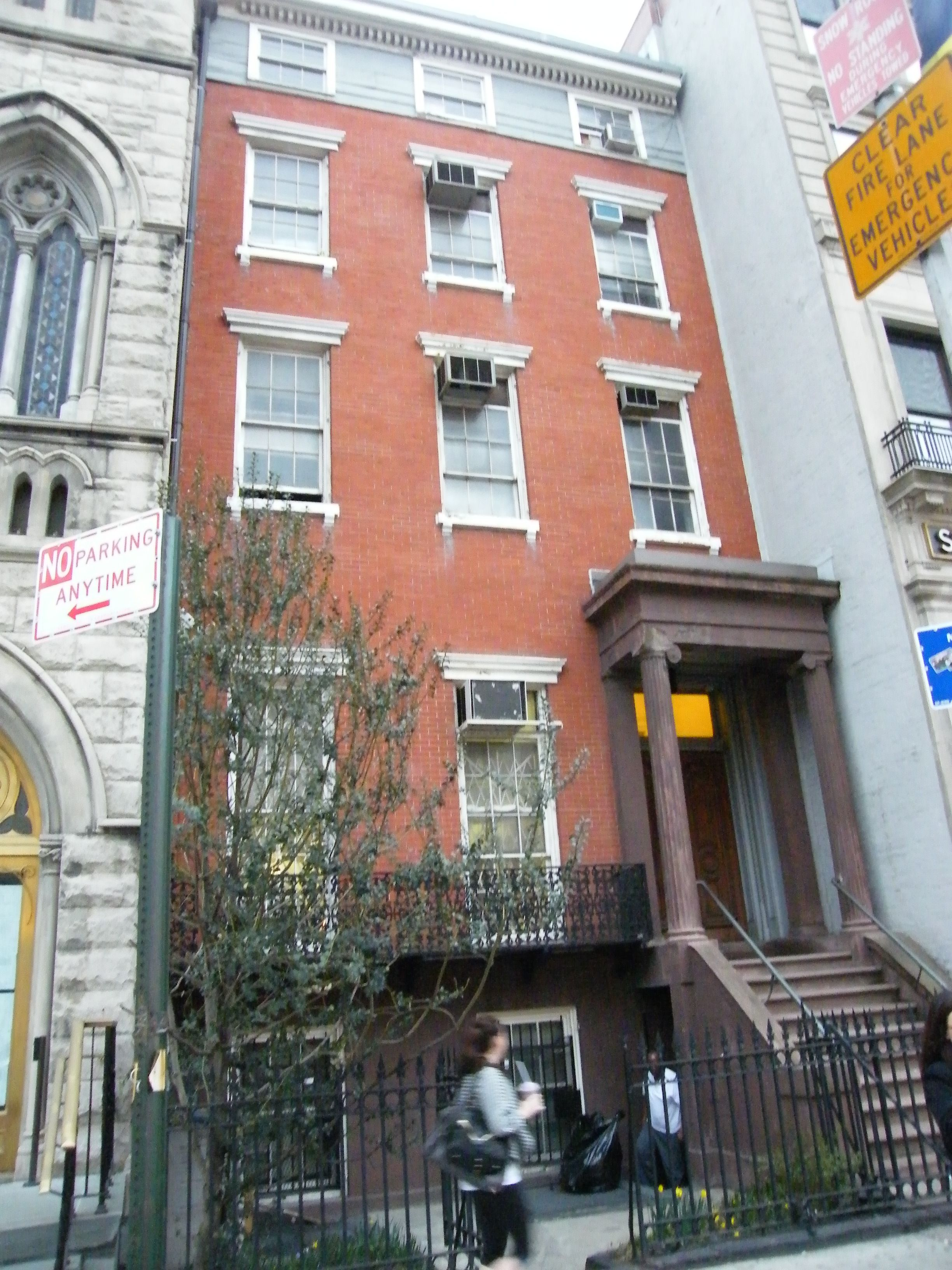
- Isaac T. Hopper House in 2009.

- Location within Lower Manhattan Location within New York City Location within New York Location within the United States
- Location: 110 Second Avenue, Manhattan, New York, US
- Coordinates: 40°43′39″N 73°59′17″W
- Built: 1837-38
- Architectural style: Greek Revival
- NRHP reference No.: 86001155
- NYSRHP No.: 06101.001701
- NYCL No.: 2331

Significant dates
- Added to NRHP: May 22, 1986
- Designated NYSRHP: April 11, 1986
- Designated NYCL: October 13, 2009

The Isaac T. Hopper House is a Greek Revival townhouse at 110 Second Avenue between East 6th and 7th Streets in the East Village neighborhood of Manhattan, New York City. Located just south of the New Middle Collegiate Church, it was built in 1837 and 1838 as a rowhouse. The building was also known as the Ralph and Ann E. Van Wyck Mead House, after its first owner. 110 Second Avenue is the only remaining rowhouse out of a group of four at 106–112 Second Avenue that was used by the Meads' extended family, and was originally known as 108 Second Avenue.

The building was added to the National Register of Historic Places in 1986, and was designated a New York City landmark in 2009. It is also located within the East Village/Lower East Side Historic District, which was created in October 2012.

== History ==
=== Development ===
The area that is today known as the East Village was originally occupied by the Lenape Native Americans before later being settled by the Dutch as part of New Amsterdam. Several large farms were built in the East Village area, including that of New Netherland director-general Peter Stuyvesant. and these wealthy country estates by the middle of the 18th century. After a street grid was laid out in accordance with the Commissioners' Plan of 1811, development of rowhouses came to the East Village by the early 1830s. By the 1830s and 1840s, the East Village was known as one of New York City's wealthiest neighborhoods, though this reputation was relatively short-lived as wealthy families moved to Upper Manhattan.

The lots at 106–112 Second Avenue were originally part of the Nicholas W. Stuyvesant estate before being sold to developer Thomas E. Davis between 1830 and 1835. Davis never developed the lots, instead selling them to Benjamin, Ralph, and Staats (States) M. Mead, three brothers who developed the lots for their own houses in 1837–1838. The Hopper House was originally house #108, while Ralph Mead and his then-wife Sarah Holmes Mead initially lived in the original #110.

=== Use ===
Margaret Robertson bought 108 Second Avenue for $18,500 in 1839, though the house was actually occupied by her son David H. Robertson, a merchant who went bankrupt in 1842. The house was foreclosed upon and was purchased in 1844 for $6,800, at which point ownership was transferred to Ralph Mead. Around this time, 106 Second Avenue was built to the south of the existing rowhouses at 108-112 Second Avenue, and Ralph sold his existing residence at #110 and moved to the next unit south, #108 (the current Hopper House). Ralph Mead lived at #108 with his new wife, Ann Eliza Van Wyck, from 1845 to 1857. The unit was also simultaneously occupied by Ralph's daughter Lydia and her husband Nathan J, Bailey until 1847. The other units in the block also housed other members of the Mead family. Between 1843 and 1858, #112 was the home of Ralph's son's father-in-law, the merchant Francis T. Luqueer, who lived there with his son John. #106 was occupied by Ralph's daughter Harriet Mead, who was married to the son of New York City mayor James Harper.

108 Second Avenue remained owned by the Mead family until 1870. It was leased to the extended family of Montgerald de Girardin, a bookkeeper from Martinique, between 1858 and 1862. By 1866, the house was occupied by a doctor named Herman Milgan. When Ralph died in 1866, his son Melville Emory Mead took over ownership. His sister Elizabeth Alvina Mead, along with Elizabeth's husband Edwin Hyde, were living in the house by 1867. The house was renumbered to #110 in 1870, and was sold to George H. and Cornelia W. Poole Ellery for $20,000. Though the Ellerys primarily lived in Rhode Island, they briefly lived at 110 Second Avenue from 1872 to 1874.

In July 1874, the house was purchased for $32,500 by the Women's Prison Association (WPA), founded in 1845 by Quaker abolitionists and prison reformers Isaac Tatem Hopper and his daughter Abigail Hopper Gibbons. At the time of the move, the WPA had been renamed the Isaac T. Hopper Home and had previously occupied a smaller location at 191 Tenth Avenue. Upon moving to the new location at 110 Second Avenue, the Home set up laundry rooms and household work spaces in the basement, and two sewing rooms on the second floor. The first floor was expanded into the rear yard in 1875 and 1882. Records show that in the year the house was purchased, the WPA served more than 300 women in the building. The house was used primarily by recently released female prisoners.

The surrounding neighborhood went through changes in the early 20th century, as the blocks of Second Avenue around the house became known as the Yiddish Theatre District. Subsequently, the area became a primarily Hispanic neighborhood and a busy arts district in the mid-20th century. Throughout this era, the Isaac T. Hopper House continued to serve the Women's Prison Association as a halfway house. The New York Times wrote in 2009 that the WPA intentionally made the building appear nondescript since it was still in use as a home. At the time, the Isaac T. Hopper House contained space for up to 20 women. The house is one of a few that remain from the East Village's years as an upscale neighborhood.

In December 2020, the Isaac T. Hopper House narrowly avoided burning down from a blaze that engulfed the neighboring Middle Collegiate Church. The occupants of the WPA shelter were evacuated. The building itself sustained some smoke and water damage.

== Description ==
The Isaac T. Hopper House is surrounded by low-rise apartment buildings. The house is 3 1/2 stories tall and measures 25 feet (7.6 m) wide, with three window bays, by 125 feet (38 m) deep. The basement is half a story below ground and contains a brownstone facade, while the three stories above it contain a brick facade. The building is slightly set back from the sidewalk and contains a small front yard behind a metal fence. The front stoop, located half a story above ground level, is in the rightmost bay and leads to a small brownstone portico supported by Ionic columns. The front doorway contains wooden double doors designed in the Italianate style. The windows on the building have metal lintels and sills, which replaced the original stone lintels and sills, and also formerly contained shutters.

There are nineteen rooms in the building, many of which contain fireplaces with marble mantels in the Greek Revival style. The rooms retain their original layout and have not been subdivided, unlike in other rowhouses in the East Village. The first floor serves as a "parlor level" and contains two parlors, one in the front and one facing the back. The rooms are separated by a 10-foot-tall (3.0 m) sliding wooden door flanked by two Ionic columns. Wooden motifs in the Greek Revival style are present within the rooms. A skylight is also located on the third floor.

== See also ==
- National Register of Historic Places listings in Manhattan below 14th Street
- List of New York City Designated Landmarks in Manhattan below 14th Street
