= J Dakota Powell =

American dramatist

J Dakota Powell is a multidisciplinary artist, writer/producer, and the founder of XR Lab and TimeWave, a transatlantic organisation that gathers creative media artists and technologists to explore the use of technology in storytelling and to invent new forms of media and entertainment. She was the Producing Artistic Director of Brave New World on Broadway, which gathered the American theatre to respond to the September 11 terrorist attacks.

== Background ==
Powell has stated that her mother is of mixed Japanese and Chinese ancestry. Through her father, she is the direct descendant of Isaac T. Hopper, a Hicksite Quaker and known as the father of the underground railroad. Her great-grandfather, Wilson Marcy Powell Sr., was a Harvard lawyer who was on the original board of the NAACP, treasurer of the New York State Bar Association, head of Harvard Law School’s endowment and President of New York Hospital. Her paternal grandfather, Wilson Marcy Powell, a Harvard physicist who worked on the Manhattan Project, was a tenured professor of Physics at University of California, Berkeley. Powell graduated cum laude from Yale University with a BA in Economics & Political Science. She completed an MPS at the Interactive Telecommunications Program, New York University.

== Early career ==
Powell won a scholarship with the Joffrey Ballet School in New York City. For four years, she trained as a classical dancer under Meredith Bayliss, Ann Parsons, Richard Gibson and Basil Thompson, and performed at the City Center with the Joffrey Ballet in Petrouchka. She spent six months on scholarship with the Pennsylvania Ballet under the tutelage of Benjamin Harkarvy, Lupe Serrano and Robert Rodham.

== Arts and technology ==
In September 2015, Powell launched the XR Lab (formerly Virtual Reality Lab). The 3-4 month programme provides media creators and technologists with an opportunity to create VR/AR/MR prototypes, brainstorm and explore complex formats using immersive technology, and collaborate with like-minded members of the XR community. XR Lab and the lab's public exhibitions have been hosted by the NYU Game Center and NYU's Interactive Telecommunications Program (ITP), and supported by Time Inc., Hearst Technology, Samsung and Oculus.

Powell's XR portfolio includes: Smashers, Shockwaves, The Red Flute and Ghosts of Camp X. Smashers is a VR experience that tracks the progression of major discoveries in physics as well as the technology used to create the atom bomb. Inspired by the legacy of grandfather Wilson M. Powell, a Harvard physicist who developed the magnets for the Calutrons in the Manhattan Project, Smashers is being developed in the new Oculus Start program 2018-2019. The Red Flute was built for Oculus Launchpad 2017. Shockwaves is a VR game based on the trials and tribulations of US military interrogators in Iraq and was exhibited at the VR Jubilee at the Time-Life Center in 2017.

In July 2015, New York City's first virtual reality hackathon was produced by Powell and a team of ITP/NYU alumni, students and other developers. Hosted by the Interactive Telecommunications Program (ITP) at NYU, VR Hackathon NY partnered with NYVR, NYC Media Lab, Littlstar and Samsung Studio. Sponsors included: EEVO, Fake Love, Freedom 360, Leap Motion, Littlstar, Oculus, Unity 3D and ViSR. The event gathered over 100 creative media artists, designers and developers to implement prototypes of diverse VR formats - experiences, storytelling, applications and games. Hosted by the Samsung Studio in Soho, a mega meet-up launched the event, featuring talks by Ken Perlin, founder of the NYU Media Research Lab, the Littlstar development team and Tom Harding, Director of Immersive Products & Virtual Reality at Samsung.

In June 2013, Powell produced the TimeWave an international festival fusing theatre and technology. Hosted by Innovation Warehouse in Shoreditch, TimeWave gathered 40 actors, 18 writers, 17 directors and multimedia artists, and live-streamed new work (short plays) from London, New York, Los Angeles, Singapore, Madrid and Montreal. Supporters included Walt Disney Imagineering, Hathersage Capital Management, Arts Council England, Telestream and Vidyo. The festival featured new writing from Neil LaBute, Alexandra Gersten-Vassilaros, Kara Manning, Paul Charlton, Jonathan Lewis, Nick Cheesman, Sheri Graubert, Zainabu Jallo (Nigeria), Maksym Kurochkin (Russia) / John Freedman (translator), Lachlan Philpott (Australia), Gary Duggan (Ireland) and Wesley Leon Aroozoo (Singapore). The hallmark of the event was the exploration of telepresence in which actors in remote locations were streamed on to a London stage. Virtual actors and British actors performed in the same play; time and distance dissolved in live performance.

In March 2011, Powell launched LoNyLa, a transatlantic venture that leverages digital technology to link artists in London, New York and Los Angeles. The organization uses an online video streaming platform to broadcast material to remote audiences and Skype to enable artists in different locations to interact in real time. Fueled by graduates of Yale College and the Yale School of Drama, LoNyLa has grown to include a few hundred actors, writers and directors.

== Contribution to theatre ==
Powell has written several plays, including Bliss Moon, The Impostor, Savage Light, Overkill, Shockwaves, Blackwater and Harry Black. Harry Black was produced in the Ensemble Studio Theatre’s New Work Series, and featured Jude Ciccolella as “Harry Black.” Blackwater was selected for the National Playwrights Conference, the Eugene O’Neill Theatre Center as well as by playwright John Guare for the Lincoln Center Reading Series. Nominated for the Susan Smith Blackburn Prize, The Imposter was produced by Alice’s Fourth Floor (NYC), and starred Calista Flockhart, Austin Pendleton and Clark Gregg. She has been produced by the Bay Area Playwrights Festival, the Philadelphia Theater Company’s New Works Series, Circle Repertory Theatre, the Ensemble Studio Theatre and Duke University’s New Works Series. She has been commissioned by South Coast Repertory Theatre, Talking Wall Pictures and PBS Great Performances. Her original screenplay, Triggers, won a Writers Guild of America, East screenwriting fellowship.

Powell launched Brave New World on Broadway (2002) on the first anniversary of the 911. The historic three-day event galvanized the American theatre to respond to the terror attacks, bringing together dozens of major playwrights, actors and directors. As reported by the BBC News: "Initially started as a modest festival by founder and playwright J Dakota Powell, the project blossomed into a series with over 50 original works and the participation of over 150 artists.” Among the artists who participated in the festival were Marisa Tomei, Ethan Hawke, Olympia Dukakis, Isabella Rossellini, Alec Baldwin, John Turturro, Amy Irving, Elias Koteas, Ann Reinking, Eli Wallach, Fisher Stevens, Cynthia Nixon, Kristin Davis, Paul Rudd, Neil Patrick Harris, Jason Patric, Amanda Peet, Sam Waterston, Holly Hunter, Scott Cohen and Joel Grey.
