= James Poovey =

- Born: c. 1769; Philadelphia, Province of Pennsylvania, British America
- Died: Unknown
- Occupation: Blacksmith's assistant
- Known for: Freeing himself through non-violent disobedience

James Poovey (c.1769–unknown) was an 18th-century Philadelphian described by abolitionist Isaac Hopper in Tales of Oppression. According to Hopper, Poovey was enslaved from birth and sought manumission through non-violent disobedience, simply refusing to work. Although the accuracy of Tales of Oppression is debated by historians, some narratives have been verified through court records and other corroborating evidence held by the Historical Society of Pennsylvania. Hopper's written account of James Poovey's life was later edited and embellished by his colleague, abolitionist author Lydia Maria Child, who supplemented the narrative with her own recollections of how Hopper told the story.

== Legal status and education ==
In 1780, the Pennsylvania legislature ratified "An Act for the Gradual Abolition of Slavery", which effectively abolished the importation of future slaves to Pennsylvania, and granted children born into slavery after its enactment freedom at age 28. James Poovey, born roughly 11 years before the institution of this law, was excluded from claiming freedom under the act. According to Child, the fact that other men a few years younger than Poovey were eligible for their freedom, while he remained in bondage, was a "source of uneasiness" for him.

Poovey was owned by Coates, a blacksmith in the Southwark District of Philadelphia, and had learned the trade, making him "very valuable". During winter evenings, Poovey attended the Young Men's Society for the Free Instruction of Colored People, where he first became acquainted with Isaac Hopper, a Quaker and member of the Acting Committee of the Pennsylvania Abolition Society, who taught him to read.

== Manumission ==
=== Failed negotiations ===
In 1802, around 33, Poovey attempted to negotiate his freedom from the blacksmith. In Hopper's account, Poovey argued that his continued submission to slavery was "a great sin", and invoked the Golden Rule of Christianity (Matthew 7:12), saying, "we must do as we are done by". Initially, Poovey offered Coates seven years' faithful service in exchange for his freedom, but Coates refused. He then offered to purchase his freedom from Coates by earning wages at sea. Coates also rejected this. Poovey announced that he would never make another offer, reported that he refused to work, and walked off.

=== Jail time ===
Coates responded immediately by applying to the magistrate for an arrest warrant. Poovey was arrested and imprisoned "as a disobedient, refractory slave". Almost a month later, Coates visited Poovey in jail to ask him to recant and return to work. Poovey repeated his refusal to work for Coates again, saying he understood that he might live the rest of his life in jail.

=== Escalation to prison board ===
After the confrontation, Coates applied for the inspectors to hold Poovey in the cells until he was finally willing to "submit". Coates was referred to Hopper, who was on the prison board and refused to make Poovey return to bondage or punish him further. According to Child, after Poovey's first jail term had expired, Coates arranged to have him incarcerated for another 30 days and also tried to bribe him with a new suit and "Methodist hat", but Poovey flatly refused to ever work for him again. Coates could not sell Poovey out of state, and it was unlikely he could sell him in Philadelphia, so he finally gave up. Following the completion of his second jail sentence, Poovey was discharged without further interference, and became de facto, if not legally, a free man.

== See also ==
- History of slavery in Pennsylvania
- Timeline of abolition of slavery and serfdom
- Isaac Hopper
- Henry Box Brown
- List of slaves
