= Ladies' New York City Anti-Slavery Society =

American abolitionist organization

The Ladies' New York City Anti-Slavery Society was a group of white Christian women in New York City who created an abolitionist society based on their religious views. At this time moral reforms were becoming popular and were encouraged by preachers. This group was founded in 1835 and had about 200 members. They felt as though they could help end slavery by using religion to pray and spread anti-slavery ideas, but this limited their activities, because they believed in the idea of separate spheres they did not participate in anything that was in the public sphere alongside men. Their society wrote letters, circulated petitions and held parlor lectures and conventions. There was a lot of controversy around this group within the women's anti-slavery movement because they did not allow black members. They also often fought against the women's rights movement. These views on women's rights eventually led to the end of the society because it was agreed that women should not be allowed to participate in organizations and voice their opinions alongside men. This led the New York City Anti-Slavery Society, which was male only, and the Ladies New York City Anti-Slavery Society to walk out of a planned debate that was held by the American Anti-Slavery Society. After this, the women's society supposedly served as an auxiliary of a new society the men created called the American and Foreign Anti-Slavery Society. They did not have any recorded activity after this debate.

== Background ==
At this time anti-slavery societies had started to become more organized across the United States, especially in cities. In the early to mid 19th century, New York City had a large evangelical revivalist population and religion was the center of many people's lives. At this time, new practices that allowed women to become more involved in church services; for instance, women could pray aloud and repent alongside men. This small break from separate spheres pushed women to participate in popular moral reforms. Many upper-class families paid others to do the housework that was usually allocated to women, giving elite women more freedom beyond the home. A preacher named Charles Grandison Finney preached in Evangelical Presbyterian churches and helped gain momentous support for multiple moral reforms including the anti-slavery movement. In his sermons he advised that people should find a meaningful place within society convincing many women to join and support moral reform societies and movements. In New York City, this influenced women to join groups such as the New York Female Moral Reform Society and the New York Female Benevolent Society, and encouraged them to start new abolitionist societies, including the Female Anti-Slavery Society of Chapel Street Church and the Ladies of New York City Anti-Slavery Society. The majority of women who joined these moral reform societies had strong religious beliefs and most were related to merchants and evangelical clergymen who provided their economic sustenance. There were multiple different sects of Christianity involved in these new societies including Presbyterians, Methodists, Baptists, and Quakers.

== Founding ==
The Ladies New York City Anti-Slavery Society was founded in 1835. The society had about 200 Christian white women as members. Their goal was to use their religion to help the anti-slavery movement. Their society would be an auxiliary to the American Anti-Slavery Society and all ladies who supported them and paid the funds necessary would be a member and could participate and vote in the meetings. They planned to structure the group by having one woman from each Protestant Congregational Church in New York City sit on the board of managers. By doing this they hoped to have a wider influence and increase their membership. Though the majority of officers were members of the Presbyterian church, the group claimed to be non-denominational. The first director of the society was Mrs. Reverend Martyn; she was married to a Presbyterian minister who was also involved in the anti-slavery movement. She led the New York Female Moral Reform Society and later the Women's Prison Association. The majority of other women who joined also had husbands who were active in the evangelical church and in abolition movements; some had joined the anti-slavery movement before their husbands. They had an annual report each year that included what they had completed and what funds had been collected and used, along with any documents related to that year's activities including letters sent and received.

== The society's views ==
=== Slavery ===
This female anti-slavery society was a very religious group, they founded the group on Christianity and the anti-slavery scripture in the Bible. They planned to use Christianity to get people to join them and to spread abolitionist ideals. This group was founded based on the ideals of the Second Great Awakening and the sermons of Charles Grandison Finney. These women wanted to use their religion and evangelical views to run their society. They felt that slavery was a “moral and domestic evil” and Finney helped to push them towards supporting emancipation and abolition. They hoped that using Christian beliefs would gain support for the abolition of slavery and spread God's wishes. They believed that religious reform would be more effective than institutional reform. In their constitution it shows that they believed slavery was a violation of the laws of God and that emancipation and abolition were the only options to make up for these sins. They hoped “to promote the religious, moral, and intellectual improvement of the colored population” and they planned to use the Bible and God's wishes to show that one cannot be truly Christian while supporting slavery. In their first annual report, they mentioned how God was watching the treatment other people and how enslaved people were God's children. Good Christians should not enslave people since everyone was the same in God's eyes and all humans felt the same pain and emotions. They hoped to stop the church from participating in sermons that supported and spread slavery, and they promoted ideas about purifying the church from the sin of slavery. They did not believe slave owners could be true Christians and thought they should not be part of the church until they can admit that slavery is oppression and a sin in the eyes of God.

=== Women's rights ===
This group was seen as very controversial at the time, there were many influential people and groups that did not align with this society's views on women's rights. Their religion mirrored the society's views in other ways, including how they viewed women's rights. Because of their religious views, they upheld the idea of separate spheres and believed that women should not be in the public sphere. To them slavery was the woman's place to work and needed their attention above any other issue. They were ashamed that they didn't join the anti-slavery reform earlier and wanted to fight for abolition so they could lookback and know they did something to help. To them, this was part of a woman's proper sphere because of their womanly sympathy; but they would not participate in the political side of this issue because it was seen as something that would make women less feminine and it would force them to leave their proper sphere. They instead asked women to pray for enslaved peoples freedom, which allowed them to use their religion and womanly sympathy to help without leaving their proper sphere. Another suggestion was to raise their children to support the anti-slavery movement. As mothers it was their duty to instill American values in their children, and pass along abolitionist views while raising them. They focused on Republican Motherhood and Christian charity, and though they opposed the women's rights movement, they supported abolition.

== Abolition activities ==
As a society, they completed a plethora of different abolitionist activities, including writing letters, holding conventions, and circulating petitions. One of the first things they completed after founding was writing a letter to George Thompson because he inspired them to create the organization. George Thompson was a famous abolitionist who faced a lot of backlash for the progress he made in the anti-slavery movement. In the letter they wrote about how embarrassed they were that he was receiving such treatment, and let him know that they appreciated him and his work. However, in the First Annual reviews it explains that though the letter was sent, he never did write back. The Boston Female Anti-Slavery Society also sent a letter to the Ladies New York City Anti-Slavery Society accepting them as friends and hoping to join forces with other female anti-slave societies in New England. The groups would have more influence together to raise funds for the American Anti-Slave Society and could convince more southern women to support the movement. They collected funds for their society and the American Anti-Slavery Society. The funds allocated for the society also supported the Ladies Anti-Slavery Sewing Society, which was a smaller group under their original organization. This auxiliary sewed the society's slogan onto different items to gain support and bring attention to their group. They sold their sewed items to gain funds for the society. This included needlework and book covers with the slogan, “May the use of our needles prick the conscience of slaveholders.” Along with this they distributed Anti-slavery pamphlets and other publications. They sent and circulated petitions to Congress, pushing for abolition in the District of Columbia, and the group created and spread the Ladies petition to the general assembly that they had in 1836. They also gave petitions to the Presbyterian church general assembly and they circulated Anti-Slavery Tracts. In 1836, the society held lectures to gain support for their cause and had the Grimké Sisters speak in their event, which they hoped would create a bigger audience for their society. This was originally a series of parlor lectures, but there were too many people interested and they needed to find a bigger space. The event moved to the succession room of Reverend Duncan Dunbar's Beriah Baptist Church. They wanted this meeting to just include women so they would escort men out when they entered. While they were in operation, they also hosted a national convention that lasted four days in 1937. They sent 18 delegates and 80 members. They did not lead the convention, they hosted it, but they were one of the more conservative groups that participated.

== Controversy ==
=== Racism ===
The organization was controversial within abolitionist circles for its lack of racial integration. Unlike many other women's antislavery societies in the country, it did not allow black members. Some women directly challenged the racism of this club. Abigail Hopper Gibbons (1801–1893), for instance, refused to support the Ladies' New York City Anti-Slavery Society; she joined the Manhattan Anti-Slavery Society because they had mostly black members. Even more public criticism came from Sarah Grimké and Angelina Grimké, who were disturbed by the exclusion of black members from the society during the lectures they gave for the organization. The Ladies New York City Anti-Slavery Society felt as though the parlor talks went very well and they praised the Grimké sisters were so disgusted by their prejudices and the racism within the group that they made sure people of color were represented at the convention later hosted by the Ladies New York City Anti-Slavery Society.

=== Women's rights ===
At this convention, the women who were part of this society would not support any resolutions presented that were for women's rights or extending a women's sphere as many of the other societies did. When Angelina Grimké offered a resolution about extending women's spheres almost all of the ladies from the Ladies New York City Anti-Slavery Society voted against it. A second resolution was unanimously approved because it presented the anti-slavery movement coinciding with traditional womanhood and it was based on the idea of motherhood, which all women could relate to. The third notable resolution allowed women to sign their names on the convention list without the title of Miss or Mrs.. every women chose not to sign with a title except for a small number of women in the Ladies New York City Anti-Slavery Society who chose to use their title. This was a feminist ideal that women in this society fought because they believed in their separate spheres. This was not acceptable to other women in anti-slavery societies because women's rights coincided with the abolition movement, especially in women centered societies.

== End of society ==
The organization lasted for five years. Their last known activity was at a debate within the American Anti Slavery Society from 1839 to 1840. The debate was about whether women should be allowed to participate on equal terms with men in anti-slavery activism. Lewis Tappan and others felt that women were useful to the movement but only subordinately in their proper sphere. They opposed women speaking out at meetings when men were present, and they believed women should not be officers or head committees within the organization. This group of men were part of the male only New York Anti-Slavery Society, but not everyone agreed with them. When their ideas were rejected, they walked out and soon formed the American and Foreign Anti-Slavery Society. The members of the Ladies New York City Anti-Slavery Society shared their values and walked out when many of their male family members did. The ladies' group said they became an auxiliary of the American and Foreign Anti-Slavery Society but there are no records of any activity after this debate, and many of the members' names were recorded on membership lists of other reform societies.
