= David Ruggles =

American abolitionist (1810–1849)

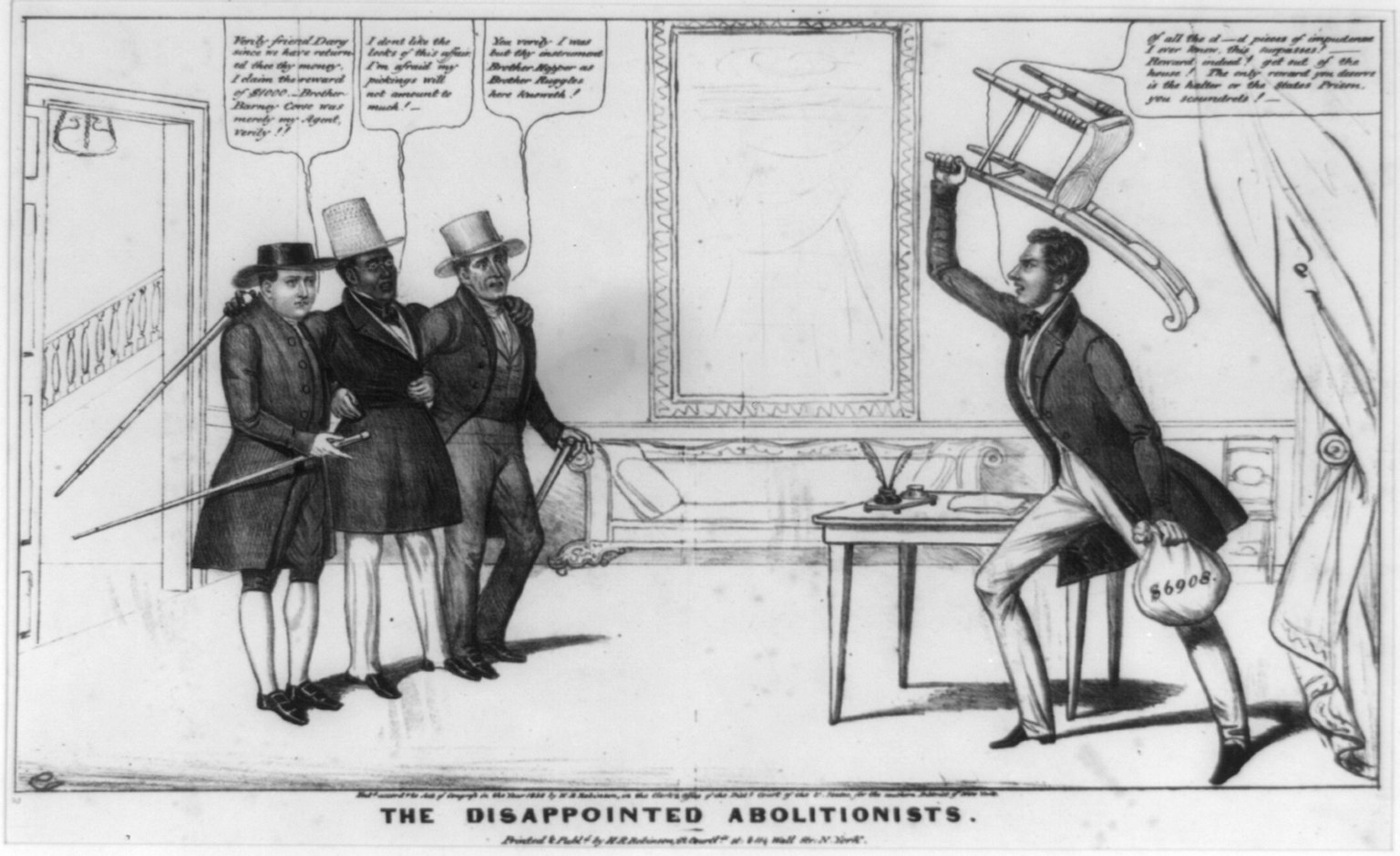
The Disappointed Abolitionists (1838) by artist Edward Williams Clay and lithographer Henry R. Robinson, cartoon of Ruggles (center), with Isaac T. Hopper on his left and Barney Corse on his right, confronting John P. Darg in 1838

David Ruggles (March 15, 1810 – December 16, 1849) was an African-American abolitionist in New York who resisted slavery by his participation in a Committee of Vigilance, which worked on the Underground Railroad to help fugitive slaves reach free states. He was a printer in New York City during the 1830s, who also wrote numerous articles, and "was the prototype for black activist journalists of his time." He claimed to have led more than 600 fugitive slaves to freedom in the North, including Frederick Douglass, who became a friend and fellow activist. Ruggles opened the first African-American bookstore in 1834.

== Early life ==
Ruggles was born in Norwich, Connecticut, in 1810. His parents, David Sr. and Nancy Ruggles, were free African Americans. His father was born in Norwich in 1775 and worked as a journeyman blacksmith. His mother was born in 1785 in either Lyme or Norwich and worked as a caterer. Ruggles was the first of eight children.

His early education took place at religious charity schools in Norwich.

== Bookstore and abolitionist organizing ==
In 1826, at the age of sixteen, Ruggles moved to New York City, where he worked as a mariner before opening a grocery store. Nearby, other African-Americans ran grocery businesses in Golden Hill (John Street east of William Street), such as Mary Simpson (1752-March 18, 1836). After 1829, abolitionist Sojourner Truth (born Isabella ("Bell") Baumfree; c. 1797 – November 26, 1883) also lived in lower Manhattan. At first, he sold liquor, then embraced temperance. He became involved in anti-slavery and the free produce movement. He was a sales agent for and contributor to The Liberator and The Emancipator, abolitionist newspapers. Due to the selling of anti-slavery publications, Ruggle's store was eventually destroyed by a mob.

After closing the grocery, Ruggles opened the first African American-owned bookstore in the United States. The bookstore was located on Lispenard Street near St. John's park in what is today the Tribeca neighborhood. Ruggles's bookstore specialized in abolitionist and feminist literature, including works by African-American abolitionist Maria Stewart. He edited a New York journal called The Mirror of Liberty, and published a pamphlet called The Extinguisher. He also published "The Abrogation of the Seventh Commandment" in 1835, an appeal to northern women to confront husbands who kept enslaved black women as mistresses.

== New York Committee of Vigilance ==
Ruggles was secretary of the New York Committee of Vigilance, a radical biracial organization to aid fugitive slaves, oppose slavery, and inform enslaved workers in New York about their rights in the state. New York had abolished slavery and stated that slaves voluntarily brought to the state by a master would automatically gain freedom after nine months of residence. On occasion, Ruggles went to private homes after learning that enslaved blacks were hidden there, to tell workers that they were free.

Ruggles was especially active against kidnapping bounty hunters (also known as "blackbirds"), who made a living by capturing free Black people in the North and illegally selling them into slavery in the Deep South, as was done to Solomon Northup. With the Vigilance Committee, Ruggles fought for fugitive slaves to have the right to jury trials and helped arrange legal assistance for them. In 1837, Ruggles led efforts to defend William Dixon, who had been accused of being a fugitive slave.

His activism earned him many enemies, including fellow abolitionists who disagreed with his tactics. Ruggles was physically assaulted, and his bookshop was destroyed through arson. He quickly reopened his library and bookshop. There were two known attempts to kidnap him and sell him into slavery in the South. He was criticized for his role in the well-publicized Darg case of 1838, in which Ruggles and other abolitionists sought freedom for Thomas Hughes, a slave accused of robbing his enslaver, a Virginia man named John P. Darg.

In October 1838, Ruggles assisted Frederick Douglass on his journey to freedom, and reunited Douglass with his fiancé Anna Murray. Rev. James Pennington, a self-emancipated slave, married Murray and Douglass in Ruggles's home shortly thereafter. Douglass's autobiography Narrative of the Life of Frederick Douglass explains:

I had been in New York but a few days, when Mr. Ruggles sought me out, and very kindly took me to his boarding-house at the corner of Church and Lespenard Streets. Mr. Ruggles was then very deeply engaged in the memorable Darg case, as well as attending to a number of other fugitive slaves, devising ways and means for their successful escape; and, though watched and hemmed in on almost every side, he seemed to be more than a match for his enemies.

Readable pdf of the First Annual Report of the New York Committee of Vigilance, David Ruggles as secretary

== Later life ==
Ruggles suffered from ill health, which intensified following the Darg case. In 1841, his father died, and Ruggles was ailing and almost blind. In 1842, Lydia Maria Child, a fellow abolitionist and friend, arranged for him to join a radical Utopian commune called the Ross Farm, operated by the Northampton Association of Education and Industry in Florence, Massachusetts.

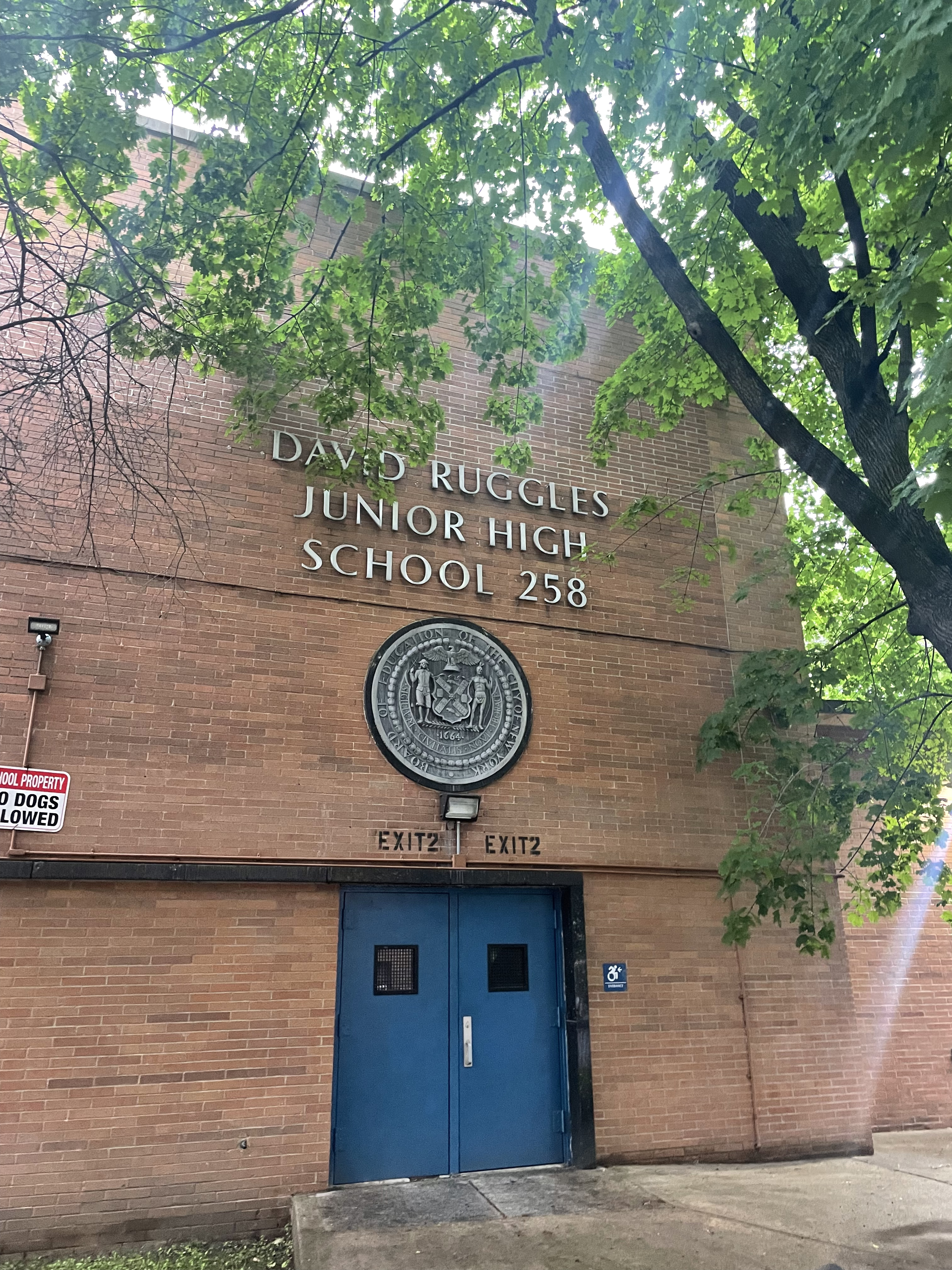
David Ruggles Junior High School in New York City

Applying home treatment upon hydropathic principles, he regained his health to some degree, but not his eyesight. He began practicing hydrotherapy, and by 1845, had established a "water cure" hospital in Florence. This was one of the earliest in the United States. Joel Shew and Russell Thacher Trall (R.T. Trall) had preceded him in using this type of therapy. Ruggles died in Florence in 1849, at age 39, due to a bowel infection.

== Bibliography ==
- Clark, Christopher (1995). The Communitarian Moment: The Radical Challenge of the Northampton Association. Amherst: University of Massachusetts.
- Foner, Eric (2015). Gateway To Freedom: The Hidden History of the Underground Railroad. W.W. Norton and Company. ISBN 978-0-393-24407-6.
- Gaffney, Paul (2004). "Coloring Utopia: The African American Presence in the Northampton Association of Education and Industry". In Christopher Clark; Kerry W. Buckley (eds.). Letters from an American Utopia: The Stetson Family and the Northampton Association, 1843-1847. Amherst, Mass: University of Massachusetts Press. pp. 239–278. ISBN 1-55849-431-6.
- Hodges, Graham Russell (Spring–Summer 2000). "David Ruggles: The Hazards of Anti-Slavery Journalism". Media Studies Journal. 14 (2). Archived from the original on 2007-03-07.
- Hodges, Graham Russell Gao (2010). David Ruggles: A radical black abolitionist and the Underground Railroad in New York City. Chapel Hill: University of North Carolina Press. ISBN 978-0-8078-3326-1.
- General Lafayette (18 January 1830). "(Facsimile of letter from) General Lafayette to David Ruggles".
- Newman, Richard; Rael, Patrick; Lapsansky, Phillip, eds. (2001). "David Ruggles". in Pamphlets of protest: an anthology of early African-American protest. New York: Routledge. pp. 144–155. ISBN 0-415-92443-X. Paperback ISBN 0-415-92444-8
- Porter, Dorothy B. (January 1943). "David Ruggles: An Apostle of Human Rights". Journal of Negro History. 28 (1). Association for the Study of African American Life and History: 23–50. doi:10.2307/2714783. JSTOR 2714783. S2CID 150135247.
- Porter, Dorothy (1995). Early Negro Writing 1760-1837. First published 1971. Baltimore, MD: Black Classic Press. ISBN 0-933121-59-8. Hardback ISBN 0-933121-60-1
- David Ruggles: A Man of Color (1834). The "Extinguisher" extinguished! Or David M. Reese M.D. "Used Up". New York: D. Ruggles. (Note: The title page shows that in authorship, Ruggles pointedly identified himself as "A Man of Color")
