= IMLP =

IMLP may refer to:

- Information Management Leadership Program, certification by General Electric
- Immediate Records, record label
- Incarcerated Mother's Law Project, Women's Prison Association
