= Corsica (disambiguation) =

Corsica is a large French island in the Mediterranean Sea.

It may also refer to:

- Corsica, Pennsylvania, a town in the United States
- Corsica, South Dakota, a town in the United States
- Chevrolet Corsica, an automobile model
- "Corsica and The Satyr", a painting by Artemisia Gentileschi
- Corsica, a frog in the webcomic Sluggy Freelance
- Corsica (album), a folk music album by Petru Guelfucci
- Corsica Coachworks, a British coachbuilding business

== See also ==
- Corsican (disambiguation)
- Corse (disambiguation)
- Corsa (disambiguation)
