= Barney Corse =

American abolitionist (1799–1878)

- Born: November 2, 1799; Camden, Delaware, United States
- Died: March 8, 1878 (aged 78); Flushing, Queens, New York City, New York, United States
- Burial place: Flushing Cemetery, Flushing, Queens, New York City, New York, United States
- Occupations: Abolitionist, leather merchant
- Spouse: Mary Elizabeth Leggett (m. 1823–1878; his death)
- Children: 3

Barney Corse (November 2, 1799 – March 8, 1878) was an American abolitionist, and leather merchant in New York City. He worked with Isaac T. Hopper, and David Ruggles in the anti-slavery movement and to protect fugitive slaves and free Blacks from slave kidnappers.

== Early life and family ==
Barney Corse was born on November 2, 1799, in Camden, Delaware, to parents Lydia Troth and Israel Corse. He had five siblings, and the family was Quaker. His father owned a leather business on Jacob Street in Manhattan. His father remarried and Barney Corse had step-siblings.

Barney Corse married Mary Elizabeth Leggett in 1823, and they had three children.

== Career ==
In 1821, Corse joined his father in the leather business, and the name was changed to Israel Corse and Son. In 1830, Israel retired and Corse's brother in-law Jonathan Thorne joined the business; by 1832, Corse left the entire business to Thorne. In 1842, there was an issue with Israel Corse's land transfer the title of the land for the leather business, and it resulted in a lawsuit and his son Barney Corse filing for bankruptcy.

Corse was a member of the New York Manumission Society. Isaac T. Hopper, David Ruggles, and Corse had often worked together in abolition in New York City. Corse had planned and directed the forerunner of the Quaker-run Underground Railroad in North Carolina.

=== Darg case (1838) ===
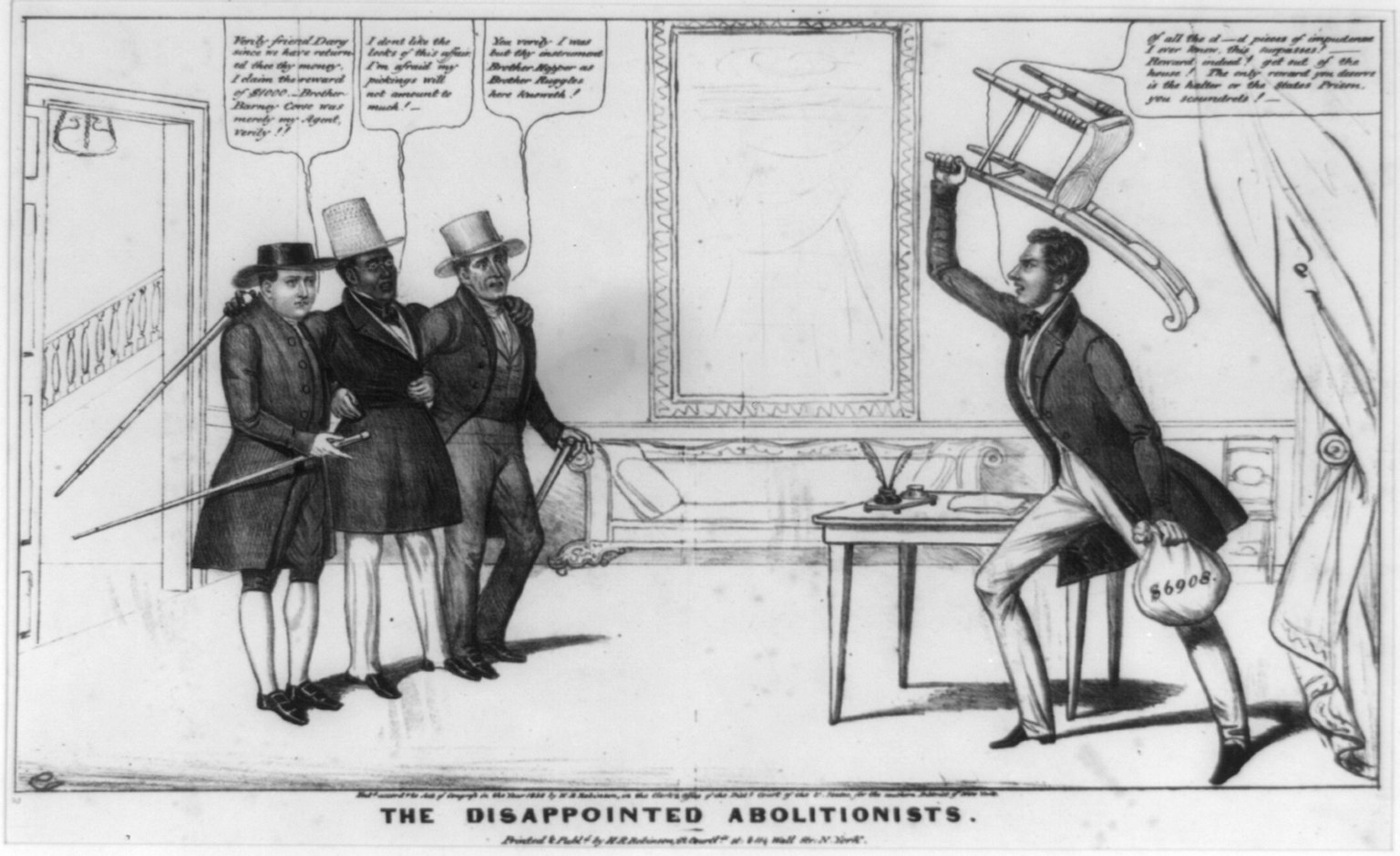
The Disappointed Abolitionists (1838) by artist Edward Williams Clay and lithographer Henry R. Robinson

On August 25, 1838, John P. Darg from Virginia had brought his chattel slave Thomas Hughes with him to New York City; and the state of New York had ended slavery a few years prior in 1827. The laws for bringing human chattel to a free state was not yet defined in 1838. Thomas Hughes went to Isaac Hopper’s house, seeking temporary settlement. Hopper initially was reluctant, and asked Hughes to leave. The next day, The Sun newspaper published a reward for Darg's missing slave Hughs, and stolen money. Hopper, and Corse (and possibly Ruggles) served as go-betweens for Darg and Hughes. The money was spent by Hughes, so Hopper and Corse decided it was moral to return the missing money, so they put up their own money.

The returned amount was less than the stolen amount of money, and Darg ordered Corse and Ruggles arrested for grand larceny. Corse made bail, but Ruggles was jailed for two days. The Disappointed Abolitionists, was a published lithograph caricature of Hopper, Ruggles, and Corse by artist Edward Williams Clay and lithographer Henry R. Robinson. It suggested the trio was more interested in the reward money and extortion, and was not in the business of freeing slaves. Local newspapers caused a furor for exposing the extreme dangers of abolitionist work.

Hughes served two years in prison for the money theft, and after his release he was a free man. Corse was tried as an accessory to the robbery of John P. Darg in the Court of Sessions in New York City on March 8, 1839. The jury couldn’t decide on the outcome of the case and a new trial was ordered. On October 10, 1839, Corse was tried a second time. The case facts were conflicting between the two Corse trials.

== Death ==
Corse died of "paralysis of the heart" (in modern terms most likely sudden cardiac arrest) on March 8, 1878, in Flushing, Queens, New York City.

== See also ==
- List of court cases in the United States involving slavery
- United States v. The Amistad (1841)
