= Flushing Cemetery =

Cemetery in Queens, New York

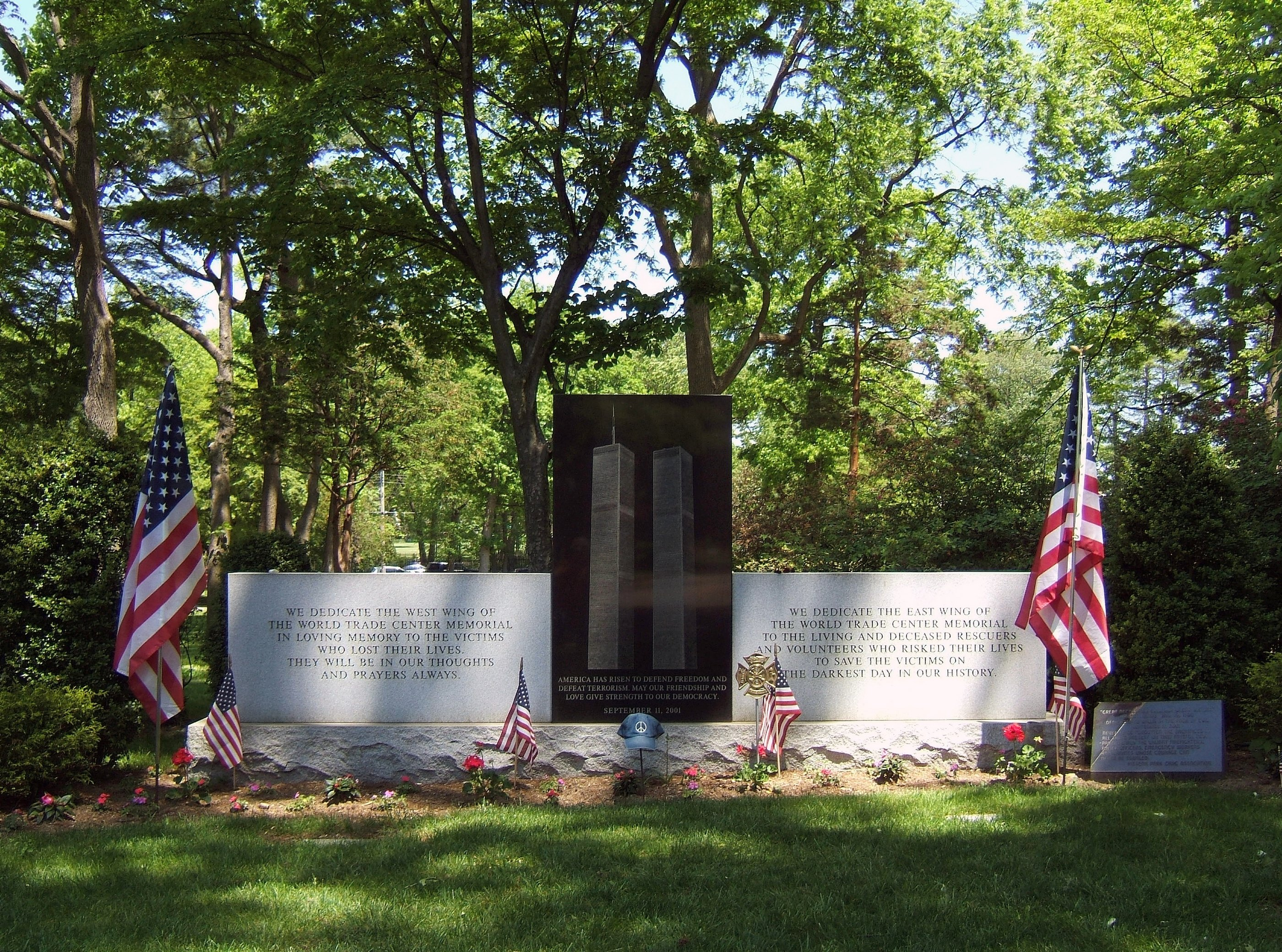
- The 9/11 Memorial at Flushing Cemetery
- Interactive map of Flushing Cemetery

Details
- Established: 1853
- Location: Flushing, New York
- Country: United States
- Coordinates: 40°45′6″N 73°47′58″W
- Find a Grave: Flushing Cemetery
- The Political Graveyard: Flushing Cemetery

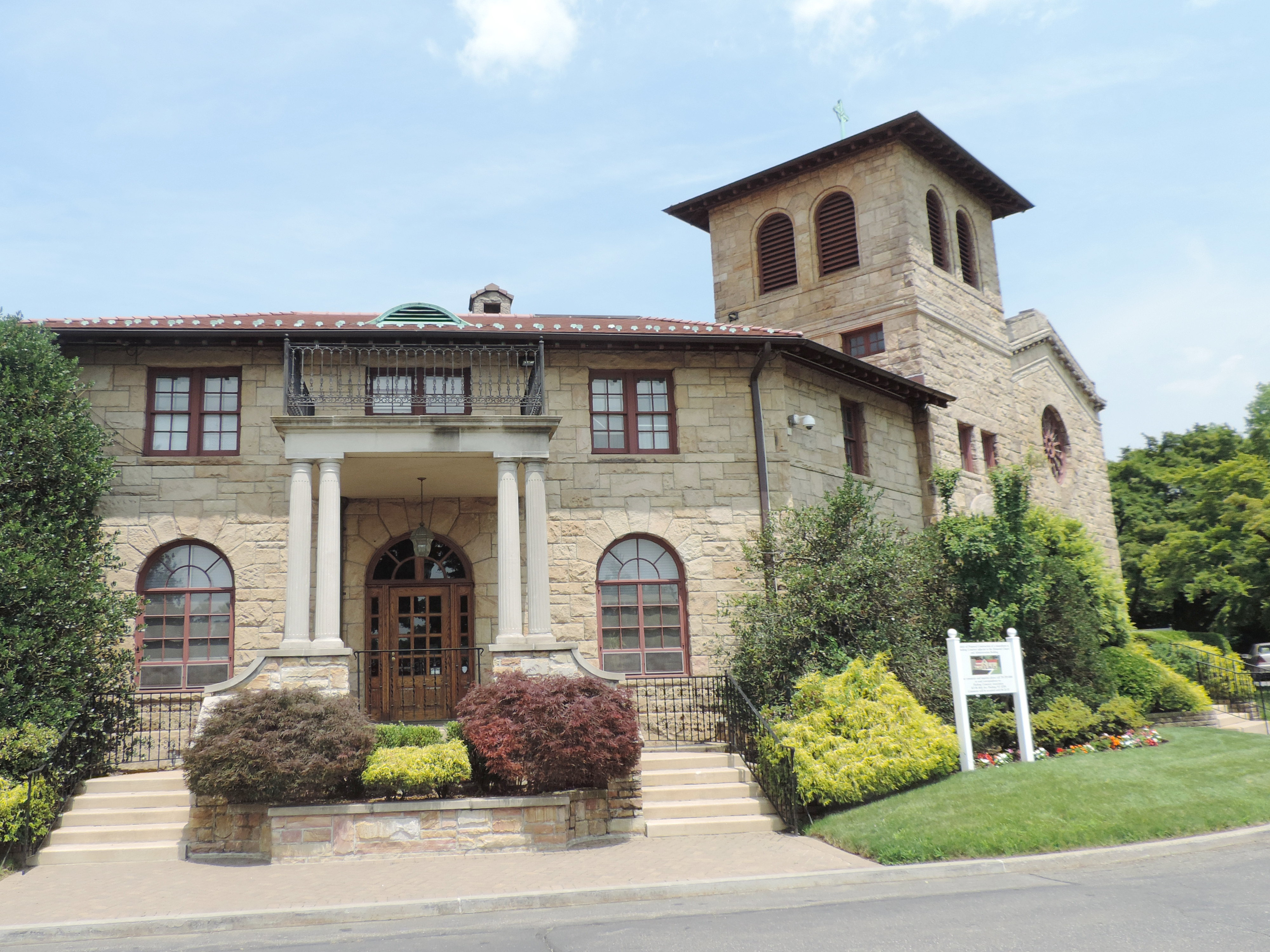
Office

Flushing Cemetery is a cemetery in Flushing in the borough of Queens in New York City, New York.

== History ==
Flushing Cemetery has several predecessors. In 1789 (64 years before the cemetery was founded), George Washington had crossed the East River on a personal mission aboard his barge. Washington, like other noted landowners, journeyed to Flushing: The community was a center of scientific horticulture. The cemetery's floral and arboreal beauty have become a memorial to Flushing's status as a center of horticulture to this day.

During 1853, in which the Flushing Cemetery was founded, the population of Queens County was around 20,000. The land the original site for Flushing Cemetery would rest was the 20-acre John Purchase farm, which was selected by committee. A select number of individuals who attended the founding meeting: Reverend John Gilder, Henry Christie, William Leonard, Caleb Smith, and Robert B. Parsons. Civic-minded citizens like these people had also organized the Flushing Cemetery Association. The day these founders received their charter was May 5, 1853 was the same day in which the World's Fair in New York Crystal Palace was scheduled to open. Civil engineer Horace Daniels was responsible for plotting the grounds. In 1875, the Whitehead Duryea farm, which measured 50 acres and adjoined the cemetery, was purchased and added to the site.

The Bayside Quakers and some of their relatives and neighbors, in about 1860, brought a half-acre within this cemetery in the western half of section I. Section I, which is also referred to as the Quaker Burial Place of Flushing, is where 43 people (the largest in one group) are buried, while 109 were buried in Flushing Cemetery.

The Flushing Cemetery, where 41,000 bodies are buried and thousands more with reservations, has flowers, trees, and greenswards. Roland Schultheis, a scholarly man, became the keeper of the Flushing Cemetery and took great pride in caring for it.

The preservation of the cemetery has also been regarded as a significant task. Individuals with both intelligence and distinguished family backgrounds have preserved its unusual beauty. The cemetery's manager Roland Schultheis was a descendant of the Schultheis Brothers who were internationally famous with their nurseries in Frankfurt, Germany, the largest in Europe: It is possible that Shultheis' ancestors were buried in this cemetery.

== Burials ==
- Louis Armstrong (1901–1971), trumpeter and singer
- Bernard Baruch (1870–1965), businessman
- Laurie Bird (1952–1979), actress and photographer
- Eugene Bullard (1895–1961), the first African-American military pilot
- Ellis Parker Butler (1869–1937), writer
- Adam Clayton Powell Sr. (1865–1953), pastor
- Charles S. Colden (1885–1960), lawyer and judge
- Barney Corse (1799–1878), Quaker abolitionist
- Albert Fish (1870–1936), serial killer, child rapist and cannibal
- Joseph Fitch (1857–1917), lawyer, politician and judge
- Dizzy Gillespie (1917–1993), jazz trumpet player
- Hermann Grab (1903–1949), writer
- Johnny Hodges (1907–1970), saxophonist
- Thomas B. Jackson (1797–1881), politician
- Jan Matulka (1890–1972), Czech-American modern artist
- Lemuel E. Quigg (1863–1919), politician
- May Robson (1858–1942), actress
- Aris San (1940–1992), singer
- Vincent Sardi Sr. (1885–1969), restauranteur
- Hazel Scott (1920–1981), musician and singer
- Charlie Shavers (1920–1971), trumpeter
- Battling Siki (1897–1925), boxer
- Frederic Storm (1844–1935), politician
