= Corsican =

Corsican may refer to:

- Someone or something from Corsica
- Corsicans, inhabitants of Corsica
- Corsican language, a Romance language spoken on Corsica and northern Sardinia
- Corsican Republic, a former country in Europe
- "The Corsicans", the original name of the Hearts of Oak militia in Colonial New York

== See also ==
- List of all pages beginning with "Corsican"
- List of Corsicans
- Corsicana, Texas
- Corsica (disambiguation)
- Corse (disambiguation)
