= Arrest of William Dixon =

In April 1837, William Dixon, a thirty-year old man living in New York City, was arrested and accused of being a fugitive slave. Dixon's case drew wide attention in the city, and an unsuccessful attempt to free him was made outside of the courthouse that he was tried in. Dixon was aided by the New York Committee of Vigilance, led by abolitionist David Ruggles, and eventually declared to be free.

== Kidnapping and attempted escape ==
William Dixon was a thirty-year old man living in New York in the spring of 1837. He was working as a whitewasher. On April 4, a group of white men—Tobias Boudinot, Daniel D. Nash and a Baltimore policeman—arrested him, accusing him of being a fugitive slave. Walter P. Allender, a slaveholder from Baltimore, alleged that Dixon was really a man he had enslaved named Jake, who had escaped five years earlier.

Dixon denied the allegations, maintaining that he had never lived in Baltimore, much less been enslaved by Allender. The ensuing legal case, presided over by the Recorder of New York City Richard Riker, saw witnesses brought by both sides over the course of four months. Allender presented over a dozen who identified Dixon as his former slave, while Dixon's defense brought at least three witnesses who testified that Dixon had been living in Boston and New York before 1832. Historians are divided over Dixon's true story: Eric Foner writes that he was "indeed the fugitive Jake", while J. D. Dickey concludes that the evidence supported his claims to have lived in Boston and New York. Dixon was defended by lawyers including John Hopper and Horace Dresser. Hopper, Dixon's first lawyer in the case, convinced Riker to permit free Black people to testify in the case.

The trial was attended by hundreds of Black New Yorkers—contemporary newspapers published estimates as high as 2,000. They protested outside of the courthouse and along Broadway, advocating "No Slavery" and "Down with Kidnapping". On April 12, (Note: Bonner writes that the judge had stated he needed more time to make a decision on the case, while Foner writes that Riker had decided that Dixon was indeed a fugitive.) members of the crowd that had gathered to follow the trial, estimated at that point to be over 1,000, attempted to rescue him and briefly succeeded, giving Dixon a "large dirk and a Spanish knife", but he was eventually taken into police custody. A number of white Americans vocally disapproved of this effort. The abolitionist Samuel Cornish deemed it a "disgraceful riot," arguing that violence would harm the abolitionist movement.

== Aftermath ==
The New York Committee of Vigilance, led by abolitionist David Ruggles began advocating in Dixon's favor after the initial decision, filing a writ de homine replegiando with the New York Supreme Court. A request for a trial by jury was refused and they then appealed to the Court for the Trial of Impeachments, and the Correction of Errors. The months of legal battles became expensive: Allender reportedly spent $1,500, including $2 a day in jail fees for Dixon, while Ruggles bankrupted himself through his efforts to free Dixon. The Committee of Vigilance eventually raised $500 for Dixon's bail, $300 of which came from donations and fundraising, while the remaining $200 was loaned to Dixon, most likely by a wealthy white person. Dixon reached Canada and the trial was not continued after Allender left New York for Maryland. The Committee of Vigilance eventually got Dixon a seaman's protective certificate which showed that he was free.

Dixon eventually returned to New York and spoke at an annual meeting of the New York Committee of Vigilance in May 1838.

== Bibliography ==
- Bonner, Christopher James (2020). Remaking the Republic: Black Politics and the Creation of American Citizenship. University of Pennsylvania Press. ISBN 978-0-8122-5206-4.
- Dickey, J. D. (2022). The Republic of Violence: The Tormented Rise of Abolition in Andrew Jackson's America. Simon and Schuster. ISBN 978-1-64313-929-6.
- Foner, Eric (2015). Gateway to Freedom: The Hidden History of America's Fugitive Slaves. Oxford University Press. ISBN 978-0-19-873790-2.
- Hodges, Graham Russell (2010). David Ruggles: A Radical Black Abolitionist and the Underground Railroad in New York City. Chapel Hill: University of North Carolina Press. ISBN 978-0-8078-9579-5. OCLC 593326795.
- Murison, Justine S. (2022). Faith in Exposure: Privacy and Secularism in the Nineteenth-Century United States. University of Pennsylvania Press. ISBN 978-1-5128-2352-3.
