= Wilson Marcy Powell Sr. =

Lawyer (1872–1935)

Wilson Marcy Powell Sr. (May 7, 1872 – August 17, 1935) was a Harvard-educated lawyer, president of New York Hospital, and vice-president of the New York City Bar Association.

== Hospital work ==
For 20 years, Powell was counsel for New York Hospital. He became governor and vice-president of the hospital for three years and president for one year. He was also president of the Lying-In Hospital, the New York Nursery and Child's hospital and vice-president of the Manhattan Maternity and Dispensary. Powell was instrumental in bringing together New York Hospital and these other health care organizations into a medical center and unified program for the care of the ill, research and teaching.

== Public service ==
Powell was recognized as a leader in his profession, and served for seven years as treasurer of the New York City Bar Association and then its vice president for two years. After his death, the Association's resolution declared "Our loss in the circle of the wisest counsellors of the Association is well-nigh immeasurable".

Serving on several committees for his alma mater, Harvard University, Powell served as chairman of a committee to raise an endowment for the law school. In 1906, Swarthmore College invited Powell to serve on its Board of Managers. From 1914 to 1920, he was vice-president of the Board and then president until 1933 when poor health forced him to step down.

From 1928 to 1935, Powell was chairman of the Committee on Circulation for the New York Public Library. He made the effort to know all of the employees at the Main Library on Fifth Avenue by sight.

Following his father's work, Powell served as legal adviser to the Women's Prison Association of the City of New York, which was founded by his great-grandfather and Quaker abolitionist Isaac Hopper. He also served on the board of directors for the NAACP, the Colored Orphan Asylum and the Association for the Benefit of Colored Children in the City of New York.

Powell was a rallying spirit among the Friends of New York City and State. For more than 25 years, he served both the New York Yearly and New York Monthly Meeting as its treasurer. His daughter, Elsie Knapp Powell, donated their country estate, the Powell House, to the New York Society of Friends.

== Biography ==
Powell was born in New York City on May 7, 1872. Upon graduating from Harvard University and Harvard Law School, he married Elsie Knapp in 1902. Residing at 130 East 70th Street, they had three children, noted physicist Wilson Marcy Powell, Elsie K. Powell and Sarah Powell (Mrs. Prescott B. Huntington). Powell came from a Quaker family devoted to social justice initiatives. His great-grandfather, Isaac Hopper, assisted more than a thousand slaves escape to freedom, and left his mark on several benevolent activities in New York. His father, Wilson Powell, was also a Harvard-educated lawyer of high standing and devoted his energies to the improvement of hospitals and libraries in New York. Among his great-grandchildren are Mayan archaeologist Christopher Powell and writer-producer J Dakota Powell.
