= William F. Fry =

William Frederick "Jack" Fry (6 December 1921 – 18 July 2011) was an American experimental physicist. Besides physics, he worked on violin acoustics for several decades, and collected books and manuscripts on Italian history.

== Early life and education ==
William F. Fry was born in 1921 on a farm near Carlisle, Iowa. In his childhood, Fry became interested in radios and music. He got his first violin and took private lessons. Several years later he participated in a music competition, and started to give private violin lessons for 25 cents per hour.

In 1939, he started to study electrical engineering and music in the Iowa State, but soon gave up music. During the war, he was in the Naval Research Laboratory in Washington D.C., working on a jamming system to deflect German bombs. At the same time, he went to the George Washington University where George Gamow taught nuclear physics as a night course. After the war, he worked in White Sands, New Mexico working with German V-2 rockets.

== Physics ==
Fry got a PhD in physics in 1951 from the Iowa State University; his experiments included flying nuclear emulsion on air balloons to get it exposed to cosmic rays. He published his results in an Italian journal, which were noticed by Enrico Fermi. After the PhD, he became a postdoc in the University of Chicago, working on cyclotron with Marcel Schein and Fermi.

In 1952, Fry began a program in experimental high-energy physics at the UW-Madison, and led it until 1988. He became a full professor in 1956. His group was one of the first to get funding for high-energy physics from the United States Atomic Energy Commission. He worked on K mesons; Werner Heisenberg once told him that he "probably know more about K^{0} meson physics that anybody else". Fry retired in 1998.

== Violin acoustics and Italian history ==
Besides physics, Fry was interested in violin acoustics and the Italian history.

Fry gave up music during his undergraduate studies, and didn't play violin until 1960s, when he befriended Wilson Powell, an experimental physicist from California and an amateur pianist. Powell once suggested Fry to play together, and brought him a "Strat and a Galliano" violins from the university. Fry then realised that some of his issues with violin were because of the poor instrument he had, and became interested in violin acoustics and in the distinction between ordinary and great violins, like Stradivari's. He found a violin maker in Madison, Larry LeMay, who taught him how to make violins. Together with Powell, Fry created a method to inspect violins that didn't destruct the instrument. He published a book and a DVD about the subject, and taught "Acoustics for Musicians" in the university.

Fry first travelled to Italy in 1954. He won a Fulbright lectureship and spent time in Padova and Milan. There, he became interested in the origins of Fascism in Italy, but soon expanded his interests to earlier Italian history and culture:

So I became more and more interested in learning about what Danilo [Nogarotto] would do if he were a man of 1700 living in Padova. What would his life be like as a person? What touches his life? What controls his life? What frustrated him? Where were his joys? What did he believe? Reaction to the church. Reaction to all these sorts of things. And so my focus became slowly more and more of trying to understand the lives of the individual people at all times in Italy.

Fry started to collect Italian books, first with no intention to create a specialized collection, but eventually amassed over 40 thousand books, manuscripts, newspapers, diaries, and other documents that are now in the Fry Collection of the UW-Madison Libraries.
