= Corse (surname) =

Corse is a European surname with several apparently independent origins. An English origin traces to Corse, Gloucestershire, a location in South West England. A Scottish origin can be traced to one of several specific locations in Scotland, or to a location type, as in a locale resembling a "cross". Another origin appears from Scandinavia as a 17th-century variant of the surname Carsten. The United Kingdom and Scandinavia may not account for all origins of the 'Corse' surname, as records show that the largest number of immigrants (albeit yet small) into the United States bearing this surname originated in Italy and Sardinia. One point of origin of the Corse surname into the United States was through the person of James Corse in the late 17th century, on whom a significant amount of genealogical research has been expended.

"Corse" was apparently uncommon in 19th and 20th century United States and England. In 1891 the surname was found in London and several counties of England (7 of 39) and Wales (1 of 13). In the United States in 1840, the surname was concentrated in New York, Vermont and to a lesser extent in Pennsylvania with a smattering in the remaining states (total of 10 out of 26). From 1840 to 1920, instances of the surname spread to most continental states (missing in 15 states of 50, including Alaska and Hawaii).

== People with the surname Corse ==
The Corse surname is shared by several notable people:

- Barney Corse (1799–1878), American abolitionist
- Montgomery D. Corse (1816–1895), American Civil War officer
- John M. Corse (1835–1893), American state politician and Civil War General

== See also ==
- Forbes of Corse
