= Corsa atribasis =

Scientific classification
- Kingdom: Animalia
- Phylum: Arthropoda
- Clade: Pancrustacea
- Class: Insecta
- Order: Lepidoptera
- Superfamily: Noctuoidea
- Family: Erebidae
- Subfamily: Calpinae
- Genus: Corsa; Walker, 1858
- Species: C. atribasis

Binomial name
- Corsa atribasis Hampson, 1926

Species of moth

Corsa atribasis is the only species in the monotypic moth genus Corsa of the family Erebidae. The genus was erected by Francis Walker in 1858. The species was first described by George Hampson in 1926. It is found in Sri Lanka.
