= Wilson Marcy Powell =

American physicist

Wilson Marcy Powell (July 18, 1903 – March 2, 1974) was an American physicist and a member of the physics department at the University of California, Berkeley.

== Biography ==
The son of Harvard lawyer Wilson Marcy Powell Sr. and Elsie Knapp, Wilson was born in Litchfield, Connecticut. He matriculated into Harvard College in 1922 and graduated in 1926. During his undergraduate years, Powell went on two solar eclipse expeditions sponsored by Swarthmore College. He participated in his final eclipse expedition to the Arctic Circle nearly 50 years later.

At the behest of his father, Powell entered Harvard Law School in 1926. However, he had always known that he wanted to do physics and was unable to focus on his law studies. His mother, Elsie persuaded her husband to allow their son to withdraw from the law school after a year and to begin graduate work in physics at Harvard. Powell completed a Ph.D. in physics in 1933 under Theodore Lyman IV.

== Early career ==
Powell worked as an assistant teacher at Harvard and Radcliffe from 1933 to 1935, and took on additional work at the Woods Hole Oceanographic Institute. He taught physics at Connecticut College from 1935 to 1937, and then Kenyon College in Ohio from 1937 to 1941.

== Research on cosmic rays ==
In 1935, Powell became a research fellow at the Franklin Institute's Bartol Laboratory and began investigation of cosmic rays. During the Depression years, funds for research were difficult to secure. Powell managed to obtain financing for his research on cosmic rays and the construction of bigger and better cloud chambers from the Rumford Fund of the American Academy of Arts and Sciences, the Carnegie Institute, the Committee on Research of the American Philosophical Society and the Fund for Astrophysical Research. While at Bartol, Powell constructed two cloud chambers for cosmic ray study and developed a source of light at a much lower cost than the lighting used at the time.

Awarded a Guggenheim Fellowship in 1941, Powell put together the Kenyon Cosmic Ray Expedition, and took a cloud chamber to the top of Mount Blue Sky in Colorado. He was searching for a heavier-than-electron particle, known as the "mesotron." In a 17-foot-long trailer, a laboratory on wheels at a height of 14,125 feet, Powell and assistant Henry Meyer took about 12,000 photographs in order to capture a photo of the particle. He had made improvements to the cloud chamber, such as a new lighting system that enabled him to take pictures in one thirty-thousandth of a second. During this expedition, Henry Allen Moe, then president of the Guggenheim Foundation, Professor Raymond Birge, head of the physics department at the University of California, Berkeley, and German physicist Hans Bethe visited the mountaintop laboratory. In 1941, Powell went to the University of California, Berkeley to continue cosmic ray research with Robert Brode.

== Scientific contribution during the Manhattan Project ==
Upon finishing the Guggenheim Fellowship in 1942, Powell began work in the Manhattan Project. He became head of the magnet group, which designed the magnets for the calutrons. Developed by Ernest O. Lawrence, these large machines were used to separate uranium isotopes. Powell worked on the pilot models first at the Radiation Laboratory at University of California, Berkeley and then on the racetracks at Oak Ridge, Tennessee.

== Postwar work at the radiation laboratory ==
Powell was made an associate professor of physics at the University of California, Berkeley in 1946, and continued to lead the magnet group at the Radiation Laboratory after the war. He contributed to the development of the 184-inch synchrocyclotron and the 300 MeV electron synchrotron. He also constructed the 30-inch propane chamber. He introduced the use of scotchlite to illuminate the bubble chamber and was actively involved in the design of Argonne Laboratory's 12-foot heavy liquid chamber.

In 1951, he was made a professor of physics at Berkeley. While directing the research of 33 Ph.D. students, Powell and his colleagues at the Lawrence Berkeley Laboratory published approximately 40 papers. Because Powell held a particular interest in optics, he taught the upper level optics courses.

== Musical interests ==
Powell played several instruments, including the piano and the violin, which he taught himself in his sixties. Collaborating with William F. Fry, an experimental physicist at the University of Wisconsin, Powell conducted research on the construction on violins, measuring such famous instruments as the Stradivarius and Guarnerius violins. The prototypes of the violins created were given to students. One was given to his granddaughter Heidi Powell Priddy.

== Personal life ==
Powell married Fredrika Richardson in 1930 in Cambridge, Massachusetts. They had three children, Wilson M., David Richardson and Fredrika. They divorced in 1955. Powell married Dorothy J. Gardner in 1956, and adopted her daughter Claire. His grandchildren from Wilson M. include Mayan Archaeologist Christopher Powell, Cyber Security Consultant Gordon Powell, artist/filmmaker Heidi Powell Priddy, and Architect Benjamin Powell. Grandchildren from David Richardson include writer-producer J Dakota Powell and Gregory Powell. Grandchildren from Fredrika (Mrs. James Spillman) include Eric Spillman, Meg Spillman and Toby Spillman.

== Publications ==
- Powell, Wilson M. (1940-09-01). "Photon Production of Mesotrons". Physical Review. 58 (5). American Physical Society (APS): 474. Bibcode:1940PhRv...58..474P. doi:10.1103/physrev.58.474.2. ISSN 0031-899X.
- Powell, Wilson M. (1946-05-01). "A Cloud-Chamber Analysis of Cosmic Rays at 14,120 Ft". Physical Review. 69 (9–10). American Physical Society (APS): 385–405. Bibcode:1946PhRv...69..385P. doi:10.1103/physrev.69.385. ISSN 0031-899X.
- Tracy, J.; Powell, W.M. (1949), Star Fragments in Oxygen and Helium under Bombardment by 90 MeV Neutrons, University of California, Berkeley, Radiation Laboratory
- Brueckner, K.; Powell, W.M. (1949), Charged Particles Emitted by Carbon Bombarded by 90 MeV Neutrons, University of California, Berkeley, Radiation Laboratory
- Powell, Wilson M. (1949). "A 22-Inch Wilson Cloud Chamber in a Magnetic Field of 21,700 Gauss" (PDF). Review of Scientific Instruments. 20 (6). AIP Publishing: 403–407. Bibcode:1949RScI...20..403P. doi:10.1063/1.1741555. ISSN 0034-6748. PMID 18151152.
- Powell, Wilson M.; Hartsough, Walter; Hill, Milton (1951-01-15). "The X-Ray Spectrum Produced by 322-Mev Electrons Striking a Platinum Target". Physical Review. 81 (2). American Physical Society (APS): 213–218. Bibcode:1951PhRv...81..213P. doi:10.1103/physrev.81.213. hdl:2027/mdp.39015086480541. ISSN 0031-899X. S2CID 123486065.
- Knapp, Myron W.; Powell, Wilson M. (1956-02-01). "Negative Pions from Neutron Bombardment of Deuterons". Physical Review. 101 (3). American Physical Society (APS): 1110–1115. Bibcode:1956PhRv..101.1110K. doi:10.1103/physrev.101.1110. hdl:2027/mdp.39015086549089. ISSN 0031-899X.
- Powell, W.M.; Oswald, L.O. (November 30, 1956), The Geneva Cloud Chamber, University of California, Berkeley, Radiation Laboratory
- Fowler, William B.; Lander, Richard L.; Powell, Wilson M. (1959-02-01). "NeutralKMeson as a Particle Mixture". Physical Review. 113 (3). American Physical Society (APS): 928–934. Bibcode:1959PhRv..113..928F. doi:10.1103/physrev.113.928. ISSN 0031-899X.
- Goldhaber, Gerson; Fowler, William B.; Goldhaber, Sulamith; Hoang, T. F.; Kalogeropoulos, Theodore E.; Powell, Wilson M. (1959-08-15). "Pion-Pion Correlations in Antiproton Annihilation Events". Physical Review Letters. 3 (4). American Physical Society (APS): 181–183. Bibcode:1959PhRvL...3..181G. doi:10.1103/physrevlett.3.181. ISSN 0031-9007. S2CID 16160176.
- Goldhaber, Sulamith; Goldhaber, Gerson; Powell, Wilson M.; Silberberg, Rein (1961-03-01). "Antiproton Annihilations in Propane". Physical Review. 121 (5). American Physical Society (APS): 1525–1533. Bibcode:1961PhRv..121.1525G. doi:10.1103/physrev.121.1525. ISSN 0031-899X. S2CID 123069376.
- Kernan, Anne; Powell, Wilson M.; Sandler, Carl L.; Knight, William L.; Stannard, F. Russell (1964-03-09). "Muonic-Decay Branching Ratio of the Lambda Hyperon". Physical Review. 133 (5B). American Physical Society (APS): B1271 – B1273. Bibcode:1964PhRv..133.1271K. doi:10.1103/physrev.133.b1271. ISSN 0031-899X.
- Gidal, George; Powell, Wilson M.; March, Robert; Natali, Sergio (1964-07-20). "Polarization of the Muon from K_{μ3}^{+} Decay". Physical Review Letters. 13 (3). American Physical Society (APS): 95–98. Bibcode:1964PhRvL..13...95G. doi:10.1103/physrevlett.13.95. ISSN 0031-9007.
