= Abigail Hopper Gibbons =

American abolitionist (1801–1893)

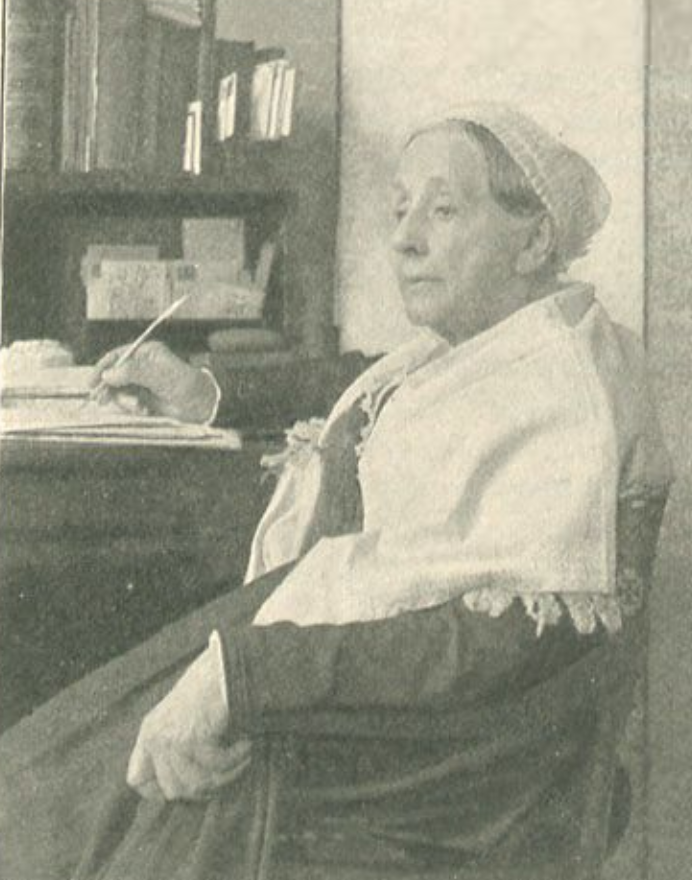
- Abigail Hopper Gibbons, from an 1895 publication
- Born: December 7, 1801; Philadelphia, Pennsylvania
- Died: January 16, 1893 (aged 91); New York City, New York
- Resting place: Green-Wood Cemetery in Brooklyn, New York
- Other name: Abby
- Occupations: school teacher, abolitionist
- Known for: abolitionism, social activism, prison reformation
- Spouse: James Sloan Gibbons (m. 1833; died 1892)
- Children: William, Sarah Hopper, Julia, Lucy, Isaac, James
- Parents: Isaac Hopper (father); Sarah Tatum Hopper (mother)

Abigail Hopper Gibbons (née Hopper; December 7, 1801 – January 16, 1893) was an American abolitionist, schoolteacher, and social welfare activist. She assisted in founding and led several nationally known societies for social reform during and following the American Civil War.

She grew up in Philadelphia, Pennsylvania, in a Quaker family. Her father, Isaac Hopper, opposed slavery (as did many among Quakers by then) and aided fugitive slaves. She grew to share her father's beliefs and spent much of her life working for social reform in several fields. In 1841, the New York Monthly Meeting disowned Gibbons' father and husband for their anti-slavery writing. Abigail Gibbons resigned the following year, also removing her minor children.

Gibbons was prominent during and after the American Civil War. Her work in Philadelphia, Washington, D.C., and New York City was for civil rights and education for Black Americans, prison reform for women, medical care for Union officers during the war, aid to veterans returning from the war, to help them find work; and welfare. Because Gibbons was a known abolitionist, her house was among those attacked and destroyed during the New York City draft riots of July 1863.

== Early life and career ==
Abigail Hopper was born in Philadelphia in 1801, the third of ten children. She was informally called Abby. Both her parents were proud abolitionists. Her father, Isaac Tatem Hopper, was of the Hicksite branch of Quakers. Her mother, Sarah Tatum Hopper, became a recommended minister for the Society of Friends and oversaw schools for black children, along with a committee.

Pennsylvania had abolished slavery and many free people of color lived in Philadelphia. Her father became an active and leading member of The Pennsylvania Abolition Society. He often directly confronted slave kidnappers, who frequented Philadelphia and sometimes kidnapped free blacks for sale into slavery, as well as capturing fugitive slaves to return to their masters for bounties. Called upon to protect the rights of African Americans, Isaac Hopper and his wife garnered a reputation as friends and advisers of the "oppressed race" in all emergencies. The Hoppers also sheltered many poor Quakers in their house, despite their own family's large size and the father's unstable financial status. From their early years, their children were called to aid others.

Both of Hopper's parents came from historically Quaker families and raised their children in that religion. Hopper and her siblings attended Friends' schools while growing up, and lived with these beliefs. In 1821, she also founded a school that practiced Quaker beliefs. On June 26 1827, Abigail, along with her siblings and parents transferred their membership to the Darby Friends Meeting. In 1830, Hopper moved to New York and became a teacher at a Quaker school.

Abigail grew up to share her parents' abolitionist sentiments. She worked with well-known abolitionists of her time, including Lydia Maria Child, Sarah Moore Grimké, William Lloyd Garrison, and Theodore Dwight Weld. Hopper joined the Manhattan Anti-Slavery Society in 1841, which was then a predominately African-American organization in membership. It protested all-white memberships of other abolition societies, including the Ladies' New York City Anti-Slavery Society.

== Marriage and family ==
On February 14, 1833, Abigail Hopper married James Sloan Gibbons, a fellow Hicksite Quaker from New York, who was also an ardent abolitionist in New York City. In 1836, the couple moved to New York City. They had six children together - William, Sarah, Julia, Lucy, Isaac, and James. Isaac and James died in infancy. William died suddenly after an accident while he was attending Harvard University. Their daughters included Sarah Hopper Emerson, who published an edited collection of her mother's letters and a short biography of her; and Lucy Gibbons Morse (who married James Herbert Morse and had a family).

== Quaker rejection ==
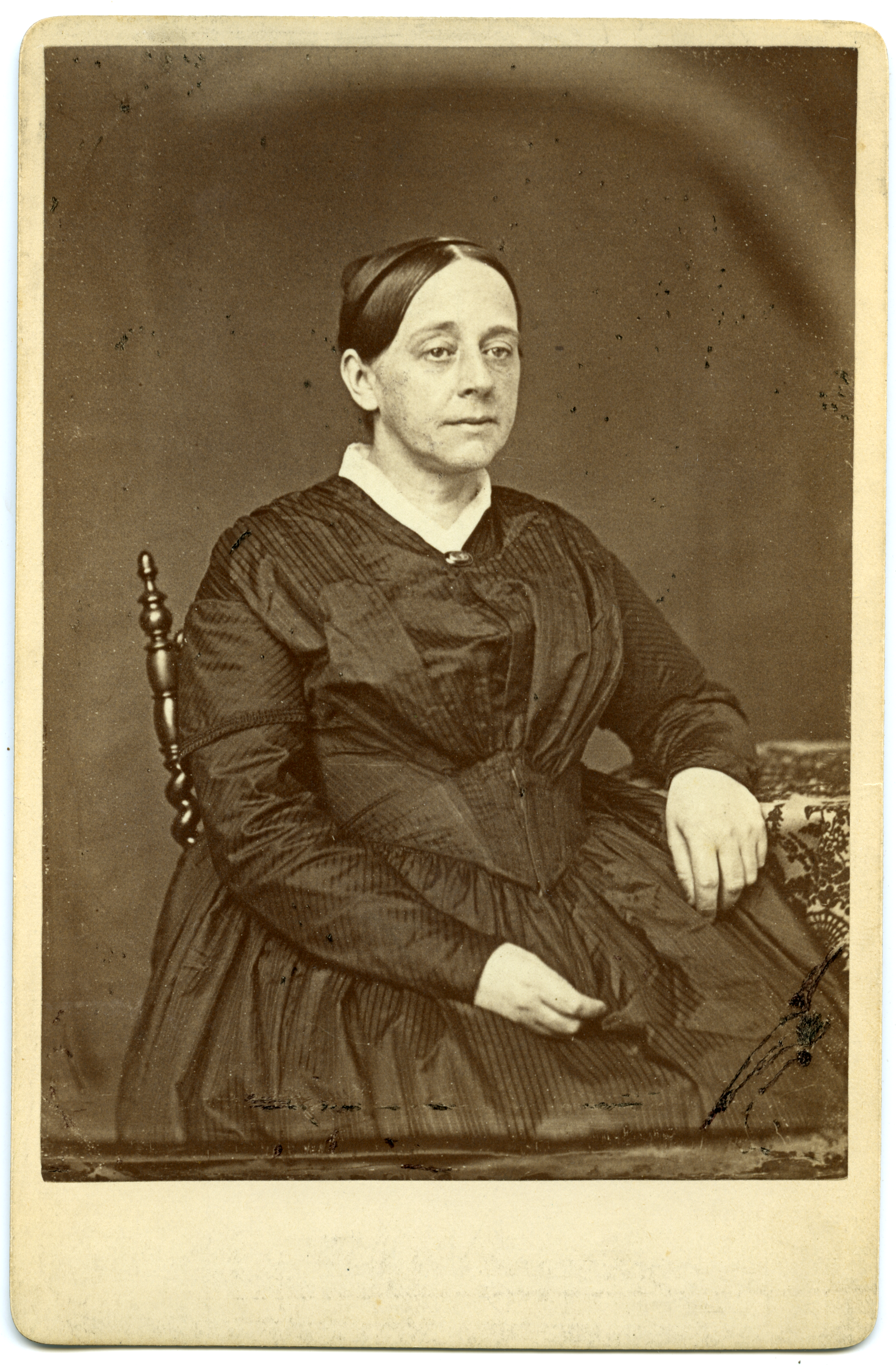
Photograph of Abby Hopper Gibbons

Some Quaker yearly meetings divided due to influences from deism, as well as differences between urban and rural members. In 1841, the New York Monthly Meeting, which was dominated by Hicksites, disowned Abigail's father Isaac Hopper and her husband James Sloan Gibbons for their writing and other activities against slavery. The following year Abigail Hopper Gibbons resigned from the Meeting in protest, also removing her and James' four minor children. She and her family maintained Quaker practices and faith but did not rejoin the Meeting.

== Women's Prison Association ==
Gibbons became involved in a variety of social reform movements. For twelve years in New York, she was also president of a German industrial school for street children. In 1845, she and her father founded the Women's Prison Association (WPA) of New York City. She lobbied the city government for improvements in the city's prisons, advocated the hiring of police matrons, and urged the construction of separate prisons for women. They were then housed in the same facilities as men, and at risk of abuses. She frequently visited the various prisons in and around New York City.

Under her leadership, in 1853 the WPA separated from its parent, the Prison Association, and Gibbons obtained a New York State charter for her group. She led an aggressive program of legislative lobbying at the city and state level to improve prison conditions for women. She protested jail overcrowding and demanded that women prisoners be searched only by female matrons. She also believed that it would be beneficial for her proposed female prisons to be run by women as well.

== Civil War ==
With the outbreak of the American Civil War, Gibbons knew that nurses would be needed to care for the wounded. The United States Sanitary Commission was established in 1861, shortly after the Civil War began, to recruit nurses and to provide adequate medical care to the Union wounded. It would undertake numerous fundraising efforts to raise money for these purposes. When the Commission set up a training base at Davids Island Hospital in New York, Gibbons was among the trainees.

In the South, she worked closely with contrabands, escaped slaves who often sought refuge behind Union lines. Hopper helped them with childbirth and other familial issues. She also collected donations from those in the North and gave them to the contraband slaves. Additionally, she used her wages to help pay for medical expenses encountered by patients who resided in a contraband camp.

Gibbons traveled to Washington, D.C., to help at the Washington Office Hospital, where she aided wounded officers and distributed supplies. She also helped to establish two field hospitals in Virginia. At Point Lookout, Maryland, the federal government took over a hotel and 100 guest cottages, converting them into a hospital complex with accommodations for 1500 soldiers. It was named Hammond General Hospital. Gibbons vied with Dorothea Dix, the Union Superintendent of Nurses, for control of the hospital. She finally gained an appointment as its head matron. In 1863 she left the facility after the hospital was adapted for use as the Point Lookout Confederate Prison.

In New York City, social tensions increased with the imposition of the draft. Many Irish immigrant working men did not support the war or abolition of slavery; they resented being drafted when wealthier men could pay for substitutes to take their places. With the Emancipation Proclamation of 1863, they feared more job competition by blacks and the loss of work or being driven to lower wages. During the New York Draft Riots, ethnic Irish led mob attacks against individual blacks, their residences, and businesses, as well as against the Colored Orphan Asylum, in the largest civil insurrection in United States history. (The orphans were saved but the building burned.) The rioters also attacked residences of known white abolitionists and prominent Republicans. On Tuesday, July 14, 1863, the Gibbons' Manhattan home at 19 Lamartine Place (now 339 West 29th Street) was burned and destroyed by rioters.

== Post-war ==
Following the war, Gibbons founded the Labor and Aid Society in New York, which aided returning veterans find work. To further her mission with women prisoners, she co-founded The Isaac T. Hopper Home, named for her father. It assisted former women prisoners to integrate into society after their release. As a result of her working on notable social reform movements, Gibbons corresponded with other nationally prominent leaders, including Lydia Maria Child, Joseph H. Choate, and Theodore Roosevelt.

Her concern for women and children led Gibbons to found the New York Diet Kitchen (to serve infants, the elderly and the poor). She had also served as the co-founder and president of the New York Committee for the Prevention and Regulation of Vice, directed to control prostitution, drinking and gambling.

Gibbons remained active in reform concerns into old age, and in her later years dressed dolls in Quaker dress to present to quarantined and hospitalized children.

== Death ==
Gibbons died of pneumonia in New York in 1893, aged 91. She was eulogized in her obituary as "one of the most remarkable women of the century" for her work in noted reform movements. She is interred at Green-Wood Cemetery in Brooklyn, New York.

== Legacy ==
- Her daughter Sarah Emerson Gibbons edited and wrote a biography of Abigail Hopper Gibbons, published in 1896, which was based in part on her letters.
- The WPA has continued, providing programs through which women can acquire the life skills needed to gain and keep employment, manage finances, and to make good choices for themselves and their families. It is the nation's oldest advocacy organization working exclusively with women prisoners.
