= Corse (disambiguation) =

Corse is the French name for Corsica, a large island in the Mediterranean Sea, and the Corsican language. It may also refer to:

== Places ==
- Corse (department), a former department of France (1790–1793, 1811–1976)
- Cap Corse, a peninsula in northern Corsica
- Corse, Gloucestershire, England, a village

== Vessels ==
- SS Corse (1894), a French Navy troopship sunk in World War I
- MS Corse (1966), the former name of the MS Express Samina passenger ferry
- MS Corse (1983), a French cruise ferry operated by SNCM
- Corse (ship), a French Navy ship commissioned in 1850

== People ==
- Corse (surname), a European surname of multiple origins (and a list of people with that name)

== Other uses ==
- Corse Castle in Scotland
- Opération Corse, the start of an abbreviated civil war that precipitated the fall of the Fourth French Republic in 1958

== See also ==
- Corse-du-Sud, a French department
- Haute-Corse, a French department
- Corsa (disambiguation)
