= Isaac Hopper =

American Quaker abolitionist (1771–1852)

Isaac Tatem Hopper
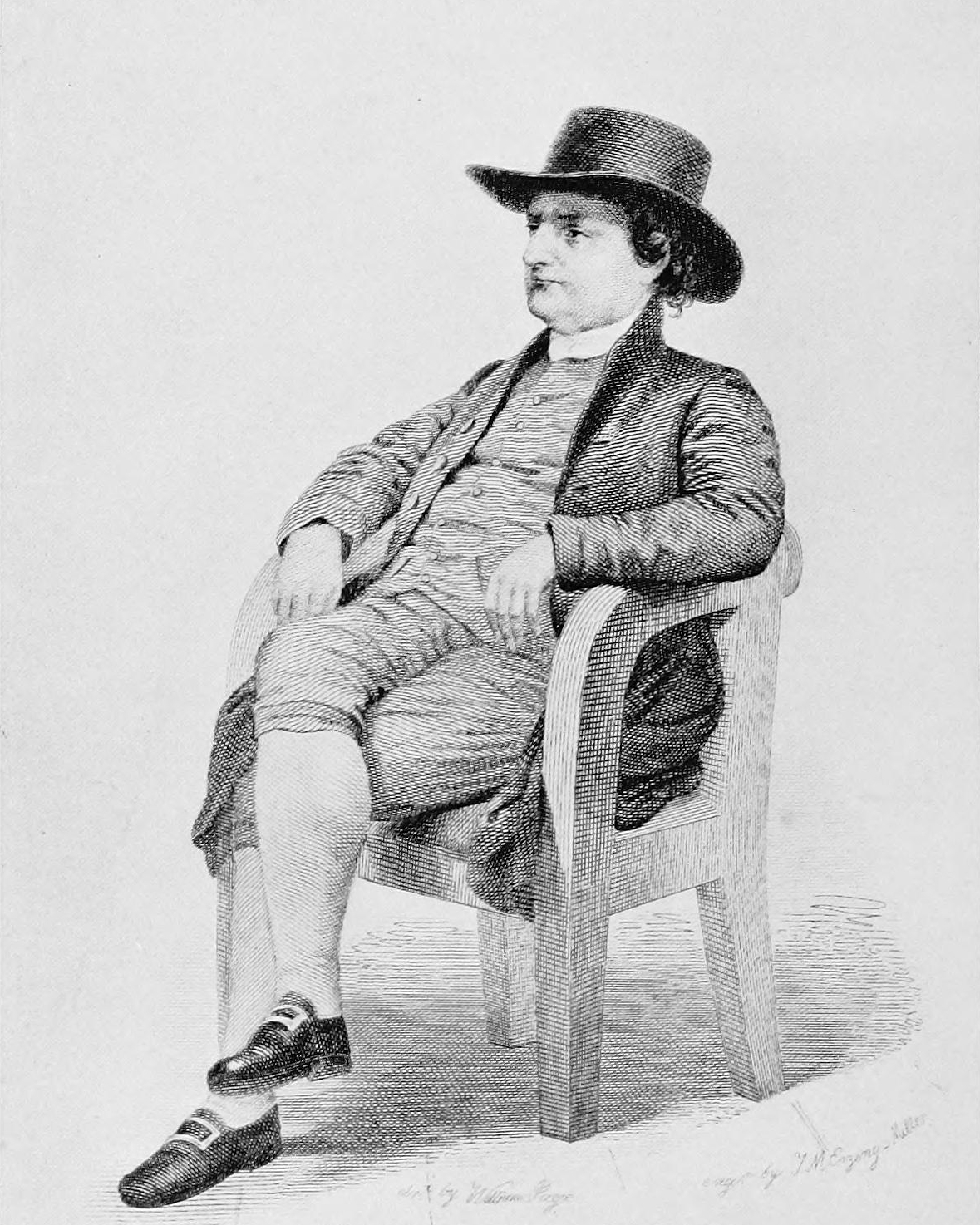
- Hopper depicted in an 1898 illustration
- Born: December 3, 1771; Deptford Township, New Jersey, U.S.
- Died: May 7, 1852 (aged 80); New York City, New York, U.S.
- Occupations: Philanthropist, Children's Village co-founder
- Spouse: Sarah Tatum Hopper

Isaac Tatem Hopper (December 3, 1771 – May 7, 1852) was an American abolitionist who was active in Philadelphia and New York City in the anti-slavery movement and protecting fugitive slaves and free blacks from slave kidnappers. He was also co-founder of Children's Village with 23 others.

He moved to New York City in 1829 to run a Quaker bookstore. From 1841 to 1845 he served as treasurer and book agent for the American Anti-Slavery Society. In 1845 he became active in prison reform and devoted the rest of his life to the Prison Association of New York.

== Life and career ==
Hopper was born into a Quaker family in Deptford Township, New Jersey in 1771. He married Sarah Tatum Hopper in 1795 and together they had ten children, including notable abolitionist Abigail Hopper Gibbons, and a notable grandson DeWolf Hopper.

He became a Hicksite Quaker and a follower of Elias Hicks. On June 26, 1827, he and his family transferred their membership to the Darby Friends Meeting.

Following the American Revolutionary War, Pennsylvania abolished slavery before the end of the 18th century. The state, and especially the major port city of Philadelphia, became a destination and byway for fugitive slaves escaping the South. In the years before the American Civil War, Philadelphia was frequented by slave kidnappers, who often would capture free black children to sell into slavery, as well as hunt fugitive slaves to return to their owners for reward. In the end, Hopper saved around 3,300 slaves.

Hopper became an active and leading member of the Pennsylvania Abolition Society, whose members frequently worked to protect the rights of African Americans, as well as to seek the end of slavery in the United States. In time, Hopper became known in Philadelphia as a friend and adviser to blacks in all emergencies.

Hopper was an overseer of the Negro School for Children in Philadelphia, which was founded by the early abolitionist Anthony Benezet before the Revolutionary War and operated through the nineteenth century. Hopper also served as a volunteer teacher in a free school for African-American adults.

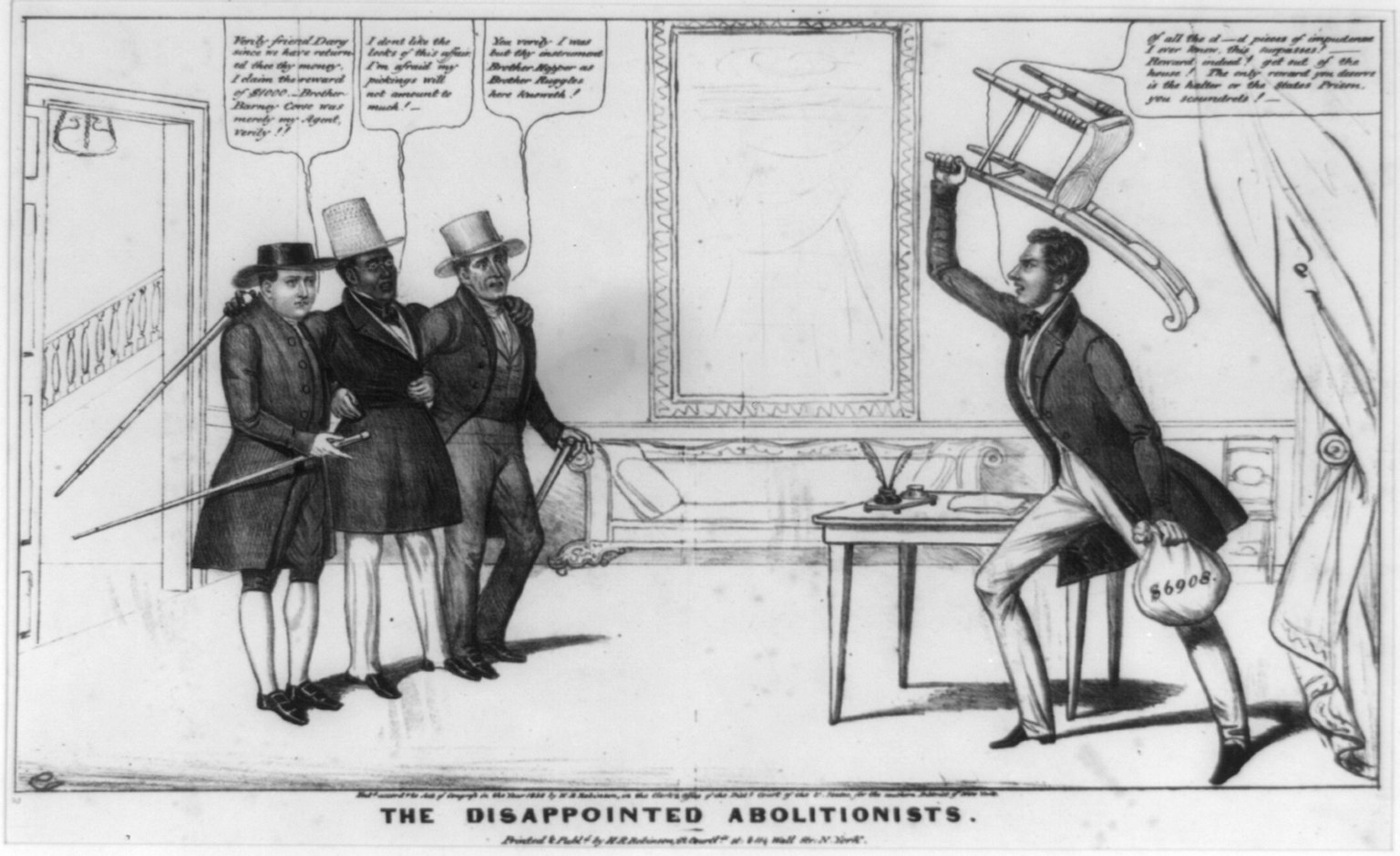
The Disappointed Abolitionists (1838) by artist Edward Williams Clay and lithographer Henry R. Robinson, lampooning Hopper along with Barney Corse and David Ruggles as they face off with John P. Darg

He was one of the founders and the secretary of a society for the employment of the poor; a volunteer prison inspector; a member of a fire company, and a guardian of abused apprentices. Married and with a large family, he and his wife often extended their limited resources to take in more impoverished Quakers. Their children learned early to care for others. He also transacted much business for the Society of Friends.

In 1829, Hopper moved his family to New York to run a bookstore established by the Hicksite Quakers. In the autumn of 1830, being called to Ireland on business connected with his wife's estate, he visited England. In both countries, he was at first treated somewhat cavalierly by the orthodox Quakers, and was pointed out as the one "who has given Friends so much trouble in America." His amiable personality changed their unfavorable impressions.

By the spring of 1841, the demand for Hicksite books had greatly diminished. Hopper became the treasurer and book agent for the American Anti-Slavery Society in New York.

== Prison reform advocacy ==
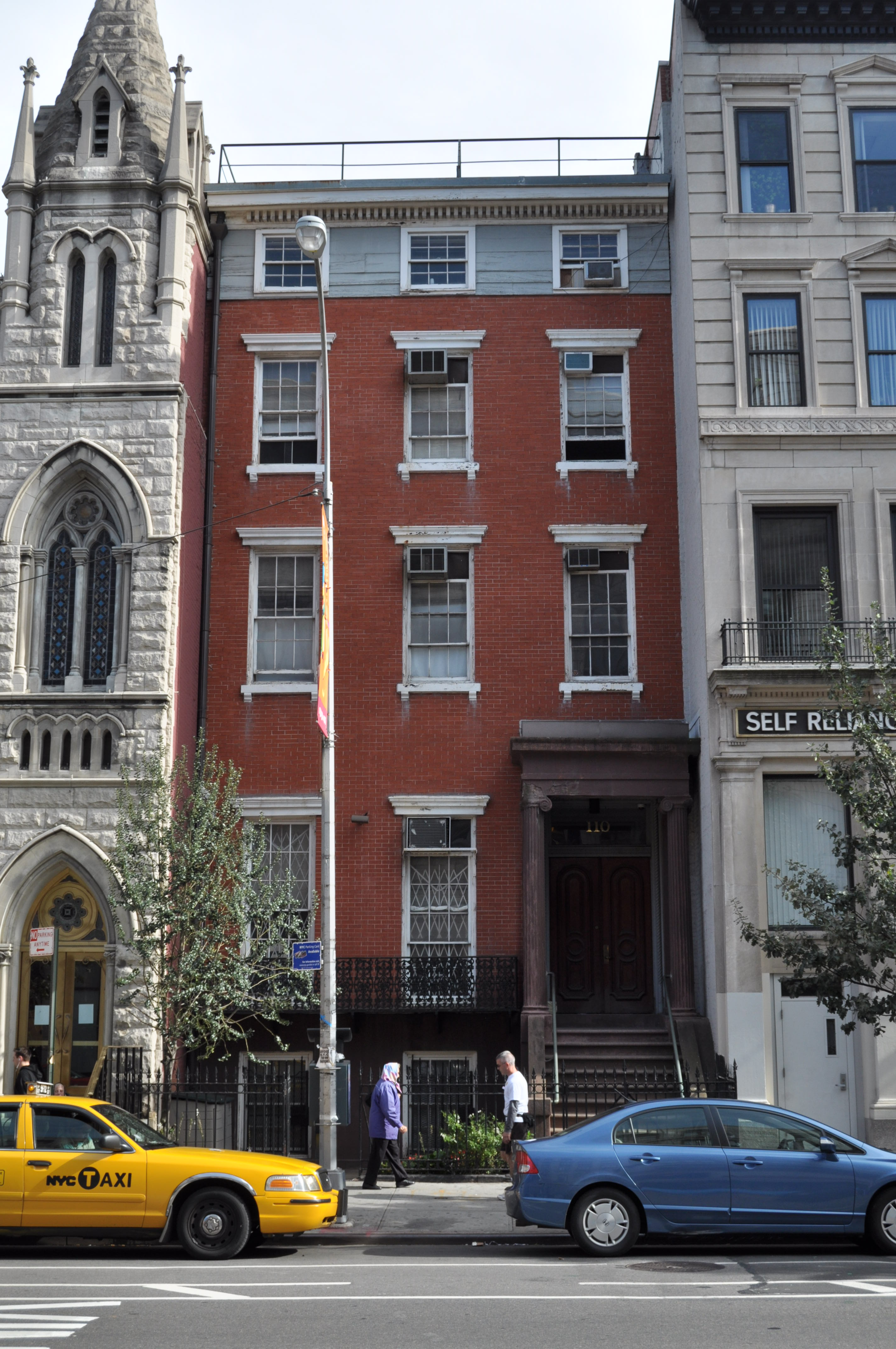
The Isaac T. Hopper Home of the Women's Prison Association in the East Village of Manhattan, New York City

In 1845, he gave up his offices with the Anti-Slavery Society, and devoted the rest of his life to the Prison Association of New York, which sought reform in prisons and the justice system. His married daughter, Abigail Hopper Gibbons, by then also in New York, founded the Women's Prison Association, to work for prison reform. She also founded an asylum for women prisoners who had been released, to help with their re-entry to society, which she named for her father as the "Isaac T. Hopper Home".

Hopper frequently visited the New York state capital of Albany to represent the association and to address the legislature. Judge Edmonds says of one of these occasions, "His eloquence was simple and direct, but most effective. If he was humorous, his audience were full of laughter; if solemn, a death-like stillness reigned; if pathetic, tears flowed all around him." He often pleaded for the pardon of prisoners. Governor John Young of New York, once said to him: "Friend Hopper, I will pardon any convict whom you say you conscientiously believe I ought to pardon." Isaac describes one such trip in a letter to his daughter Susan. He and Judge Edmonds had gone to Albany to seek an Act of Incorporation in 1846. The members of the committee encouraged him to 'go on, go on' as he told anecdotes and spoke at length about the need for prison reform. [Elsie Powell Ingraham family papers, 1810-1962.NYPL]

Hopper died in New York City on May 7, 1852.
