= Women's Prison Association =

US nonprofit organization

The Women's Prison Association (WPA), founded 1845, is the oldest advocacy group for women impacted by the criminal legal system in the United States. The organization has historically focused on New York City and New York State issues.

Most of WPA's clients in its early years were poor Irish immigrants with alcohol dependency. While the ethnicity of the clients of the association has shifted over time, the organization throughout its history has dealt with the effects of poverty, family separation, and substance abuse.

== History ==
WPA has its origins in the Prison Association of New York (now the Correctional Association), founded by Isaac T. Hopper, who had also been active as an abolitionist Quaker. A task force was set up to investigate the conditions facing incarcerated women New York, and it was established in January 1845 as the Female Department of the Prison Association. Prominent members included Hopper's daughter Abigail Hopper Gibbons and novelist Catharine Sedgwick.

From the outset, the Female Department criticized New York City–area prisons as inadequate, urging that "a home needs to be provided for the homeless; other doors need to be open to them than those that lead to deeper infamy." By the summer of 1845, the Female Department founded Hopper Home, what would today be called a halfway house, focused on training and rehabilitation of former prisoners or homeless. The Home was originally on Fourth Street near Eighth Avenue in Manhattan; it later moved to 191 Tenth Avenue. In 1874, it was moved to 110 Second Avenue. Hopper Home was sold in 2024 due to physical damage from a fire that originated in a neighboring property, which forced the closure of the facility.

In 1853, the Female Department separated from the Prison Association and was chartered by New York State as the Women's Prison Association, with Abigail Gibbons as its leader. The association gained influence. Some of its battles—such as against overcrowded jails—have been perpetual, but WPA lobbying has achieved policy and program changes. For instance, female matrons were hired in all state penal facilities holding women prisoners, a separate reformatory for women and girls was established in Bedford, New York with the guidance of WPA, and the policy was adopted that women prisoners would be searched only by female matrons.

In the 1930s, in the face of the economic exigencies of the Great Depression, the Women's Prison Association was the first women's group to call for the decriminalization of prostitution.

After more than a century of operation, WPA received its first governmental funding in the 1960s; the funding came from the federal government. In the 1980s, Hopper Home was contracted as a federal work release facility, but that contract ended in 1990.

In 2012, the organization launched JusticeHome, the nation's first home-based alternatives to incarceration program.

In 2024, Meg Egan joined WPA as the new chief executive officer. Egan previously worked on criminal legal system reform, with most of that work centering on decarceration and improving the conditions of jails.

== Current services ==
In the face of the rapid increase in the 1990s of the number of incarcerated women, WPA began to develop as a larger-scale provider of more diverse services. Hopper Home was renovated in 1992 as a residential alternative to incarceration (ATI) program, mainly for women with drug charges. In 1993, the WPA opened the Sarah Powell Huntington House (SPHH), a transitional residence that allows homeless women who have become involved with the criminal justice system to reunite with their children.

In this same period, WPA established a variety of programs for HIV-positive women involved in the New York criminal justice system. 25% of criminal justice-involved women in New York are HIV-positive. WPA programs include education and discharge planning in the city jail and state prisons, as well as case management services that can providing continuity after release. WPA coordinates inmate-peer HIV/AIDS education and support programs at Bedford Hills Correctional Facility for Women and Taconic Correctional Facility.

Based on its successes in this area, WPA began to extend discharge planning and transitional services to women who are not HIV-positive. Their first such program was established at Rikers Island in 2000.

WPA currently provides reentry and rehabilitation support, alternatives to incarceration, employment training, legal support, emergency assistance, clinical counseling, and supportive housing.In 2025, WPA opened The Rise, a supportive housing facility in Brownsville, Brooklyn, providing justice-impacted women and their families with on-site wraparound case management and reentry services. The facility uses Using Active Design principles to create a trauma-informed architectural design and is Passive House-certified.

== Other projects ==
Other current WPA projects include the Incarcerated Mother's Law Project (IMLP), founded in 1994 and co-sponsored with the Volunteers of Legal Services (VOLS). South Brooklyn Legal Services and the Center for Family Representation have joined this project. The program provides workshops for incarcerated mothers to aid them in dealing with visitation and family court issues. IMLP began at New York state prisons, but has expanded to women in the New York City jail and to women in WPA's community-based services.

Given the small number of New York City neighborhoods that are the origin of a large percentage of New York's prison population, since the late 1990s WPA has concentrated on one of these neighborhoods, the East New York area of Brooklyn. WPA established its Brooklyn Community Office (BCO) in 1999, to address the web of poverty, poor housing, health problems, and child abuse and neglect. The hope is that intensive case management can break the cycle of substance abuse and child abuse and/or neglect, and keep families intact. The program, which partners with several other organizations, expanded in 2005 to work also in the adjacent neighborhoods of Bushwick and Brownsville.

In addition to its locally focused work, in 2004 WPA founded the Institute on Women & Criminal Justice "to create a national conversation on women and criminal justice in relation to families and communities."

== See also ==
- Incarceration of women in the United States
