= Henry R. Robinson =

American lithographer and publisher

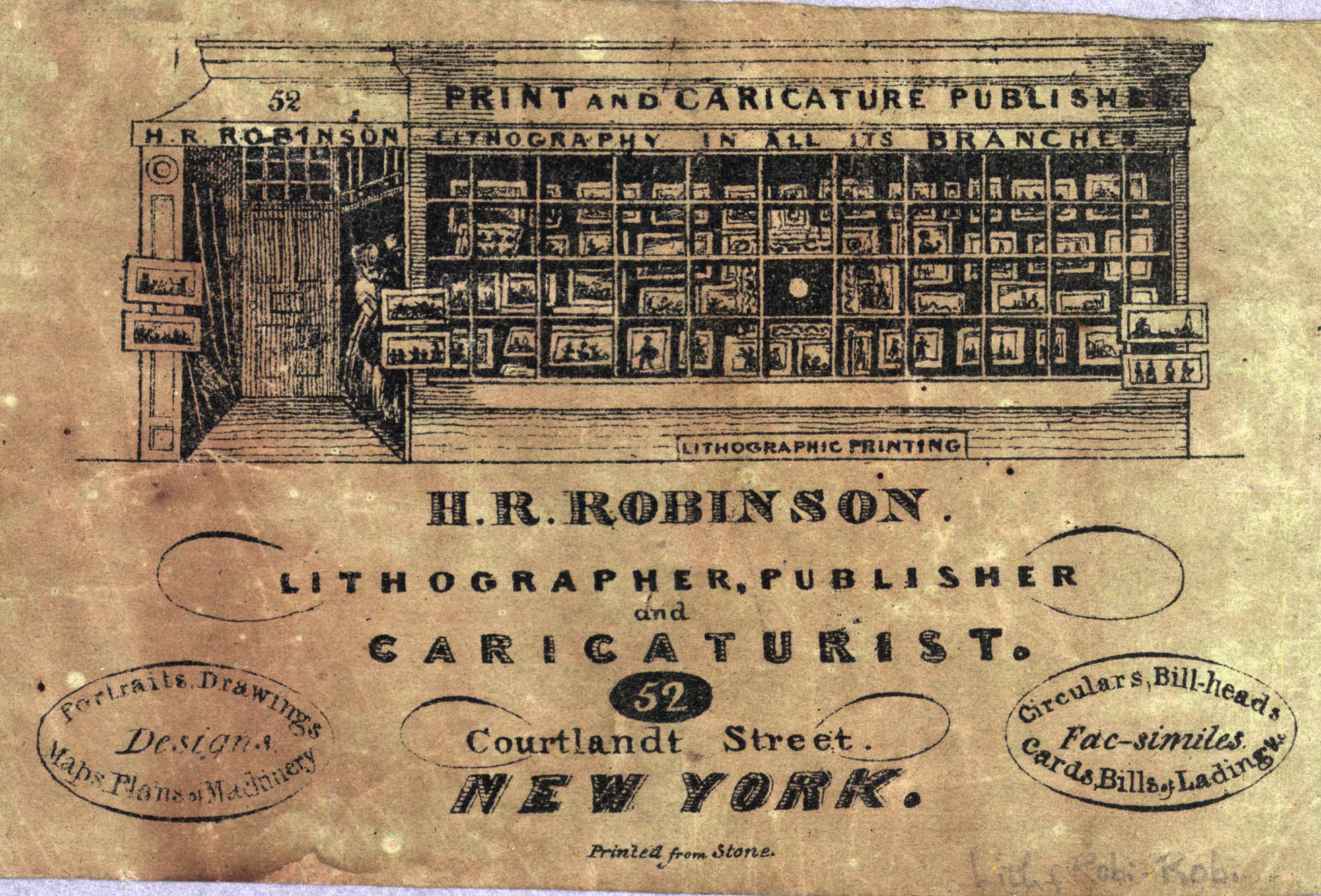
H. R. Robinson's business card (1840)

Henry R. Robinson, also known as H. R. Robinson was an American lithographer and publisher active in New York City between 1831 and 1850.

== Career ==
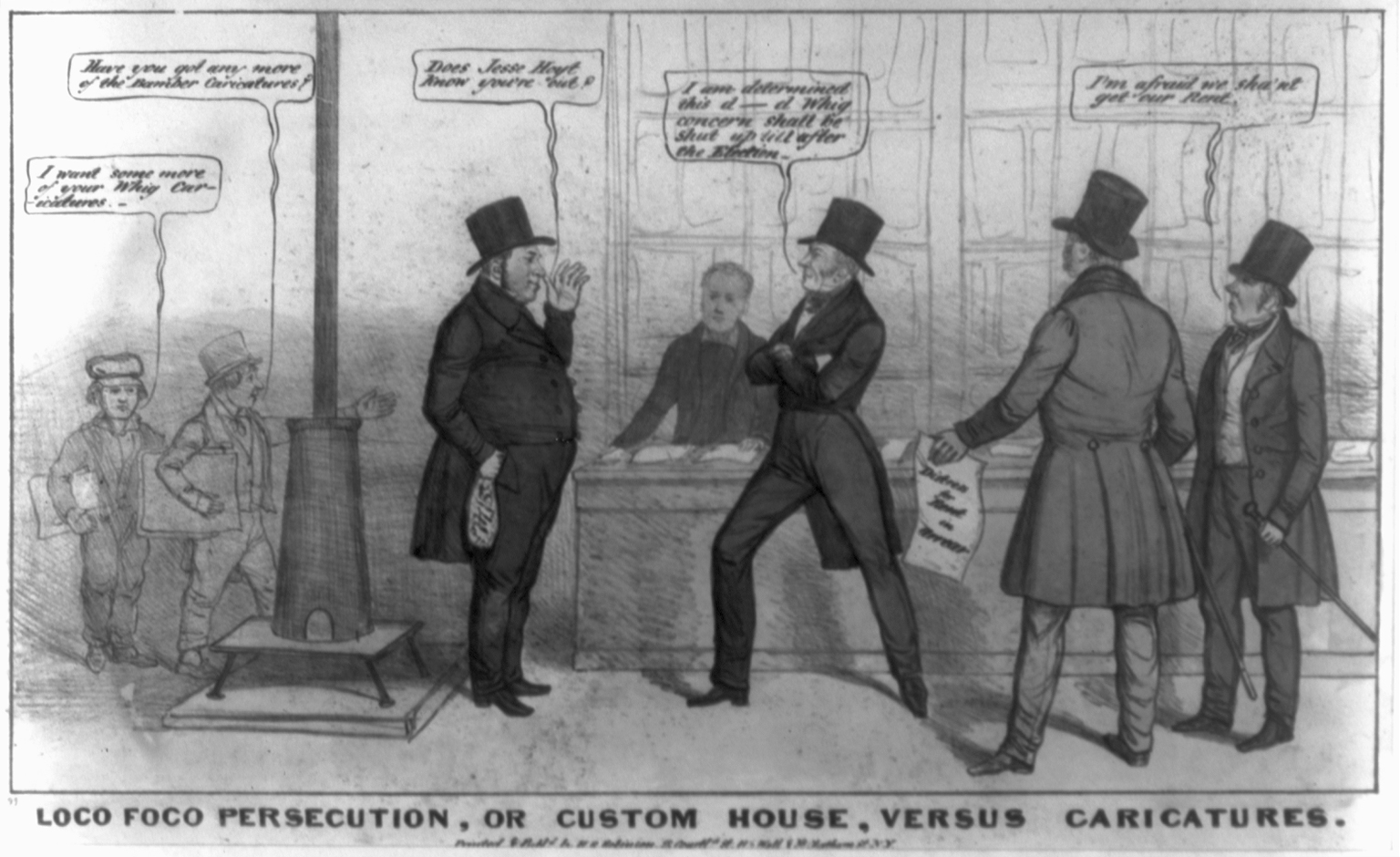
Lithograph cartoon Loco Foco Persecution published by H. R. Robinson (1838). The shop propieter may be Robinson, and the boys on the left are selling caricatures.

Robinson was a major publisher of works on the political issues in the United States, particularly caricatures. He was active during the administration of Andrew Jackson, Martin Van Buren, Benjamin Harrison, John Tyler, James K. Polk and Zachary Taylor. But he was most productive between 1836 and 1840. His works included political cartoons commenting on current events, and his specialty is caricature. He also had an office in Washington D. C. to keep in contact with issues at the federal level.

He worked with various artists, such as Edward Williams Clay establishing and developing a support system for political cartooning in New York City, during a period that represented the fastest-growing location for graphic arts industry in the country. Their collaboration made the New York City the center of political cartooning in the United States.

Robinson ran his business by making prints in his store, which was located at 52 Courtland Street in New York City.

In New York City during the 1840s, lithograph shops like Robinson's were plentiful. The shops typically had a few printer's assistants and some boys that distributed the prints. Publishers like Robinson had to diversify their printing to stay in business, printing portraiture, creating images inspired by daguerreotypes, illustrating music and books, labels, and billheads.

To distribute caricatures, Robinson would sell them to agents and customers via retail. They were sold in caricature shops, studios, and bookshops. He would also sell his broadsides on the street, like newspapers. This, combined with the lithographic material, allowed him to create timely images for fast-breaking and short-term political topics in a way far superior to woodblock prints. In the United States, fifty single-sheet caricatures were published in 1836, higher than any previous year. Robinson produced thirty-seven of them, and thirteen were done with Clay.

Clay and Robinson established the tradition of American political satire through cartoon. The cartoons were usually presented as pictorial metaphors with the cartoon's impact being determined by the portrayal of the figures. Robinson's work was sympathetic to the Whig Party, and he was open about his biases. But he worked independently of the party networks. Clay's political opinions were more independent. When Robinson and Clay disagreed on how they would address issues, Clay would work on other projects and Robinson would hire another artist.
